= STX Europe =

Norwegian shipyard operator

- Type: Private
- Industry: Shipbuilding
- Predecessor: Aker Yards
- Founded: 2004 (as Aker Yards); 2008 (as STX Europe)
- Headquarters: Oslo, Norway
- Key people: In-Sung Lee (chairman of the board); Su-jou Kim (president & CEO)
- Revenue: NOK 31,496 million (2008)
- Operating income: ▼ (NOK 561million) (2008)
- Net income: ▲NOK 40 million (2008)
- Owner: STX Offshore & Shipbuilding
- Number of employees: 15,500(2008)

STX Europe AS, formerly Aker Yards ASA, was until 2012 a subsidiary of the South Korean STX Offshore & Shipbuilding.

With headquarters in Oslo, Norway, STX Europe operated 15 shipyards in Brazil, Finland, France, Norway, Romania and Vietnam. The company had three business areas: Cruise & Ferries, Offshore & Specialized Vessels and Other Operations.

In 2012, with rising outstanding debts, STX retained the Finnish cruise shipbuilding yard and sold the remainder as STX OSV Holdings, (Offshore & Specialist Vessels), including all the yards, to Fincantieri, which renamed the group Vard.

In September 2014 STX Finland was sold, 70% to Meyer Werft and 30% to the Finnish government. The operations were continued under name Meyer Turku thereafter. Meyer Werft acquired the Finnish government's 30% in April 2015.

In 2017 STX France was acquired by the French government after the bankruptcy of STX Corporation and reverted to its original name of Chantiers de l'Atlantique.

== History ==
=== Background: before 2006 ===
The evolution of STX Europe originated with the founding of two prominent shipbuilding groups in Europe. One was the Norway-based Aker Yards, created in 2004 by combining the shipbuilding activities of Aker and Kværner with the France-based Alstom shipbuilding group, which has shipyards (formerly those of Chantiers de l'Atlantique) in Saint-Nazaire and in Lorient.

=== Transition to STX Europe, and expansion: 2006–2012 ===
On 4 January 2006, Aker Yards and Alstom announced their intention to join forces in shipbuilding and create together one of the world leaders in this industry, focused on high-value-added ships, including world-class cruise ships. The merger gave Aker Yards a majority shareholding over Alstom's shipbuilding activities; which included Chantiers de l'Atlantique shipyard – the builder of the liner RMS Queen Mary 2.

Aker ASA, the majority shareholder of Aker Yards, reduced its ownership share from 50.4% to 40.1% in January 2007. Aker divested its total shareholding in March 2007, and in October 2007, STX Business Group secured a 39.2% stake of Aker yards. Later, STX took a controlling stake, and renamed the group to STX Europe on 3 November 2008 to reflect the new ownership structure.

In January 2009, STX Business Group acquired the remaining shares in STX Europe and became the company's sole shareholder. In February 2009, it was decided to delist STX Europe from Oslo Stock Exchange where it was previously listed under the ticker STXEUR.

== Operations ==
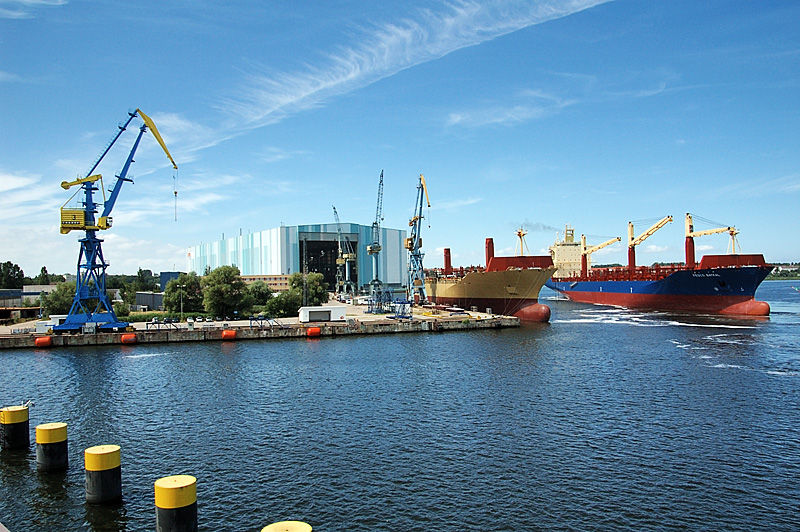
Photo from Wadan Yards in Wismar, Germany, previously partly owned by STX Europe

=== Cruise & Ferries ===
The Cruise & Ferries division constructs vessels mainly at shipyards in Finland and France. The business area had revenues of NOK 19,709 million in 2008.

=== List of shipyards ===
==== Cruise + Ferry ====
- STX France Cruise SA (located at St. Nazaire and Lorient)

==== Other Operations ====
- STX Norway Florø AS (located in Florø)

==== OSV (OffShore & Specialized Vessels) ====
- STX Norway Offshore AS (located at Ålesund, Aukra, Brevik, Langsten (Langsten Slip-Batbyggeri AS), Brattvåg, and Søviknes) is now owned by Fincantieri
- (Romania) STX OSV Tulcea SA and STX OSV Braila SA - both yards are now part of Vard Shipyard Romana, a Fincantieri Company.

STX Europe has two shipyards in Romania: Braila and Tulcea. The steel hulls for most of STX Europe's new building projects (Offshore & Specialized Vessels) are being built by Braila and Tulcea in Romania. STX Europe's yard in Braila is situated 170 km up the River Danube. Portfolios consist of hull production, delivery of complete merchant vessels together with repair and conversion work. The yard has a 1300m long outfitting quay, facilities for simultaneous mounting or repairing of 12 vessels and equipped with multiple 50 tonne portal cranes. The mounting platform and launching berth have capacity for vessels up to 135 x 23 m and a maximum launching and lifting weight of 2500 tonne and 2200 tonne respectively.

STX Europe's yard in Tulcea is located at nautical mile 39.5 on the right bank of the Danube, upstream of Tulcea, and it is one of the youngest Romanian firms in the field. In Tulcea STX Europe offers services in shipbuilding, conversions and repairs. It has a large covered hall where four ships can be built simultaneously. Over 6000 people working here, it is the greater capacity of offshore and specialised division.

- (Brazil) STX OSV Niteroi SA
- STX OSV Vietnam Ltd.

== Production ==
=== Ships ===
STX Europe :

- Adventure of the Seas, in 2001 for Royal Caribbean International
- Allure of the Seas, in 2010 for Royal Caribbean International
- Carnival Legend, in 2002 for Carnival Cruise Lines
- Carnival Miracle, in 2004 for Carnival Cruise Lines
- Carnival Pride, in 2001 for Carnival Cruise Lines
- Carnival Spirit, in 2001 for Carnival Cruise Lines
- Coral Princess, in 2001 for Princess Cruises
- Costa Atlantica, in 2000 for Costa Cruises
- Costa Mediterranea, in 2003 for Costa Cruises
- Explorer of the Seas, in 2000 for Royal Caribbean International
- Freedom of the Seas, in 2006 for Royal Caribbean International
- Independence of the Seas, in 2008 for Royal Caribbean International
- Island Princess, in 2003 for Princess Cruises
- Liberty of the Seas, in 2007 for Royal Caribbean International
- Majesty of the Seas, in 1992 for Royal Caribbean International
- Mariner of the Seas, in 2003 for Royal Caribbean International
- Monarch of the Seas, in 1991 for Royal Caribbean International
- MSC Divina, in 2012 for MSC Cruises
- MSC Fantasia, in 2008 for MSC Cruises
- MSC Lirica, in 2003 for MSC Cruises
- MSC Magnifica, in 2010 for MSC Cruises
- MSC Musica, in 2006 for MSC Cruises
- MSC Opera, 2004 for MSC Cruises
- MSC Orchestra, in 2007 for MSC Cruises
- MSC Poesia, in 2008 for MSC Cruises
- MSC Preziosa, in 2013 for MSC Cruises
- MSC Splendida, in 2009 for MSC Cruises
- Navigator of the Seas, in 2002 for Royal Caribbean International
- Oasis of the Seas, in 2009 for Royal Caribbean International
- Queen Mary 2, in 2003 for Cunard
- R One, in 1998 for Renaissance Cruises (since 2004 Insignia (Oceania Cruises))
- R Two, in 1998 for Renaissance Cruises (since 2003 Regatta (Oceania Cruises))
- R Three, in 1999 for Renaissance Cruises (since 2002 Pacific Princess (Princess Cruises))
- R Four, in 1999 for Renaissance Cruises (since 2002 Ocean Princess (Princess Cruises))
- R Five, in 1998 for Renaissance Cruises (since 2005 Nautica (Oceania Cruises))
- R Six, in 2000 for Renaissance Cruises (since 2007 Azamara Journey (Azamara Club Cruises))
- R Seven, in 2000 for Renaissance Cruises (since 2007 Azamara Quest (Azamara Club Cruises))
- R Eight, in 2001 for Renaissance Cruises (since 2007 Royal Princess (Princess Cruises))
- Rhapsody of the Seas, in 1999 for Royal Caribbean International
- Vision of the Seas, in 1998 for Royal Caribbean International
- Voyager of the Seas, in 1999 for Royal Caribbean International
- Armorique, in 2009 for Brittany Ferries
- Aurora af Helsingborg, in 1992 for Scandlines
- Baltic Princess, in 2006 for Tallink
- Birka Paradise, in 2004 for Birka Line
- Color Fantasy, in 2004 for Color Line
- Color Magic, in 2007 for Color Line
- Celebrity Constellation, in 2002 for Celebrity Cruises
- Aeolos Express, (HSC) in 2000 for NEL Lines (since 2007 Aeolos Kenteris I)
- Aeolos Express II, (HSC) in 2001 for NEL Lines (since 2007 Aeolos Kenteris II)
- Aeolos Kenteris, (HSC) in 2001 for NEL Lines
- Cotentin, in 2007 for Brittany Ferries
- Crystal Serenity, in 2003 for Crystal Cruises
- Destination Gotland, in 1999 for Destination Gotland
- Dreamward, in 1992 for Norwegian Cruise Line
- Dryna, in 2005 for Fjord1
- European Stars, in 2002 for Festival Cruises (since 2005 MSC Sinfonia (MSC Cruises))
- European Vision, in 2001 for Festival Cruises (since 2004 MSC Armonia (MSC Cruises))
- Galaxy, in 2006 for Tallink
- Glutra, in 2000 for MRF
- Hamlet, in 1997 for Scandlines
- Hamnavoe, in 2002 for NorthLink Ferries
- Haroy, in 2006
- Hjaltland, in 2001 for NorthLink
- Hrossey, in 2001 for NorthLink
- Île de Groix, in 2008 for the Morbihan département
- Impératrice Eugénie, in 1865
- Celebrity Infinity, in 2001 for Celebrity Cruises
- Julsund, in 2004 for Fjord1
- Kalliste, in 1993 for Compagnie méridionale de navigation
- Le Levant, in 1999 for Compagnie du Ponant
- Celebrity Millennium, in 2000 for Celebrity Cruises
- Mistral, in 1999 for Festival Cruises (since 2005 Grand Mistral (Iberocruceros))
- Napoléon Bonaparte, in 1996 for SNCM
- Nils Dacke, in 1994 for TT-Lines
- Nordic Empress, in 1990 for Royal Caribbean International
- Paul Gauguin, in 1997 for Radisson Seven Seas Cruises
- Polonia, in 1995 for Unity Lines
- Radisson Diamond (SWATH) in 1992 for Radisson Seven Seas Cruises (since 2005 Asia Star)
- Romantika, in 2002, for Tallink
- SeaFrance Rodin, in 2001 for SeaFrance
- SeaFrance Berlioz, in 2005 for SeaFrance
- Spirit of Britain, in 2010 for P&O Ferries
- Spirit of France, in 2011 for P&O Ferries
- Star, in 2007 for Tallink
- Stena Explorer, (HSC) in 1996 for Stena Line
- Celebrity Summit, in 2001 for Celebrity Cruises
- SuperSpeed 1, in 2008 for Color Line
- SuperSpeed 2, in 2008 for Color Line
- Tidedronningen, in 2009 for Tide Sjo AS
- Tidekongen, in 2009 for Tide Sjo AS
- Tideprinsen, in 2009 for Tide Sjo AS
- Tycho Brahe, in 1991 for DSB Rederi
- Ulysses, in 2001 for Irish Ferries
- Victoria 1, in 2004 for Tallink
- Viking Grace , in 2013 for Viking Line
- Viking Surkov, in 1984 (since 2008 Viking Helgi for Viking River Cruises)
- Viking XPRS, in 2008 for Viking Line
- Windward, in 1993 for Norwegian Cruise Line
- ADV Ocean Shield, as OSV Skandi Bergen
