= Festival Cruises =

Greece-based cruise line that operated between 1994 and 2004

- Industry: Ship transport
- Founded: 1992
- Defunct: 2004
- Fate: Bankruptcy
- Headquarters: Greece
- Key people: George Poulides
- Products: Cruises

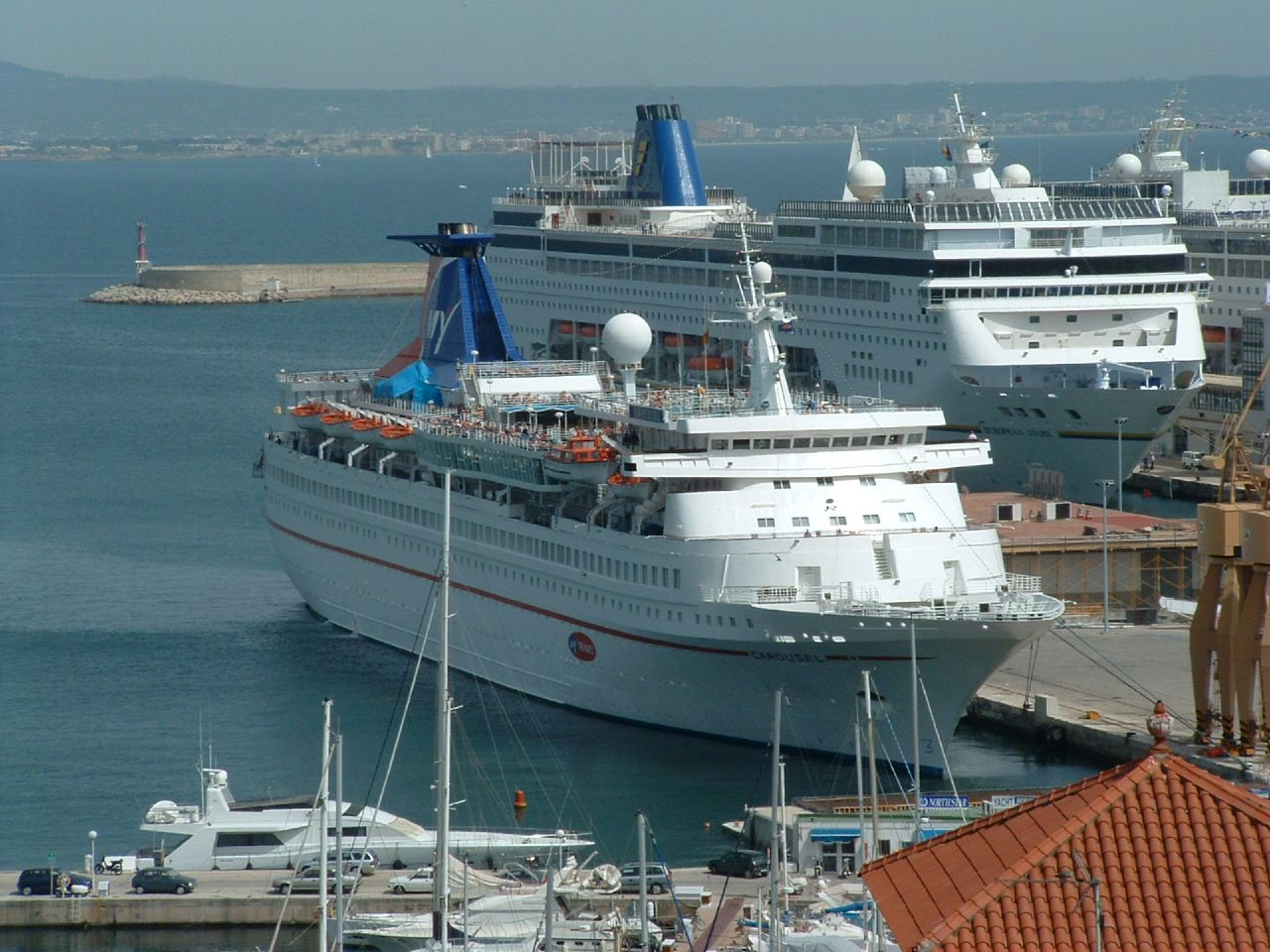
European Stars in the Port of Palma in May 2003

Festival Cruises (known as First European Cruises in North America) was a Greece-based cruise line that operated between 1994 and 2004. It was founded in 1992 by the Greek entrepreneur George Poulides using second-hand ships. The company acquired three new-built ships between 1999 and 2002, but was forced to declare bankruptcy in 2004.

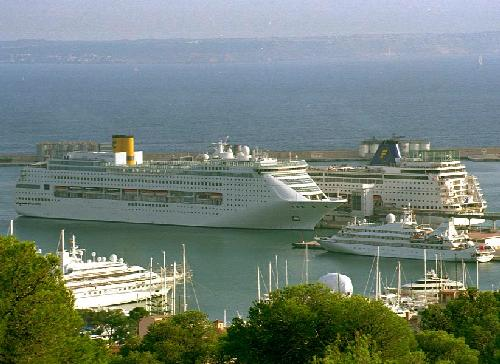
The Costa Victoria and European Vision, in the Port of Palma in 2001

== History ==
George Poulides founded Festival Cruises in 1992. The company begun operations in 1994 after purchasing Azur from Chandris Cruises. The following year the company acquired Starward from Norwegian Cruise Line, renaming her Bolero. A third second-hand ship followed in 1997, when Southern Cross was acquired from CTC Lines and renamed Flamenco for service with Festival.

Festival Cruises acquired their first newbuilt ship in 1999, when Mistral was delivered from Chantiers de l'Atlantique in France. In 2000 Festival Cruises announced that the company would be merged into P&O, with the Festival Cruises brand being maintained under P&O ownership. The merger plan was abandoned later that year due to low value of cruise line shares at the time. Two additional newbuilt ships based on an enlarged version of the Mistral design were delivered in 2001 and 2002 as European Vision and European Stars, respectively. Following delivery of the new ships the Bolero and Flamenco were chartered to other operators. Festival Cruises had an option for two more ships of the enlarged Mistral design, but the company decided not to use the option. Two more Mistral class ships were however built for MSC Cruises as MSC Lirica and MSC Opera.

Festival Cruises went bankrupt in early 2004, with all the company's ships were laid up and subsequently auctioned to other operators; European Stars and European Vision were sold to MSC Cruises, Mistral to a French investor group who chartered her to Iberojet, The Azur to Mano Maritime, Bolero to Abou Merhi Lines and Flamenco to Cruise Elysia.

== Ships ==
Ship	Built	In service for Festival Cruises	Tonnage	Notes	Image
Azur	1971	1994–2004	11,609 GRT	Since 2017 Knyaz Vladimir for Black Sea Cruises	
Bolero	1968	1995–2001	12,948 GRT	Sold for scrap in 2018	
Caribe	1948	2002–2004	15,614 GRT	Built for Swedish America Line as Stockholm. 2015-2021 Astoria for Cruise & Maritime Voyages, arrived at Ghent for scrapping in 2025.	
Flamenco	1972	1997–2003	17,370 GRT	Originally ordered for Norwegian Cruise Line as Seaward. Capsized and partially sank on 27 February 2016 near Laem Chebang, Thailand	
Mistral	1999	1999–2004	47,276 GT	From 2019 AIDAmira until 2022 for AIDA Cruises, Since 2022 at Ambassador Cruise Line as Ambition	
European Vision	2001	2001–2004	58,174 GT	Since 2004 Armonia for MSC Cruises	
European Stars	2002	2002–2004	58,625 GT	Since 2004 Sinfonia for MSC Cruises	
