= Mistral-class cruise ship =

Class of cruise ship

Mistral
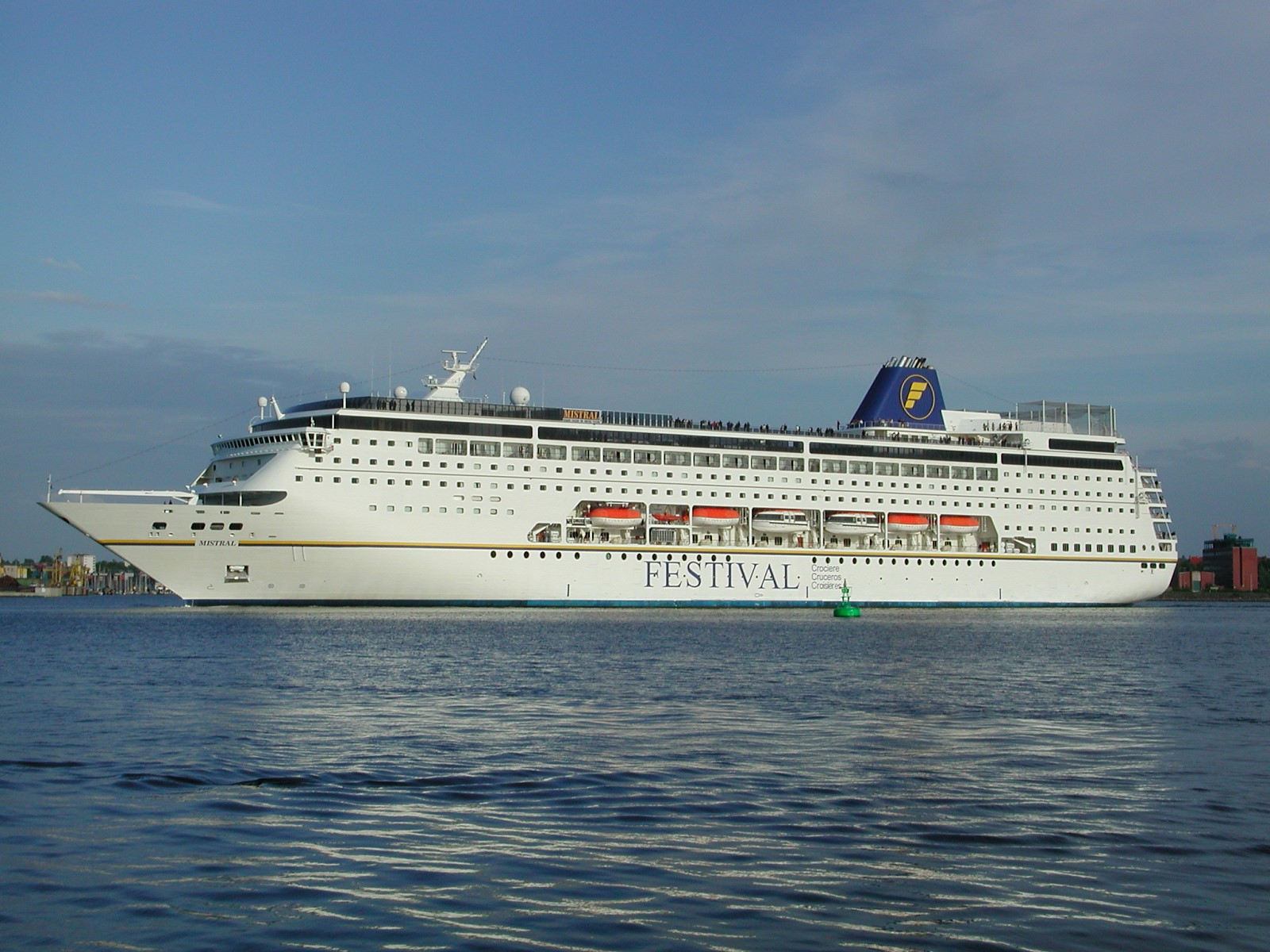
- MS Mistral at Kiel, Germany, in 2003

Class overview
- Builders: Chantiers de l'Atlantique, St. Nazaire, France
- Operators: Festival Cruises (1999–2004); MSC Cruises (2003–present); Ibero Cruises (2004–2013); Costa Cruises (2013–2019); AIDA Cruises (2019–2022); Ambassador Cruise Line (2022–present)
- Preceded by: Renaissance Cruises: R class
- Succeeded by: MSC Cruises: Musica class
- Subclasses: Lirica class
- Built: 1999–2004
- In service: 2000–present
- Completed: 5
- Active: 4
- Laid up: 1 pending refit

General characteristics
- Type: Cruise ship
- Tonnage: 48,200 GT (AIDAmira), 58,625 GT (MSC Armonia, MSC Sinfonia), 59,058 GT (MSC Lirica, MSC Opera); 6,980 DWT
- Length: 216 m (708 ft 8 in); 275.25 m (903 ft 1 in)
- Beam: 28.80 m (94 ft 6 in)
- Draught: 6.8 m (22 ft 4 in)
- Depth: 6.6 m (21 ft 8 in)
- Decks: 9 (passenger accessible)
- Installed power: 4 × Wärtsilä 12V38; 31680 kW (combined)
- Propulsion: 2 × Azimuth thrusters (20,000 kW)
- Speed: 21 knots (39 km/h; 24 mph)
- Capacity: 1,500 to 2,000 passengers
- Crew: 700, 740 (MSC Opera)

The Mistral class is a class of cruise ships, now owned and operated by MSC Cruises and Ambassador Cruise Line. There are currently five active Mistral-class cruise ships, the lead vessel, Ambition (1999 as Mistral), MSC Armonia (2001 as European Vision), MSC Sinfonia (2002 as European Stars), MSC Lirica (2002) and MSC Opera (2003).

== History ==
The lead vessel Mistral was originally ordered by Renaissance Cruises in the summer of 1996, but the order was later withdrawn. The yard and bankers together held ownership of the ship through a company called Auxiliaire Maritime. During construction at Chantiers de l'Atlantique, the order was taken over by Festival Cruises, which would be receiving its first new-build vessel. Two additional newbuilt ships based on an enlarged version of the Mistral design were delivered in 2001 and 2002 as MS European Vision and MS European Stars, respectively. Festival Cruises had an option for two more ships of the enlarged Mistral design, but the company decided not to use the option. Two more Mistral class ships were however built for MSC Cruises as MSC Lirica and MSC Opera.

When Festival Cruises went bankrupt in early 2004, all the company's ships were laid up and subsequently auctioned to other operators; European Stars and European Vision were sold to MSC Cruises and renamed MSC Armonia and MSC Sinfonia respectively, while Mistral was sold to Ibero Cruises and renamed Grand Mistral. In 2013, Grand Mistral exited the Ibero Cruises fleet and was transferred to sister brand Costa Cruises as the Costa neoRiviera. Costa reportedly invested €10 million into transforming the ship to integrate it into its fleet. In 2014, MSC Cruises announced that the four Lirica-class ships would undergo renovation under the "Renaissance Programme". Each of the vessels was lengthened by 24 metres (79 ft) in 2015, adding 193 extra cabins.

Costa neoRiviera exited Costa's fleet in 2019 and was transferred to sister brand AIDA Cruises as AIDAmira. She was sold in 2022 to Ambassador Cruise Line, which intends operating her as Ambition from 2023.

=== Incidents ===
On 2 June 2019, MSC Opera allided with the quay and struck a river cruise ship moored at the San Basilio Pier in the Giudecca Canal at Venice, Italy. The cause was later found to be technical difficulties with the engines while under tow. She sustained superficial scratches, while the smaller river vessel was more heavily damaged and five people were slightly injured.

On 12 March 2021, MSC Lirica was damaged by a fire amidships, which is believed to have started in a lifeboat; there were no casualties. The area affected (part of the vessel that was added in the 2015 lengthening) was later repaired.

== Ships ==
Ship	Year Built	Gross tonnage	Flag	Notes	Image
Ambassador Cruise Line
Ambition	1999	48,200	Bahamas	Formerly Mistral, Grand Mistral, and Costa neoRiviera	
MSC Cruises
MSC Armonia	2000	65,542 (Note: Originally 58,174 GT)	Panama	Formerly European Vision	
MSC Sinfonia	2001	65,542	Panama	Formerly European Stars	
MSC Lirica	2002	65,591 (Note: Originally 59,058 GT)	Panama		
MSC Opera	2003	65,591	Panama		
