= MSC Lirica =

Cruise ship

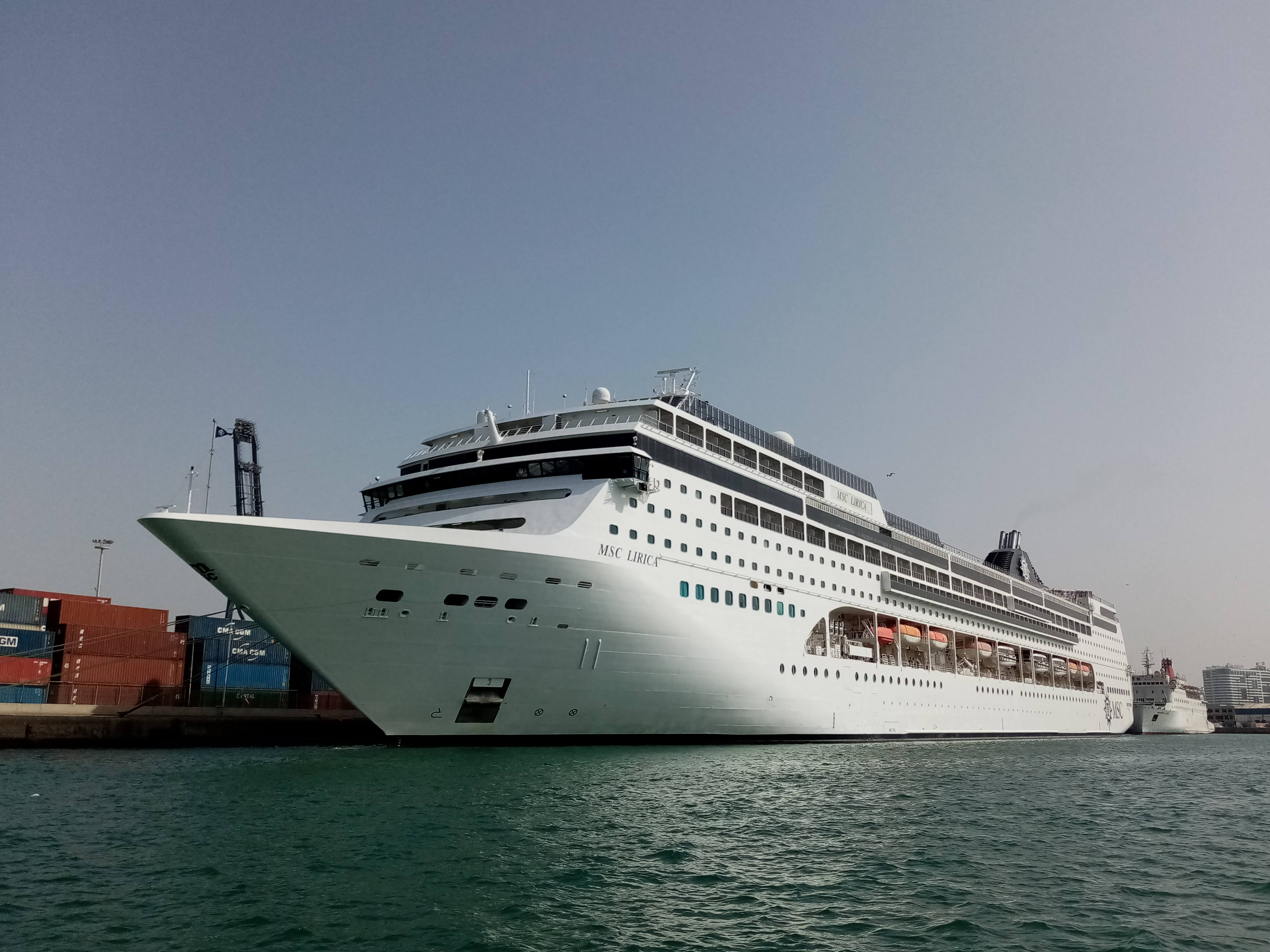

History
- Name: MSC Lirica
- Namesake: lirica, Italian word for "lyric"
- Owner: MSC Cruises
- Operator: MSC Cruises
- Port of registry: Panama
- Builder: Chantiers de l'Atlantique, St. Nazaire, France
- Cost: $250 million
- Launched: August 2002
- Christened: 1 March 2003
- Completed: 2003
- Maiden voyage: 2003
- In service: 2003
- Identification: Call sign: HOPW; IMO number: 9246102; MMSI no.: 356042000
- Status: in service
- Notes: First newbuild for MSC

General characteristics
- Class & type: Lirica-class cruise ship
- Tonnage: 59,058 GT; 65,591 GT (after renovation)
- Length: 251.25 m (824 ft 4 in); 274.9 m (901 ft 11 in) (after renovation)
- Beam: 28.8 m (94 ft 6 in); 32 m (105 ft 0 in) (after renovation)
- Draft: 6.60 m (21 ft 8 in)
- Decks: 13 (9 for passengers)
- Installed power: Four diesel generators (7,650 kW each)
- Propulsion: Two azimuth thrusters (20,000 kW)
- Speed: 21 knots (39 km/h; 24 mph)
- Capacity: 1,984 (double occupancy); 2,648 passengers (maximum after renovation)
- Crew: 700

MSC Lirica is the lead ship in her class of cruise ship, owned and operated by MSC Cruises. She was the first newbuild cruise ship to enter service for MSC Cruises. She can accommodate 1,560 passengers in 780 cabins. Her crew complement is approximately 732. MSC Opera is an identical sister ship to the MSC Lirica. Her other sisters in the class, MSC Armonia and MSC Sinfonia are essentially the same, but have a smaller funnel and other modifications, such as the bow windows and changes to the interior.

== History ==
During a cast-off maneuver in Civitavecchia, the MSC Lirica was pressed against the pier facilities on 2 November 2007 in strong winds and damaged in the bow area on the port side. The ship was repaired in dry dock between 12 and 17 November 2007 and returned to Fort Lauderdale on 4 December.

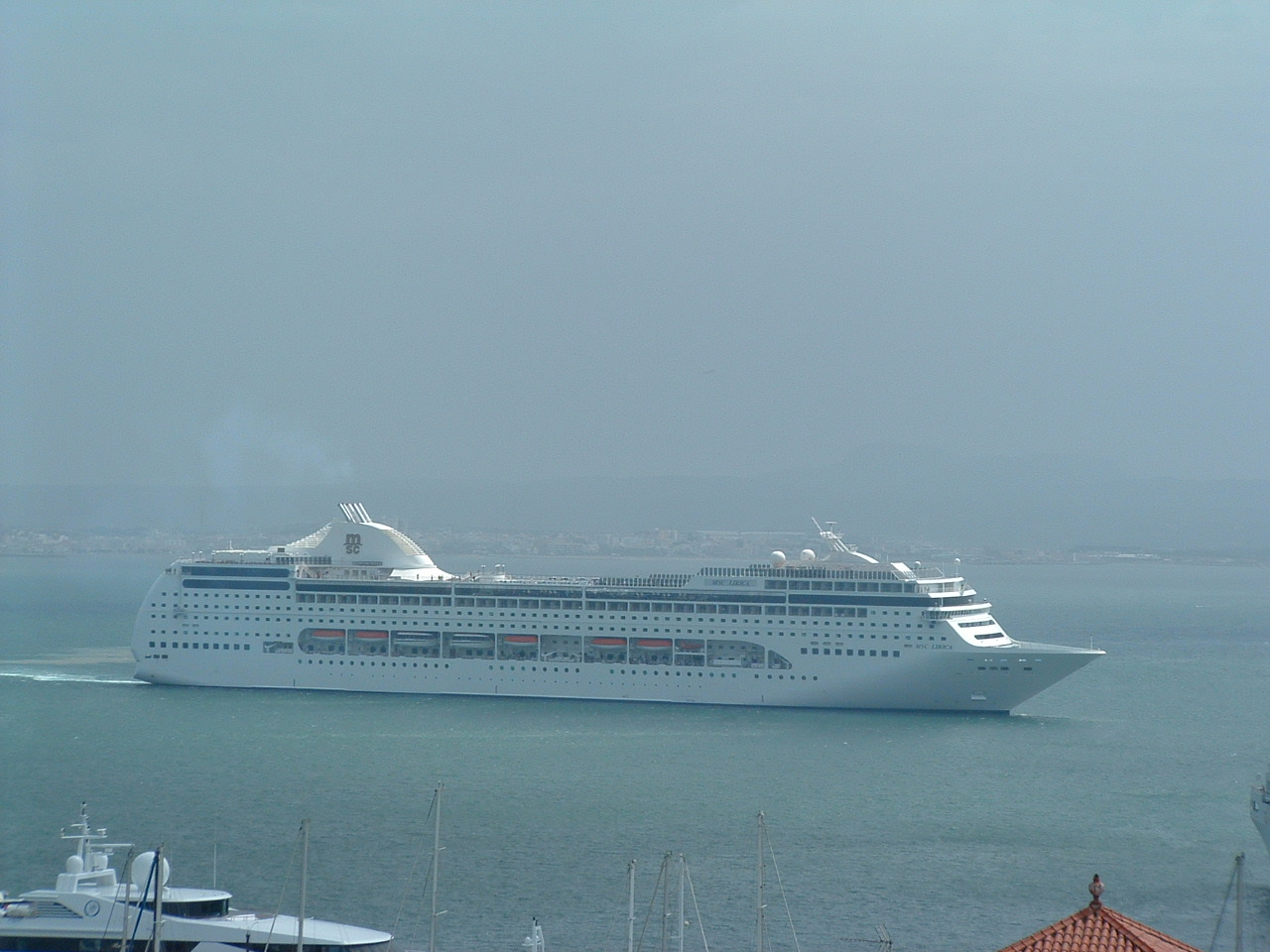
MSC Lirica in original white livery

The MSC Lirica was lengthened in November 2015.

On 12 March 2021, the ship caught on fire amidships during lay-up at the port of Corfu, Greece, with only crew on board. According to MSC Cruises, the fire started in an empty fiberglass lifeboat and caused damage to the side of the ship, but not its interior, and there were no injuries. The area of the fire corresponded to the part of the vessel that was added in her 2015 lengthening and was later repaired.

== Areas of operation ==
From March 2016 she cruised in Asia visiting ports in China, Japan and Korea. In January 2018, MSC Cruises announced that the ship would spend her 2018-2019 winter season operating cruises in the United Arab Emirates. In July 2019, the MSC Lirica served as a hotel for athletes competing in the 30th Summer Universiade in Naples.

Following the interruption due to COVID-19 and the on-board fire, MSC announced that MSC Lirica would return to service in April 2022 with a full season of 7-night Eastern Mediterranean cruises, based at Piraeus.
