= MSC Virtuosa =

Cruise ship

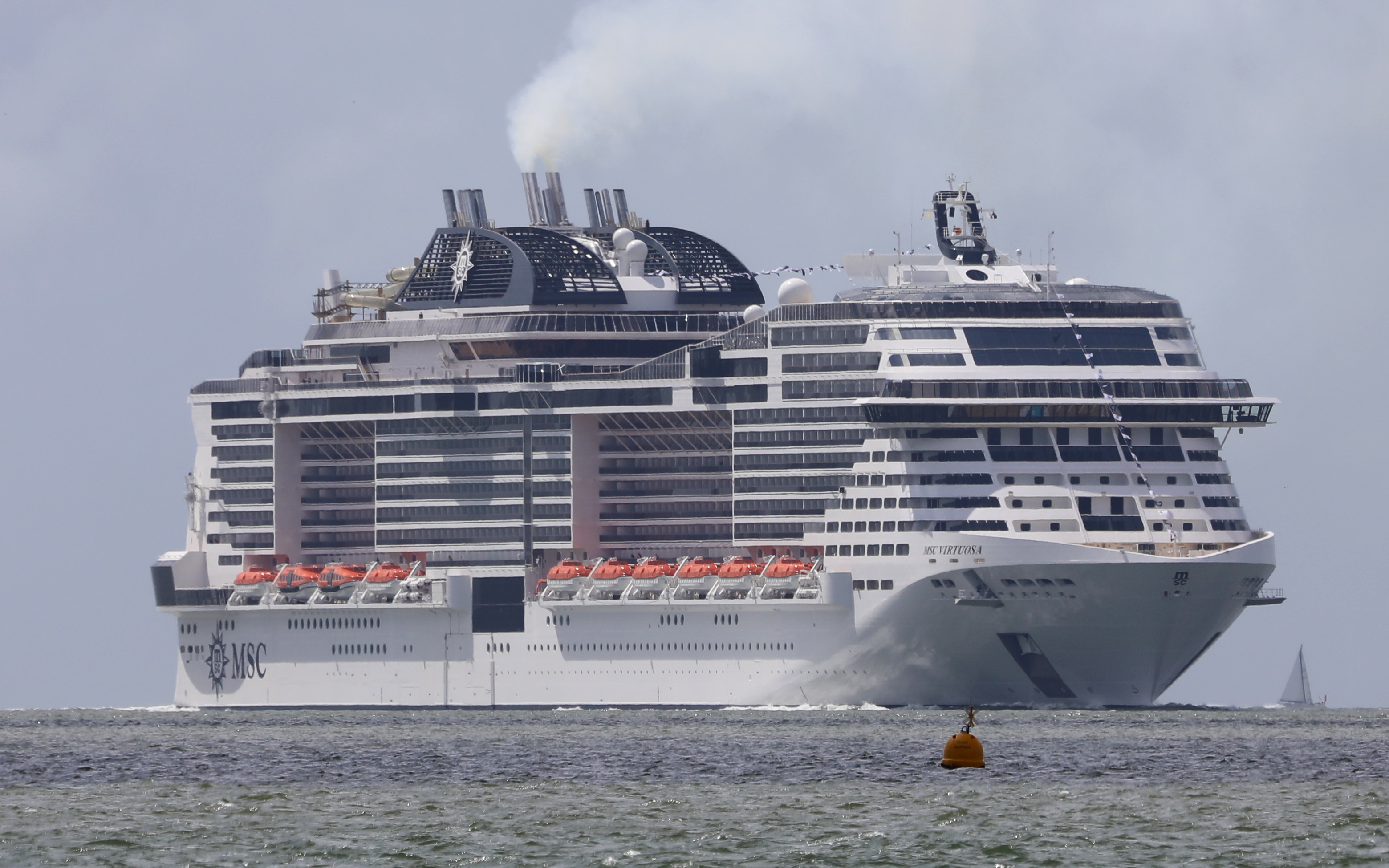
- MSC Virtuosa near Southampton, 2021

History

Malta
- Name: MSC Virtuosa
- Owner: MSC Cruises
- Operator: MSC Cruises
- Port of registry: Valletta, Malta
- Ordered: 1 February 2016
- Builder: Chantiers de l'Atlantique
- Cost: €800 million (2016) (equivalent to €965.87 million in 2025)
- Yard number: H34
- Laid down: 27 February 2019
- Launched: 29 November 2019
- Sponsored by: Sophia Loren
- Christened: 27 November 2021
- Acquired: 1 February 2021
- In service: 2021–present
- Identification: Call sign: 9HA5209; IMO number: 9803625; MMSI number: 215610000

General characteristics
- Class & type: Meraviglia Plus-class cruise ship
- Tonnage: 181,541 GT
- Length: 331.43 m (1,087.4 ft)
- Beam: 43 m (141.1 ft) (moulded); 50 m (164.0 ft) (max)
- Height: 64.9 m (213 ft)
- Decks: 16
- Speed: 22.3 kt (21,900 long tons; 24,600 short tons)
- Capacity: 4,842 (double occupancy); 6,334 (maximum capacity)
- Crew: 1,704

MSC Virtuosa is a Meraviglia-Plus-class cruise ship owned and operated by MSC Cruises. Built by Chantiers de l'Atlantique in Saint-Nazaire, France, she is the second ship in the Meraviglia-Plus class and sister ship to MSC Grandiosa. Originally scheduled to debut on 8 November 2020, her delivery and entry into service was delayed due to the COVID-19 pandemic. She was delivered to MSC Cruises on 1 February 2021 and entered service in May 2021.

== History ==
=== Construction ===
On 2 February 2016, MSC Cruises announced that they had converted their options for two new ships into firm orders, with the new vessels being a part of a sub-class that evolves from the cruise line's original Meraviglia-class platform, dubbed "Meraviglia Plus". Each new vessel was designed to be larger than their older Meraviglia-class sisters, at 181,000 GT, with a maximum passenger capacity of 6,334 guests.

On 14 June 2018, MSC Cruises celebrated the steel-cutting for the second Meraviglia Plus-class vessel and also announced her name as MSC Virtuosa at the Chantiers de l'Atlantique shipyard. Her coin ceremony was performed on 27 February 2019. She was floated out on 29 November 2019 and moved to a wet dock to complete construction.

=== Debut ===
MSC Virtuosa was originally scheduled to be delivered in October 2020 and sail her maiden voyage on 8 November 2020 from Genoa. Due to the COVID-19 pandemic, construction delays arose at the shipyard and slowed the ship's construction progress. The delivery took place on 1 February 2021 with a traditional flag ceremony at the Chantiers de l'Atlantique shipyard. She entered service on 20 May 2021 sailing from Southampton.

=== Operational career ===
MSC Virtuosa was scheduled to begin sailing weekly itineraries in the Western Mediterranean in autumn 2020. However, due to the construction delays, MSC Grandiosa replaced all of the ship's scheduled itineraries through the winter 2020–2021 season. She entered service on 20 May 2021 with a series of three and four-night cruises from Southampton, before beginning seven-night cruises around the British Isles on 12 June with three embarkation ports in England and Scotland. These cruises sailed to ports such as Portland, Liverpool, Greenock and Belfast and are exclusively for UK residents. She was originally scheduled to cruise in Northern Europe and the Baltic region for the spring 2021 season, however these cruises were operated by MSC Seaview instead. She re-positioned to Dubai in autumn 2021, where she was based throughout the winter, sailing 7-day itineraries in the Persian Gulf to the UAE, Qatar, Saudi Arabia and Oman.

In 2022, Virtuosa returned to Southampton for a summer season from May until November 2022. Whilst in Southampton she performed 2–14 night cruises to regions including Northern Europe, Baltics, Norwegian Fjords and the Canary Islands. On 7 November 2026, Virtuosa departed Southampton for the final time on a series of one-way itineraries to Southern Europe, then to Brazil for her winter 2026–2027 season. Then, she will re-position to Barcelona through summer 2027. MSC Meraviglia will replace Virtuosa, arriving in Southampton on May 29, 2027.

Southampton is her main embarkation port during the season, with additional embarkation ports of Malaga, Spain and Lisbon, Portugal. In August 2022, it was announced Virtuosa will be based in Southampton year-round and into summer 2023.

The 2023-current British TV series The Good Ship Murder filmed scenes aboard Virtuosa while she was based in Southampton.

On 27 October 2025, Virtuosa entered dry dock for the first time since her launch at Damen Verolme Rotterdam, carrying out routine maintenance, without a focus on cosmetic upgrades. She will depart the dry dock on 19 November 2025 at 17:00 CEST, commencing a 17-night transatlantic repositioning cruise to the Caribbean.

=== Incidents ===
On 12 October 2024, a woman in her 20s died after going overboard from the MSC Virtuosa, which was sailing towards Southampton. An alert was sent out at 02:00 BST, for a search, north of Les Casquets rocks, west of Alderney. French fire and rescue services winched the casualty with a helicopter crew, and the woman was later pronounced dead by doctors. An investigation of the death is ongoing with French police.

On 3 May 2025, a 60-year old man died as a result of an altercation on board MSC Virtuosa, which had departed Southampton at 18:00 BST for a two-night voyage to Bruges, Belgium. British authorities were made aware of the man's death, at 20:30 BST, as the vessel was still in British waters at the time. On 5 May 2025 at 06:00 BST, when the vessel returned to Southampton, a 57-year old man was arrested by Hampshire and Isle of Wight Constabulary on suspicion of murder; he was later released on bail. On 11 May 2025, a 56-year-old man was arrested on suspicion of manslaughter but was later released on bail.

== Design and engineering ==
Like MSC Grandiosa, MSC Virtuosa is equipped with a selective catalytic reduction system that helps to reduce nitrogen oxide emissions by 80 percent, along with a closed-loop exhaust gas cleaning system that reduces ship sulfur emissions by 97 percent. She is capable of running on shorepower when docked at ports.
