= MSC Cruises =

Cruise line registered in Switzerland

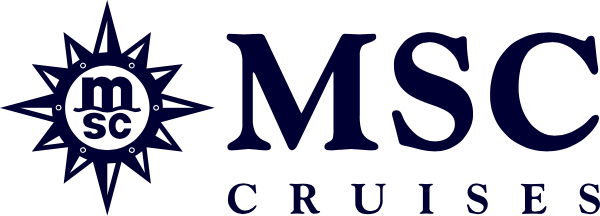

- Type: Privately held company
- Industry: Transportation
- Founded: 1988; 38 years ago Naples, Italy
- Founder: Gianluigi Aponte
- Headquarters: Geneva, Switzerland
- Area served: Worldwide
- Products: Cruises
- Number of employees: 23,500
- Parent: Mediterranean Shipping Company
- Subsidiaries: Explora Journeys
- Website: www.msccruises.com

MSC Cruises S.A. (Italian: MSC Crociere, French: MSC Croisières, German: MSC Kreuzfahrten) is global cruise line founded in 1988 in Naples as part of the Mediterranean Shipping Company (MSC) and based in Geneva (Switzerland); it has operations offices in Naples, Genoa and Venice. In addition to being the world's largest privately held cruise company, employing about 23,500 people worldwide and with offices in 45 countries as of 2017, MSC Cruises is the third-largest cruise company in the world, after Carnival Corporation and the Royal Caribbean Group, with a 10% share of all passengers carried in 2025.

== History ==
=== StarLauro Cruises ===
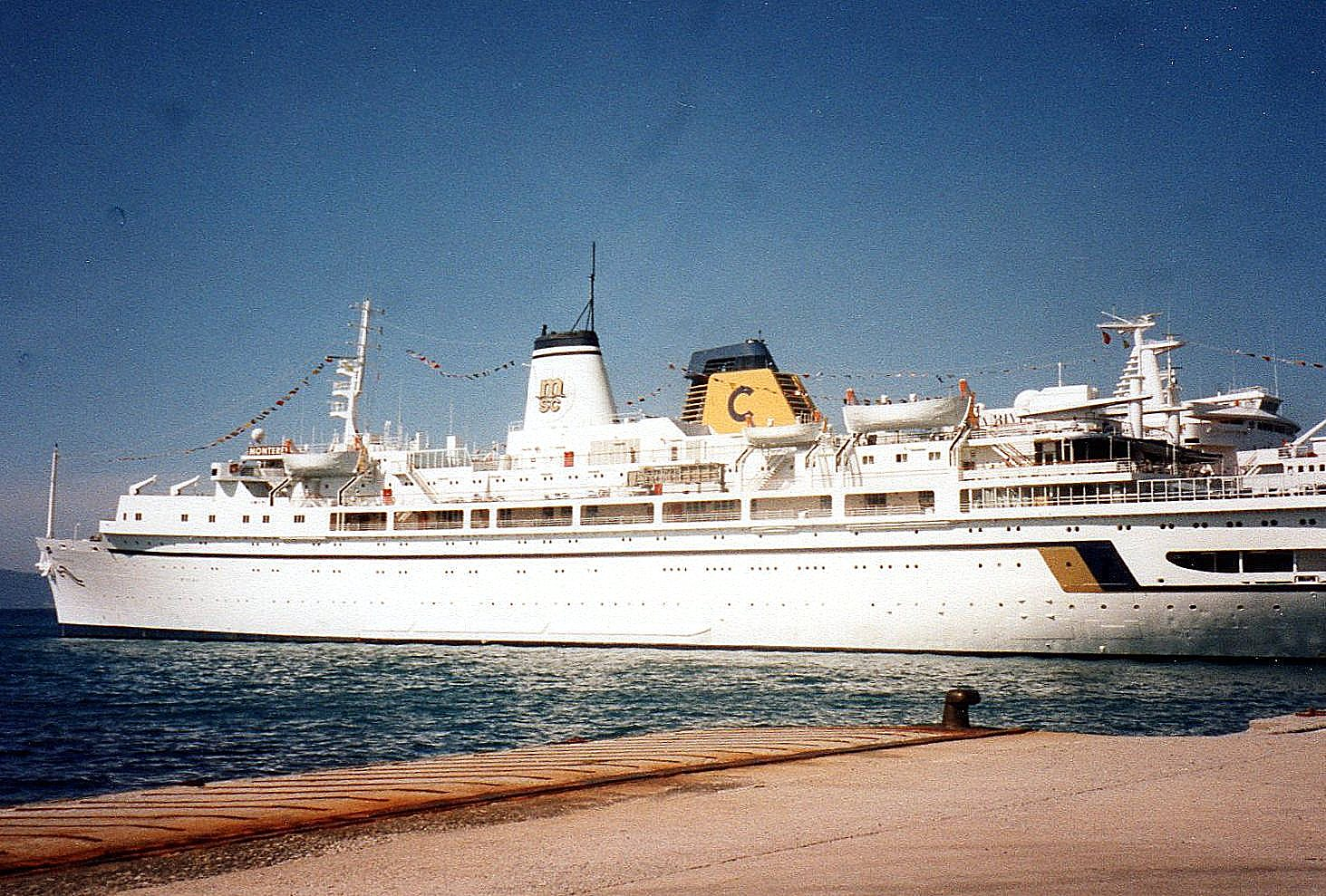
MSC Monterey, one of the line's first ships

In 1988, Gianluigi Aponte, founder of the Mediterranean Shipping Company, decided to enter the cruise industry and purchased the Achille Lauro from Flotta Lauro Line. He retained "Lauro" in the company name in honour of his mentor, naming the new cruise line StarLauro Cruises. The original Lauro Lines (Italian: Flotta Lauro) was originally founded in Naples, Italy by Achille Lauro in the 1940s.

In 1990, Mediterranean Shipping Co. purchased the Monterey to sail for their StarLauro Cruises brand. The ship retained the original name she had used while sailing with Matson Lines. Both the Monterey and Achille Lauro would sail under the StarLauro Cruises banner into the early 1990s. In November 1994, the Achille Lauro caught fire off the coast of Somalia while en route to South Africa, with 979 passengers and crew aboard, two of whom died during the evacuation.

StarLauro line went on to acquire the Enrico C from Costa Cruises, renaming the ship Symphony, and the former Cunard Princess, renaming the ship Rhapsody to the fleet.

=== MSC Cruises ===
In 1995, StarLauro Cruises was rebranded as MSC Cruises, with the livery changed from the blue funnel star logo to a white funnel with the MSC logo.

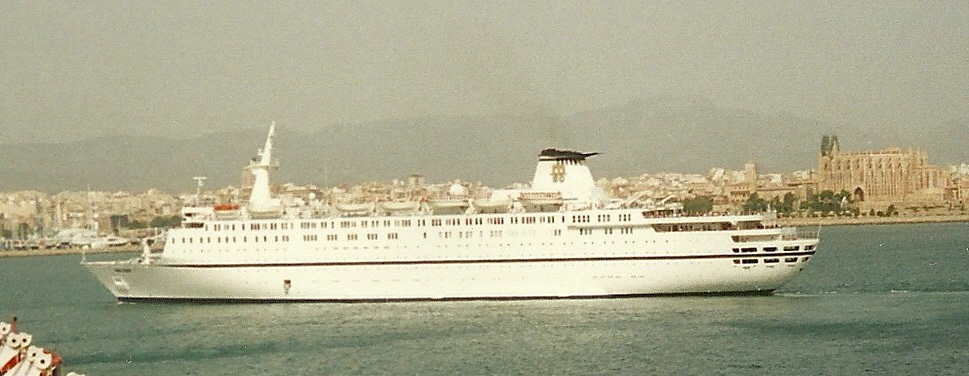
Melody, purchased by MSC in 1997

In 1997, MSC purchased the Atlantic from Premier Cruise Lines, and renamed the ship Melody.

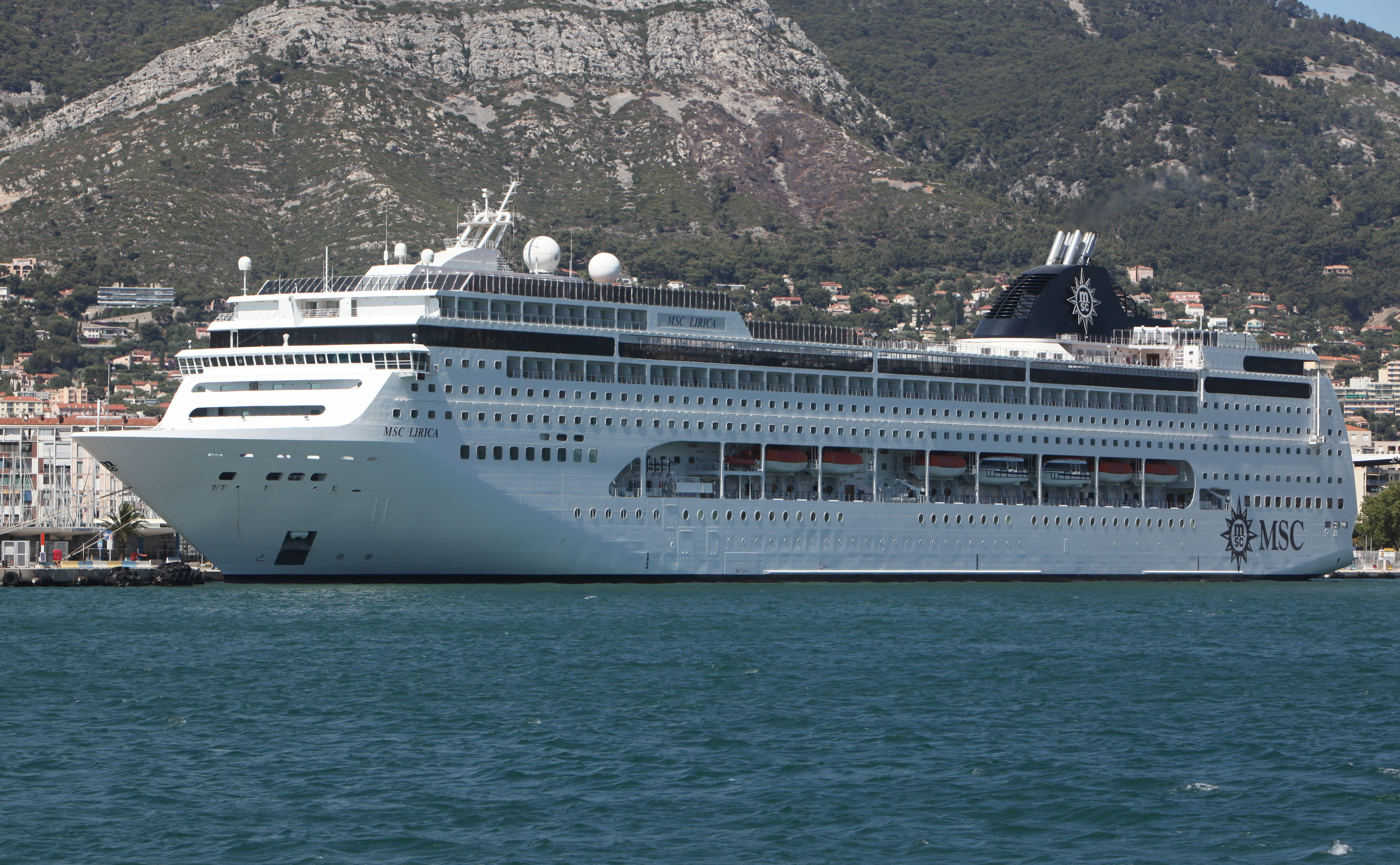
MSC Lirica, MSC Cruises' first purpose-built ship

In the early 2000s, MSC initiated a rapid expansion program, and placed its first new build orders with Chantiers de l'Atlantique shipyard, for 65,000-ton ships. Based on a similar design to the French yard's platform for Festival Cruises, the two-ship order started the aggressive expansion of the cruise line. The line's first new build, the MSC Lirica, debuted in 2003. The Lirica also became the first MSC ship to be christened by Sophia Loren, a tradition that has continued for all but one of the company's new builds. The Lirica was followed by sister ship MSC Opera in 2004.

In 2004, MSC Cruises acquired the fairly newly built European Vision and European Stars from the bankrupt Festival Cruises, renaming the ships MSC Armonia and MSC Sinfonia.

In 2006, the first of the four Musica Class debuted, also built at STX France. The MSC Musica was followed by the MSC Orchestra, MSC Poesia, and the final, slightly modified, MSC Magnifica in 2010.

In 2015, MSC Cruises announced that the four Mistral class ships had undergone renovation under the Renaissance Programme.

In July 2018, the company announced that it would build a second cruise terminal at PortMiami for its World-class cruise ships as an expansion of its North American program. It was scheduled to be completed in October 2022.

In October 2018, MSC announced an order for four luxury ships of 64,000 gross tons each. These ultra-luxury vessels were to be based on the cruise line's luxury concept, the MSC Yacht Club.

In January 2019, MSC Cruises unveiled the world's first virtual personal cruise assistant — ZOE, an artificial intelligence device designed by Harman International. It is currently featured on MSC Bellissima and MSC Grandiosa, and will be featured on future new builds upon their delivery.

In mid-2020, MSC Cruises suspended most (or all) of their operations for over six months during the COVID-19 pandemic. On 7 January 2021, MSC announced it would restart cruises with the MSC Grandiosa and MSC Magnifica in the Mediterranean. Passengers were initially limited to residents of the Schengen Area.

In June 2021, MSC announced a new luxury subsidiary brand named Explora Journeys, with four vessels planned, beginning with the Explora I.

In March 2022, MSC Cruises signed a multi-year deal with Formula One to become their official cruise partner. They were the title sponsor of the 2023 Belgian Grand Prix.

In January 2023, MSC Cruises announced a new multi-year partnership agreement with the New York Knicks. The deal gets MSC promotion during Knicks home games, including LED signage, virtual-on-court signage, and the opportunity to serve as the presenting partner during in-game t-shirt tosses.

In August 2024, Shipping Italy reported rumors that MSC was in talks with Meyer Turku to build a class of four ships with a gross tonnage of 270,000, which would make it bigger than any other cruise ship at the time.

In April 2025, MSC Cruise Division inaugurated the new MSC Barcelona Cruse Terminal, the first fully owned MSC Cruse terminal

will serve MSC Cruises and MSC's Explora Journeys.

In May 2025, MSC Cruise Division inaugurated the new MSC Miami Cruise Terminal, the world's largest cruise terminal.

On November 7, 2025, MSC Cruise Division inaugurated the new Galveston Cruise Terminal 16, Galveston's fourth cruise terminal.

On December 15, 2025, MSC Cruise Division announced an order of a new class of four ships. With a maximum passenger capacity of 5,400 and approximately 180,000 gross tons gross tons each, the “New Frontier” ships will be delivered annually starting in 2030.

== Ocean Cay - MSC Marine Reserve ==
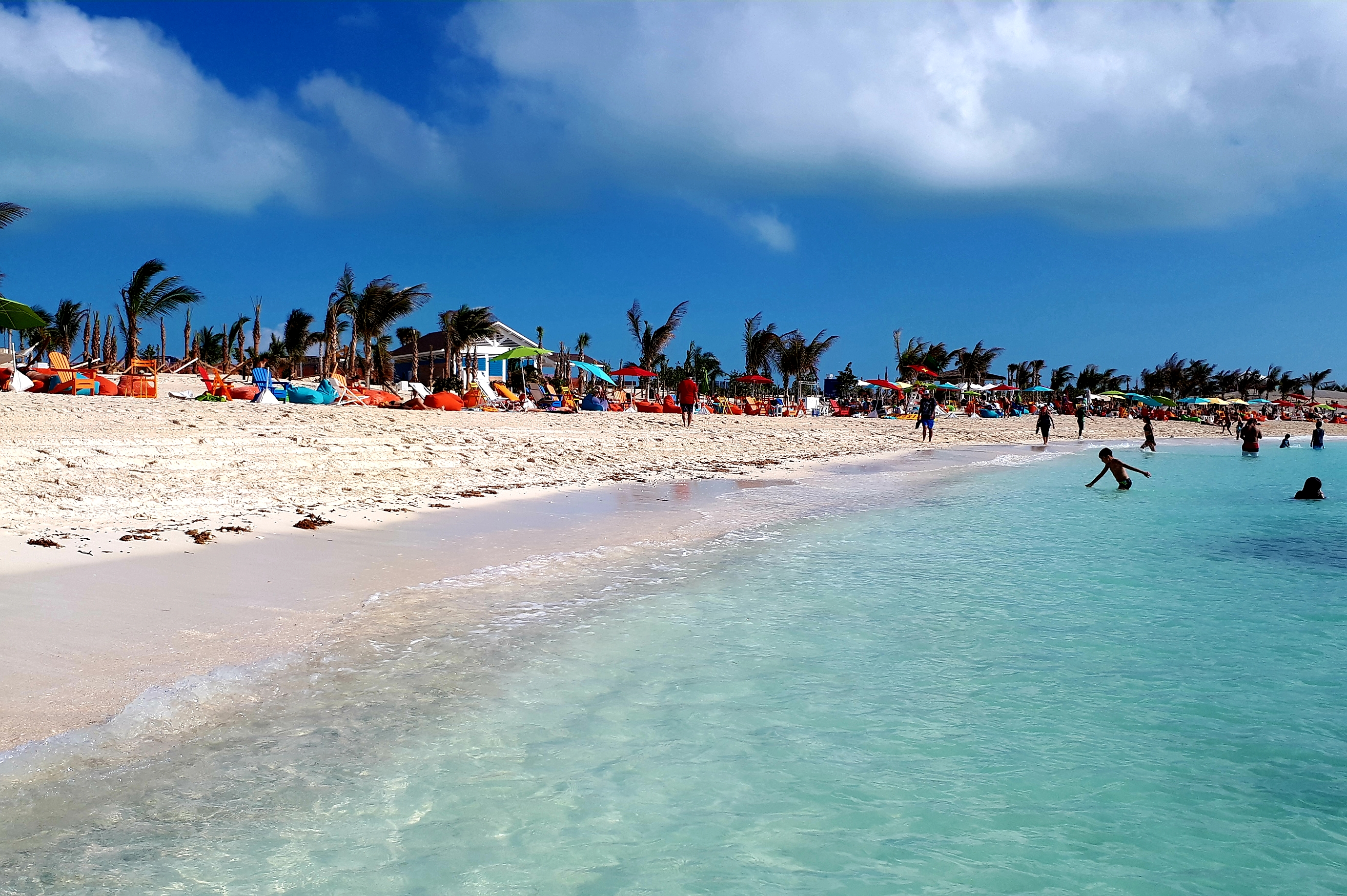
The man-made lagoon located in the middle of Ocean Cay

In December 2015, MSC Cruises signed a 100-year lease for the private island of Ocean Cay in the Bahamas to develop the land for an exclusive island experience. The site had previously been used to mine white Aragonite sand for decades. After the original owners abandoned the 95-acre (38 ha) island, the land had to be restored to remove all of the old mining equipment, with MSC Cruises committing $200 million for the project, involving restoration and conversion of the island into a private resort.

The restoration required the work of many scientists to bring the area back into a functioning marine habitat. Once the Bahamian government granted the site marine reserve status, the project was officially named the Ocean Cay MSC Marine Reserve and was set to open in mid-November 2019. However, weather delays pushed the date to 5 December 2019.

== Fleet ==
=== Current fleet ===
Ship	Built	Builder	Joined MSC	Gross tonnage	Flag	Notes	Image
Mistral-class
MSC Armonia	2001	Chantiers de l'Atlantique	May 2004	65,542	Panama	Built as the MS European Vision for Festival Cruises	
MSC Sinfonia	2002	Chantiers de l'Atlantique	March 2005	65,542	Panama	Built as the MS European Stars for Festival Cruises	
MSC Lirica	2003	Chantiers de l'Atlantique	March 2003	65,591	Panama	First purpose-built new build for MSC Cruises	
MSC Opera	2004	Chantiers de l'Atlantique	March 2004	65,591	Panama		
Musica class
MSC Musica	2006	Aker Yards (Saint-Nazaire)	July 2006	92,409	Panama		
MSC Orchestra	2007	Aker Yards (Saint-Nazaire)	May 2007	92,409	Panama		
MSC Poesia	2008	Aker Yards/STX Europe (Saint-Nazaire)	Oct 2008	92,627	Panama		
MSC Magnifica	2010	STX Europe (Saint-Nazaire)	March 2010	95,128	Panama	Modified Musica class	
Fantasia class
MSC Fantasia	2008	Aker Yards/STX Europe (Saint-Nazaire)	Dec 2008	137,936	Panama		
MSC Splendida	2009	Aker Yards/STX Europe (Saint-Nazaire)	July 2009	137,936	Panama		
MSC Divina	2012	STX Europe (Saint-Nazaire)	June 2012	139,400	Panama	Modified Fantasia class	
MSC Preziosa	2013	STX Europe (Saint-Nazaire)	March 2013	139,400	Panama	Modified Fantasia class	
Seaside class
MSC Seaside	2017	Fincantieri	Nov 2017	153,516	Malta		
MSC Seaview	2018	Fincantieri	June 2018	153,516	Malta		
Seaside EVO-class
MSC Seashore	2021	Fincantieri	August 2021	170,412	Malta		
MSC Seascape	2022	Fincantieri	November 2022	170,400	Malta		
Meraviglia class
MSC Meraviglia	2017	STX Europe (Saint-Nazaire)	May 2017	171,598	Malta		
MSC Bellissima	2019	Chantiers de l'Atlantique	March 2019	171,598	Malta		
Meraviglia Plus-class
MSC Grandiosa	2019	Chantiers de l'Atlantique	November 2019	181,541	Malta		
MSC Virtuosa	2021	Chantiers de l'Atlantique	May 2021	181,541	Malta		
MSC Euribia	2023	Chantiers de l'Atlantique	May 2023	184,011	Malta	Second ship powered by liquid natural gas (LNG) to join the fleet.	MSC Euribia - 3 juin 2023 - Saint-Nazaire, France
World Class
MSC World Europa	2022	Chantiers de l'Atlantique	December 2022	215,863	Malta	Originally named MSC Europa. Largest ship built for MSC Cruises and first in the fleet powered by LNG with solid oxide fuel cell (SOFC) and having "G"-shape bow design.	
MSC World America	2025	Chantiers de l'Atlantique	March 2025	216,638	Malta	LNG-fueled cruise ship. Construction started on 22 October 2022. Sea Trials completed and delivered in March 2025	

=== Future ships ===
Ship	Due to enter service	Builder	Gross tonnage	Notes	Image
World class
MSC World Asia	2026	Chantiers de l'Atlantique	216,638	LNG-fueled cruise ship	
MSC World Atlantic	2027	Chantiers de l'Atlantique	216,638	LNG-fueled cruise ship	
MSC World Oceania	2028	Chantiers de l'Atlantique	216,638	LNG-fueled cruise ship	
World Class 6	2029	Chantiers de l'Atlantique	216,638	LNG-fueled cruise ship	
World Class 7	2030	Chantiers de l'Atlantique	216,638	LNG-fueled cruise ship	
World Class 8	2031	Chantiers de l'Atlantique	216,638	LNG-fueled cruise ship	
New Frontier class
New Frontier Class 1	2030	Meyer Werft	180,000	LNG-fueled cruise ship	
New Frontier Class 2	2031	Meyer Werft	180,000	LNG-fueled cruise ship	
New Frontier Class 3	2032	Meyer Werft	180,000	LNG-fueled cruise ship	
New Frontier Class 4	2033	Meyer Werft	180,000	LNG-fueled cruise ship	

=== Former fleet ===
Ship	Built	Builder	In service for MSC	Gross tonnage	Notes	Image
Achille Lauro	1947	Scheepsbouw-Maatschappij De Schelde, Vlissingen, Netherlands	1988–1994	23,629	Built for Royal Rotterdam Lloyd as the MS Willem Ruys. Sank after catching fire in 1994.	
Monterey	1952	Bethlehem Shipbuilding Corp., Maryland, United States	1990–2006	20,000	Originally known as SS Free State Mariner. Previously Monterey for Matson Lines and Monterey for Aloha Pacific Cruises. Scrapped in 2007.	
Symphony	1951	Swan Hunter and Wigham Richardson, England	1994–2000	16,000	Previously Provence for SGTM Line and Enrico C for Costa Cruises. Scrapped in 2001.	
Rhapsody	1977	Burmeister & Wain, Denmark	1995–2009	17,095	Previously Cunard Conquest and Cunard Princess for Cunard Line. Scrapped in 2022.	
Melody	1982	CNIM (La Seyne-sur-Mer), France	1997–2013	35,143	Previously Atlantic for Home Lines and StarShip Atlantic for Premier Cruise Line. Scrapped in 2018.	

== See also ==
- Explora Journeys
- List of cruise lines
- Mediterranean Shipping Company
- Private island
