= Explora Journeys =

Luxury cruise line

- Type: Privately held company
- Industry: Transportation
- Founded: 2021
- Headquarters: Geneva, Switzerland
- Area served: Worldwide
- Products: Cruises
- Parent: Mediterranean Shipping Company
- Website: explorajourneys.com

Explora Journeys is a Geneva, Switzerland-based cruise line that was founded in 2021 as the luxury cruise division of Mediterranean Shipping Company (MSC). It is a sister company of MSC Cruises.

== History ==
In October 2018, Mediterranean Shipping Company announced an order with Fincantieri for four luxury cruise ships. This was later increased to six, with deliveries running through to 2028.

The line's first ship, Explora I completed its sea trials in April 2023. Delivery was delayed due to faulty fire panels. Its first cruise began on 1 August 2023 departing from Copenhagen.

== Fleet ==
By September 2024, the line's fleet consisted of two ships with four more vessels planned. By July 2025, MSC Group had invested €3.5 billion in ship construction, with three ships, Explora III, IV, and V, reaching ship-building milestones. Explora's third ship is scheduled to leave from Barcelona in August 2026. Three more vessels are planned for departures in 2027 and 2028, and Explora plans to include cruises to Asia and the Far East.

=== Current fleet ===
Explora class
Name	Built	Shipyard	In service	Tonnage	Flag	Notes	Image
Explora I	2023	Fincantieri	August 2023	63,621	Malta	First ship in MSC Group's luxury brand, Explora Journeys. Delivered on 20 July 2023.	
Explora II	2024	Fincantieri	September 2024	63,621	Malta	Keel laid on 5 May 2022. Delivered on 12 September 2024.	
Explora III	2026	Fincantieri	July 2026	72,810	Malta	First LNG-powered ship in the fleet. Delivered in July 2026 and entered service with a Mediterranean Prelude Journey on 24 July 2026.	

=== Future fleet ===
Explora class
Name	Built	Shipyard	Tonnage	Notes
Explora IV	2027	Fincantieri	72,810 (planned)	LNG-fueled cruise ship
Explora V	2027	Fincantieri	72,810 (planned)	LNG-powered cruise ship with hydrogen-ready technology
Explora VI	2028	Fincantieri	72,810 (planned)	LNG-powered cruise ship with hydrogen-ready technology
