= Chantiers de l'Atlantique =

French shipyard

Coordinates: 47.2831°N 2.1886°W

- Type: Private
- Industry: Shipbuilding
- Founded: 1862; 164 years ago
- Headquarters: Saint-Nazaire, France
- Revenue: ▲€2.54 billion (2024)
- Operating income: ▲€183 million (2023)
- Owner: French state: 84.3% Naval Group: 11.7% Employees: 2.1% COFIPME: 1.6%
- Number of employees: 3,913 (2025)
- Website: Chantiers de l'Atlantique

Chantiers de l'Atlantique is a shipyard in Saint-Nazaire, France. It is Europe’s largest shipyard and one of the world's largest, constructing a wide range of commercial, naval, and passenger ships. The Dock STX Europe is the fourth largest shipbuilding hall and the sixth-largest usable volume in the world as of 2025. It is located near Nantes, at the mouth of the Loire river and the deep waters of the Atlantic, which make the sailing of large ships in and out of the shipyards easy.

The shipyard was owned by Alstom from 1976 onwards, became Alstom-Atlantique, and was later part of Aker Yards when Aker Group acquired the Alstom Marine business in 2006. In 2008, the South Korean company STX Corporation acquired Aker Yards, and the shipyard became part of STX Europe (formed by the renaming of Aker Yards).

After the bankruptcy of STX Corporation, the shipyard was acquired by the French government and reverted to its original name of Chantiers de l'Atlantique.

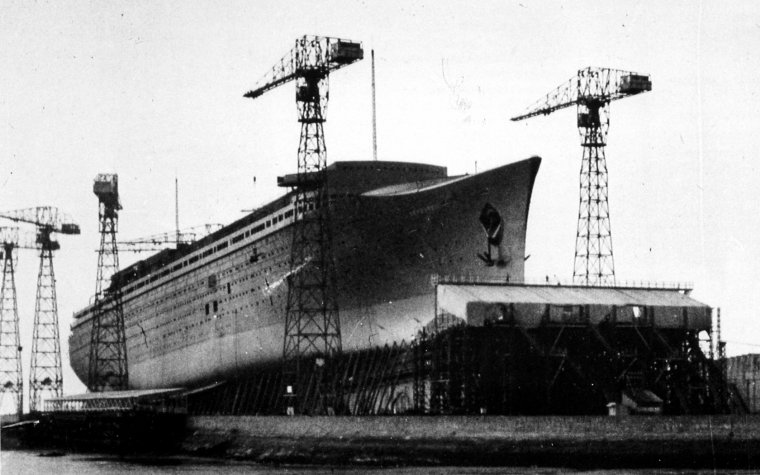
Normandie under construction

== History ==
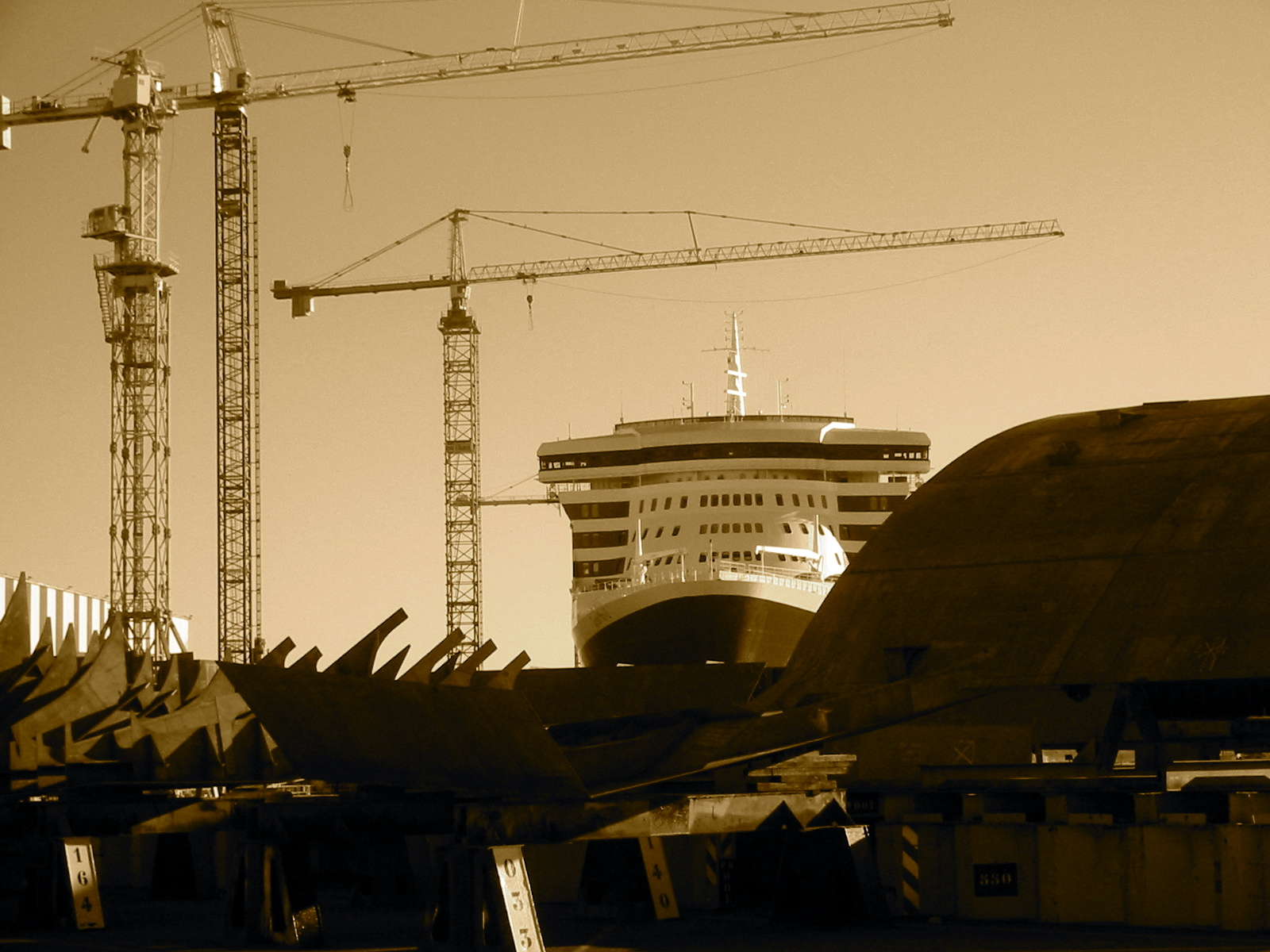
The giant ocean liner Queen Mary 2 under construction

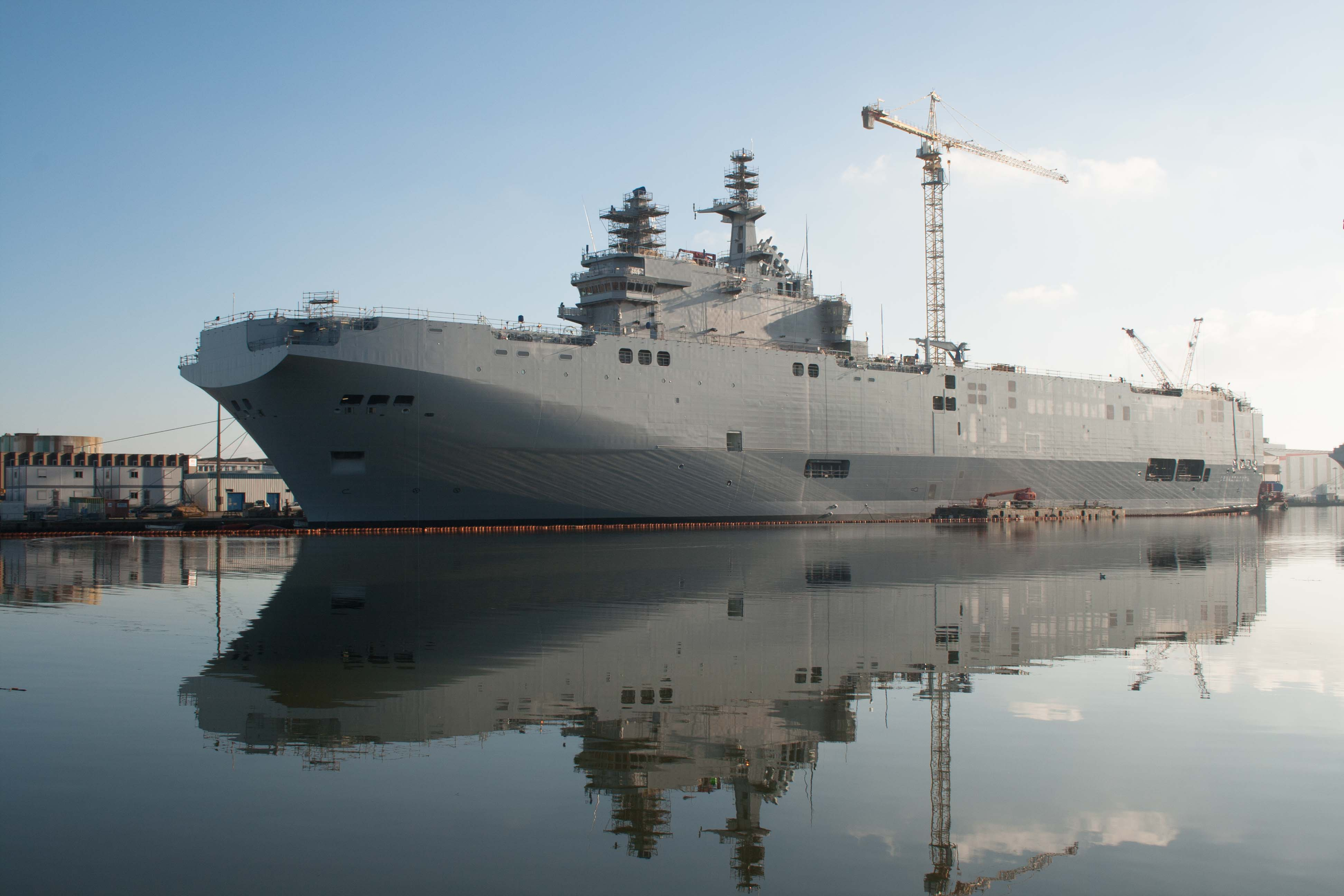
Russian amphibious assault ship Sevastopol awaiting delivery, December 2014

The current Chantiers de l'Atlantique yard evolved from the Ateliers et Chantiers de Saint-Nazaire Penhoët, Saint-Nazaire, France, famous for building the transatlantic liners: France, Île de France, and Normandie.

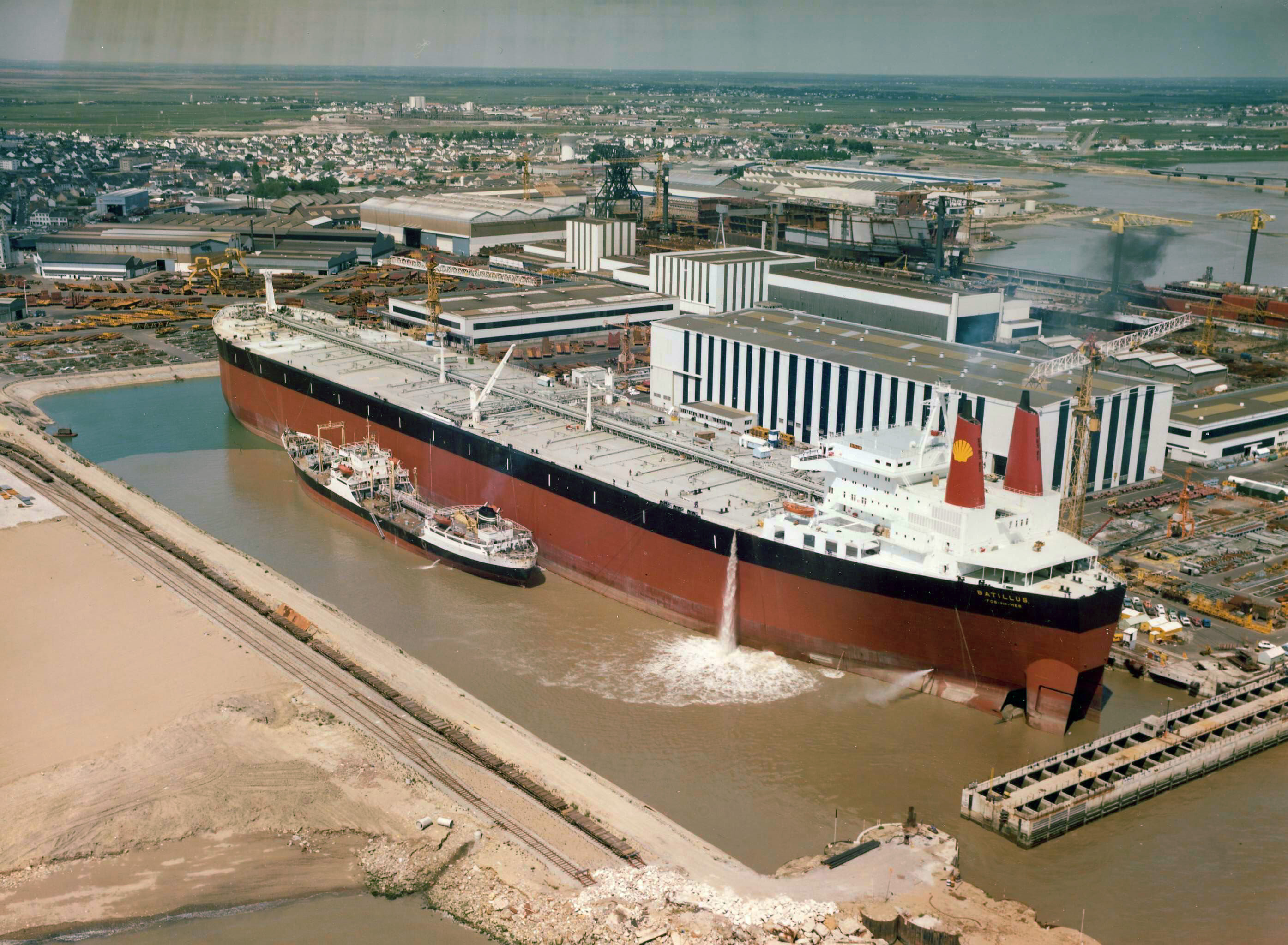
The oil tanker Batillus at the end of its construction in Saint-Nazaire, being refueled by the Port-Vendres

It was renamed to its current name in 1955 by the merger of Ateliers et Chantiers de la Loire and Ateliers et Chantiers de Penhoët. In 1961, it built the transatlantic ocean liner France, the world's longest passenger vessel only overall, but not at the waterline. After the construction of the last Compagnie Générale Transatlantique liner and the closure of the Suez Canal, the yard began building large tankers, including Batillus, Bellamya, Pierre Guillaumat and Prairial. A new dry dock was built for this purpose and allowed the construction of tankers exceeding one million tonnes, but it remained mainly unused except for the construction in 1975–1976 of the sister ships Gastor and Nestor and then again idle until construction of Cunard's liner Queen Mary 2.

Between 1985 and 1998, the shipyard built several cruise ships for Royal Caribbean Cruise Line (RCCL). In 1987 the first of these ships, Sovereign of the Seas, was delivered, and was the first mega cruise ship in the world. Subsequent deliveries to RCCL included Monarch of the Seas, Majesty of the Seas, Nordic Empress, Legend of the Seas, Splendour of the Seas, Rhapsody of the Seas, and Vision of the Seas. In 2003, the shipyard also delivered Crystal Serenity to Crystal Cruises and Queen Mary 2 to Cunard. During the construction of RMS Queen Mary 2, a gangway to the dry-docked ship collapsed, killing sixteen people.

On 4 January 2006 Aker Yards purchased the Marine Division of Alstom, which included the Chantiers de l'Atlantique shipyard. In March 2007 Aker ASA divested its interest in Aker Yards, with South Korean STX Corporation acquiring a 39.2% stake in Aker Yards in October. By 3 November 2008 STX Corporation had acquired a controlling stake in the company, renaming it to STX Europe. The same year, the French government purchased a 33.34% stake in the shipyard.

After the bankruptcy of STX Corporation in 2016, STX France was put up for sale, and the Italian state-owned shipyard Fincantieri showed interest in acquiring STX France.

In September 2017, after difficult negotiations and a brief nationalization of the shipyard by the French government, the involved parties reached an agreement, with Fincantieri acquiring a 50% stake in STX France, and the remainder being held by the French Naval Group and the French government. A month later, it was announced that the Saint-Nazaire shipyard would regain its original name, Chantiers de l'Atlantique.

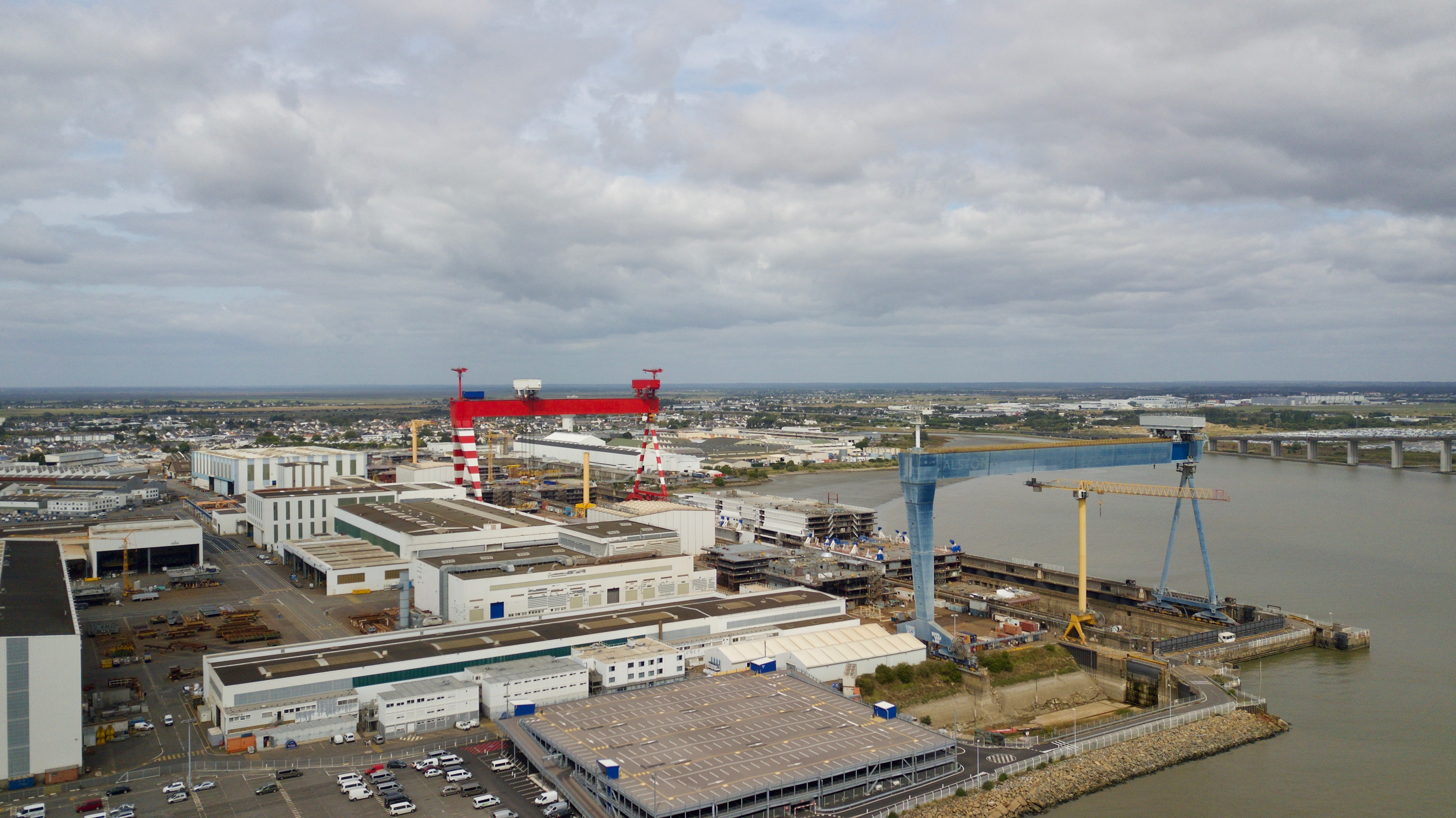
The shipyard in 2018

In 2022, a new crane entered service during the construction of Celebrity Ascent, replacing the older crane from 1967.

== Ships ==
Notable passenger liners built by at the Chantiers de l'Atlantique yard (former Ateliers et Chantiers de Saint-Nazaire Penhoët) include:

Passenger ships
Ship name (as built)	Year delivered	Built for	Current status	Notes
1910s
SS France	1912	Compagnie Générale Transatlantique	Scrapped 1936	
1920s
SS Paris	1921	Compagnie Générale Transatlantique	Burned and Capsized at Dock 1939, Scrapped 1947	
SS Ile de France	1927	Compagnie Générale Transatlantique	Scrapped 1959	Was used as a "movie prop" in the film The Last Voyage, prior to scrapping.
1930s
MS Lafayette	1930	Compagnie Générale Transatlantique	Burned, scrapped	
SS L'Atlantique	1931	Compagnie de Navigation Sud Atlantique	Burned, and scrapped	
SS Champlain	1932	Compagnie Générale Transatlantique	Sunk WWII	
SS Normandie	1935	Compagnie Générale Transatlantique	Burned and Capsized at Dock 1942, Scrapped 1948	It was the world's largest ship until Cunard's Queen Elizabeth, held Blue Riband. Capsized in New York Harbor, 1942. Scrapped in NJ, 1946.
SS Pasteur	1939	Compagnie de Navigation Sud-Atlantique	Sank 1980 on way to scrap yard	
1950s
SS Bretagne	1952	Société Générale de Transport Maritimes	Scrapped 1963	
MS General Mangin	1953	Cie de Nav Fraissinet et Cyprien Fabre	Scrapped 1986	
MV Jean Mermoz	1957	Cie de Nav Fraissinet et Cyprien Fabre	Scrapped 2008	
1960s
SS France	1962	Compagnie Générale Transatlantique	Scrapped 2008	Launched in 1961, the world's longest passenger ship from 1961 to 2004, became the SS Norway.
MS Ancerville	1962	Compagnie de Navigation Paquet	Hotel Ship	A former passenger ship built in 1962, integrated as part of Sea World, a multi-purpose complex in Shenzhen, China since 1983.
SS Shalom	1964	Zim Israel Navigation Company	Sank on way to Scrap Yard 2001	Israel flagship (1964).
MS Renaissance	1966	Compagnie Francaise de Navigation	Scrapped 2010	A French cruise liner that entered service in 1966 for service on the Marseilles-Haifa route.
MV Yaohua	1967	China Ocean Shipping Company	Possibly Hotel Ship	Last ship to be launched from slipway at St. Nazaire
1980s
MS Nieuw Amsterdam	1983	Holland America Line	Scrapped 2018	
MS Noordam	1984	Holland America Line	Scrapped 2022	
MS Sovereign of the Seas	1987	Royal Caribbean Cruise Line	Scrapped 2020	Was the largest cruise ship in the world from 1988 to 1990, and its sister ships, MS Monarch of the Seas and MS Majesty of the Seas.
Danielle Casanova	1989	SNCM	In service	Sailing nowadays for Corsica Linea as the Mediterranee.
MS Star Princess	1989	Sitmar Cruises/Princess Cruises	Scrapped 2021	Ordered for Sitmar Cruises as the Fair Majesty
Bretagne	1989	Brittany Ferries	In Service	Car ferry launched in 1989. Sails on the Portsmouth to Saint-Malo route. Brittany Ferries Ex-Flagship.
1990s
Nordic Empress	1990	Admiral Cruises/Royal Caribbean Cruise Line	In Service	Ordered as Future Seas for Admiral Cruises.
Monarch of the Seas	1992	Royal Caribbean Cruise Line	Scrapped 2021	
Majesty of the Seas	1992	Royal Caribbean Cruise Line	Laid up	
Dreamward	1992	Norwegian Cruise Line	Scrapped 2022	
Windward	1993	Norwegian Cruise Line	Scrapped 2022	
Legend of the Seas	1995	Royal Caribbean Cruise Line	In Service	
Splendor of the Seas	1996	Royal Caribbean Cruise Line	In Service	
Napoleon Bonaparte	1996	SNCM	In Service	Sailing nowadays for Grandi Navi Veloci as the Rhapsody.
Rhapsody of the Seas	1997	Royal Caribbean Cruise Line	In Service	
Paul Gauguin	1997	Services Et Transports / Radisson Seven Seas Cruises	In Service	
Vision of the Seas	1998	Royal Caribbean Cruise Line	In Service	
R One	1998	Renaissance Cruises	In Service	8 sister ships
R Two	1998	Renaissance Cruises	In Service	8 sister ships
R Three	1999	Renaissance Cruises	In Service	8 sister ships
R Four	1999	Renaissance Cruises	In Service	8 sister ships
Mistral	1999	Festival Cruises	In Service	
2000s
R Five	2000	Renaissance Cruises	In Service	8 sister ships
R Six	2000	Renaissance Cruises	In Service	8 sister ships
Millennium	2000	Celebrity Cruises	In Service	
R Seven	2000	Renaissance Cruises	In Service	8 sister ships
R Eight	2000	Renaissance Cruises	In Service	8 sister ships
Infinity	2001	Celebrity Cruises	In Service	
Summit	2001	Celebrity Cruises	In Service	
Seven Seas Mariner	2001	Radisson Seven Seas Cruises	In Service	This is the world's first all balcony luxury cruise ship.
European Vision	2001	Festival Cruises	In Service	
European Stars	2002	Festival Cruises	In Service	
Constellation	2002	Celebrity Cruises	In Service	
Coral Princess	2003	Princess Cruises	In Service	
MSC Lirica	2003	MSC Cruises	In Service	
Island Princess	2003	Princess Cruises	In Service	
Crystal Serenity	2003	Crystal Cruises	In Service	
Queen Mary 2	2004	Cunard Line	In Service	Floated in 2003, is the longest, tallest, widest, and the largest ocean liner, and at the time of her construction, the largest passenger ship, and is currently the only ship to undergo regularly scheduled transatlantic crossings.
MSC Opera	2004	MSC Cruises	In Service	
MSC Musica	2006	MSC Cruises	In Service	
MSC Orchestra	2007	MSC Cruises	In Service	
MSC Poesia	2008	MSC Cruises	In Service	
MSC Fantasia	2008	MSC Cruises	In Service	
MSC Splendida	2009	MSC Cruises	In Service	
2010s
Norwegian Epic	2010	Norwegian Cruise Line	In Service	
MSC Magnifica	2010	MSC Cruises	In Service	
MSC Divina	2012	MSC Cruises	In Service	
MSC Preziosa	2013	MSC Cruises	In Service	
Europa 2	2013	Hapag & Lloyd	In Service	
Harmony of the Seas	2016	Royal Caribbean Cruise Line	In Service	
MSC Meraviglia	2017	MSC Cruises	In Service	
Symphony of the Seas	2018	Royal Caribbean Cruise Line	In Service	
Celebrity Edge	2018	Celebrity Cruises	In Service	
MSC Bellissima	2019	MSC Cruises	In Service	
MSC Grandiosa	2019	MSC Cruises	In Service	
2020s
Celebrity Apex	2020	Celebrity Cruises	In Service	
MSC Virtuosa	2021	MSC Cruises	In Service	
Wonder of the Seas	2021	Royal Caribbean International	In service	World's third largest cruise ship as of 2024 (236,857 GT)
Celebrity Beyond	2022	Celebrity Cruises	In service	
MSC World Europa	2022	MSC Cruises	In Service	First in new class of MSC vessels
MSC Euribia	2023	MSC Cruises	In Service	
Celebrity Ascent	2023	Celebrity Cruises	In service	
Utopia of the Seas	2024	Royal Caribbean International	In Service	First LNG powered ship of the class
Ilma	2024	The Ritz-Carlton Yacht Collection	In service	
MSC World America	2025	MSC Cruises	In service	
Luminara	2025	The Ritz-Carlton Yacht Collection	In service	
Celebrity Xcel	2025	Celebrity Cruises	In service	

=== Other ships built at the yard ===
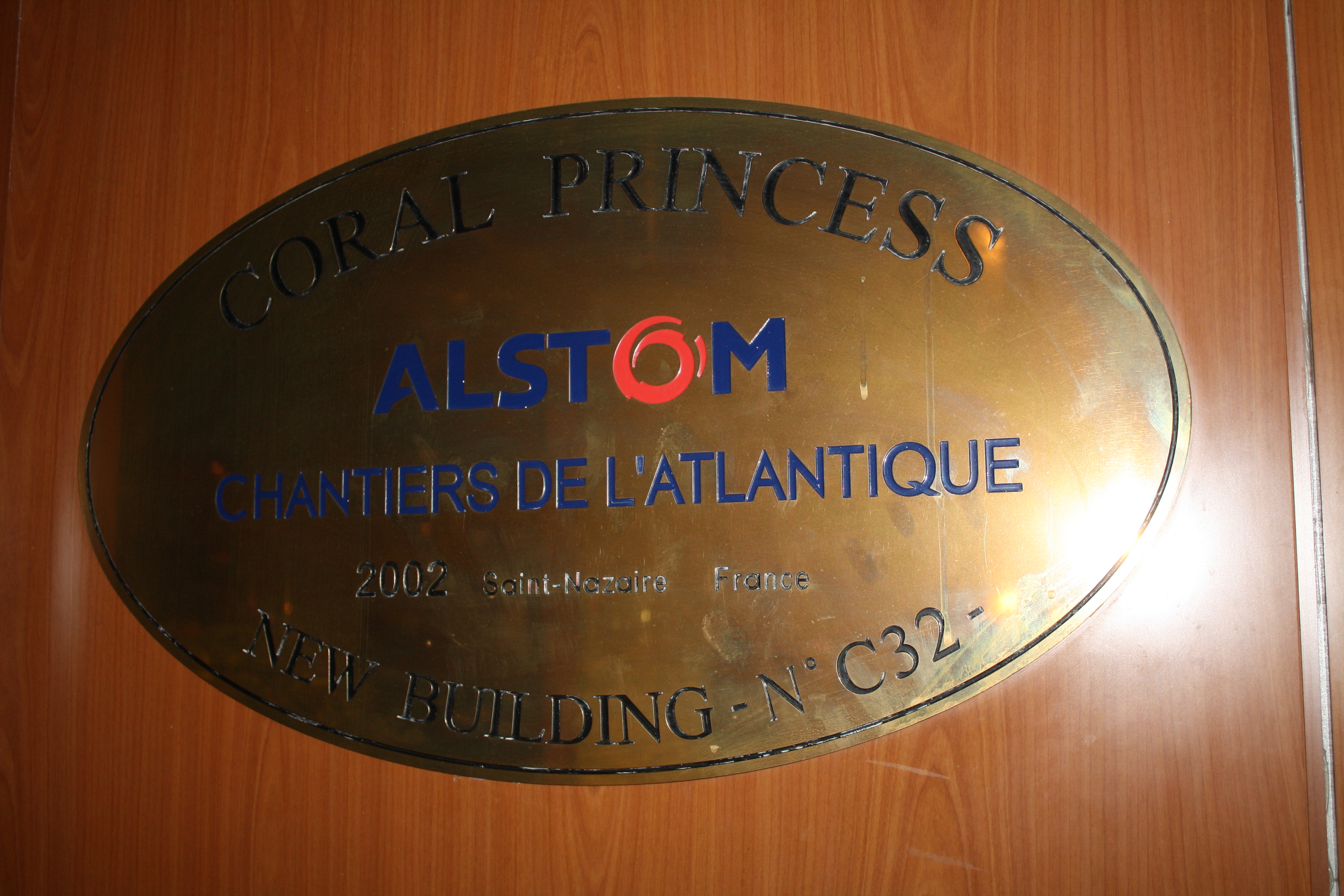
A plaque inside Coral Princess

- Sans Souci class - Four sloops, designed as seaplane tenders, but built as convoy escorts. all launched in 1940.
- Belle Abeto - Built in 1952 as LAENNEC 66 BELLE ABETO passenger/cargo ship.
- Batillus-class supertankers - Four ships launched (1976–1979)
- MV Gastor and MV Nestor - Two LNG carriers built in 1975–1977 for the Dutch NSU (later Nedlloyd) and Ocean Group (later owned by Bonny Gas Transport). The large drydock, which was later used for the Queen Mary 2, was specially built for the building of supertankers in the 1970s, among which were these two ships. The drydock was never used again until the Queen Mary 2 was being built.
- MS Baltic Princess - A part of it was launched in 2008.
- Russian amphibious assault ship Vladivostok (launched 2013) - Later purchased by Egypt.
- Russian amphibious assault ship Sevastopol (launched 2014) - Later purchased by Egypt.

=== Future ships on order ===
Ships on order
Ship name (as built)	Delivery date	Built for	Tonnage	Current status
MSC World Asia	2026	MSC Cruises	205,700	Ordered
Corinthian	2026	Orient Express	30,000	Ordered
Olympian	2027	Orient Express	30,000	Ordered
MSC World Atlantic	2027	MSC Cruises	205,700	Ordered
(Unnamed Oasis Class)	2028	Royal Caribbean International	231,000	Ordered
Celebrity Xcite	2028	Celebrity Cruises	140,600	Ordered
(MSC World Class 5)	2028	MSC Cruises	205,700	Ordered
(MSC World Class 6)	2029	MSC Cruises	205,700	Ordered
(Unnamed Discovery Class)	2029	Royal Caribbean International	TBA	Ordered
(MSC World Class 7)	2030	MSC Cruises	205,700	Ordered
(MSC World Class 8)	2031	MSC Cruises	205,700	Ordered
(Unnamed Discovery Class)	2032	Royal Caribbean International	TBA	Ordered
France Libre	2035	French Navy	80,000	Planned
