= MSC Sinfonia =

Cruise ship operated by MSC Cruises

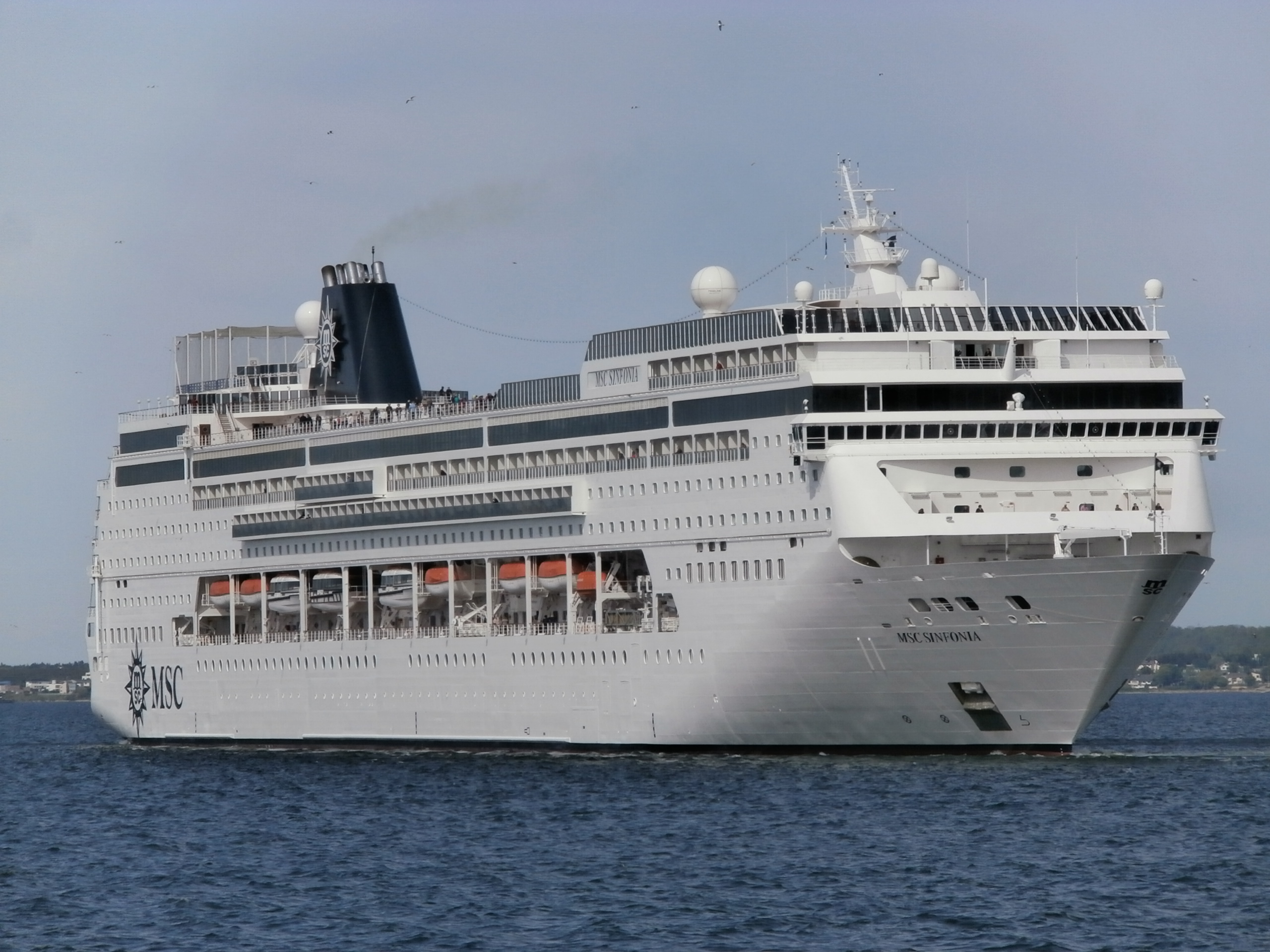
- MSC Sinfonia In Tallinn, Estonia on 27 May 2015

History
- Name: 2002–2004: European Stars; 2004 onwards: MSC Sinfonia
- Owner: 2002–2004: Festival Cruises; 2004 onwards: MSC Cruises
- Operator: 2001–2004: Festival Cruises; 2004 onwards: MSC Cruises
- Port of registry: 2001–2004: Genoa, Italy; 2004 onwards: Panama City, Panama
- Builder: Chantiers de l'Atlantique, St. Nazaire, France
- Cost: $245 million
- Yard number: V31
- Launched: 4 March 2001
- Christened: 19 April 2002
- Acquired: 18 April 2002
- Maiden voyage: 25 April 2002
- Identification: IMO number: 9210153; MMSI number: 356716000; Callsign: H8XH
- Status: In service

General characteristics (as European Stars)
- Class & type: Lirica-class cruise ship
- Tonnage: 58,174 GT; 6,980 DWT
- Length: 275.25 m (903 ft 1 in)
- Beam: 28.8 m (94 ft 6 in)
- Height: 54 m (177 ft 2 in)
- Draught: 6.8 m (22 ft 4 in)
- Installed power: 4 × Wärtsilä 12V38; 31680 kW (combined)
- Speed: 20.8 knots (38.5 km/h; 23.9 mph)
- Capacity: 2,163 passengers

General characteristics (as MSC Sinfonia)
- Class & type: Lirica-class cruise ship
- Tonnage: 58,625 GT; 65,542 GT (after renovation)
- Length: 251.25 m (824.3 ft); 274.9 m (902 ft) (after renovation)
- Beam: 28.8 m (94 ft); 32 m (105 ft) (after renovation)
- Height: 54 m (177 ft)
- Draught: 6.8 m (22 ft 4 in)
- Depth: 6.6 m (22 ft)
- Decks: 9 (passenger accessible); 13 (total)
- Speed: 21.1 knots (39.1 km/h; 24.3 mph)
- Capacity: 2,087 passengers (double occupancy); 2,646 passengers (maximum after renovation)
- Crew: 721
- Notes: Otherwise the same as European Stars

MSC Sinfonia is a cruise ship owned and operated by the Italy-based MSC Cruises. She was built in 2002 by Chantiers de l'Atlantique in Saint-Nazaire, France for the now-defunct Festival Cruises as MS European Stars. She was the last ship built for Festival Cruises.

== Concept and construction ==
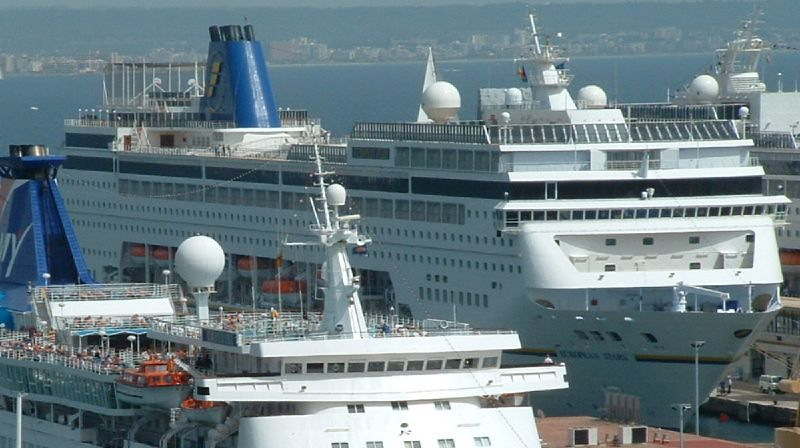
MSC Sinfonia as European Stars in Palma, Majorca, Spain on 1 May 2003.

European Stars was the second in a pair of two sister ships ordered by Festival Cruises from Chantiers de l'Atlantique in Saint-Nazaire, France (the first sister being MS European Vision). The contract price for the ship was $245 million, and her yard number was X31. Both new ships were built on the same platform as MS Mistral, built by the same shipyard for Festival Cruises in 1999, but with an added 35-metre (115 ft) midsection providing more passenger spaces, and one additional deck of cabins with private balconies.

Newbuilding X31 was launched in Saint-Nazaire on 4 March 2001. Following fitting out, she was delivered to Festival Cruises on 18 April 2002 and officially christened European Stars the following day in Saint-Nazaire.

== Service history ==
European Stars entered service for Festival Cruises on 25 April 2002 on a cruise from Barcelona. Her career with Festival proved short, however, as the company went bankrupt in January 2004 and the European Stars was subsequently impounded and laid up in Barcelona on 19 January 2004. The ship remained laid up for several months, until she was sold to MSC Cruises in July 2004 for €220 million and renamed MSC Sinfonia (her sister European Vision also joined the MSC fleet, as MSC Armonia). The MSC Sinfonia entered service with her new owners in March 2005.

== Design ==
=== Exterior design ===
The European Stars and her sister European Vision shared a similar box-like exterior appearance as the Mistral, but with a longer and higher hull, which was said to have improved the ship's external appearance compared to the Mistral. As European Vision the ship had an all-white hull and superstructure, with blue and yellow decorative stripes painted on the hull, and a blue funnel with the yellow F logo of Festival Cruises. As MSC Sinfonia she retained the blue funnel colour but now with the white compass logo of MSC Cruises. Initially her hull was all-white without decorations, but on 2008-04-15 MSC made known their intention to paint their compass logo on the sides of all their ships during 2008.

== Renaissance program ==
A 24-metre (79 ft) section was added to the ship during a 10-week refit beginning on 20 January 2015. The new section consists of 193 extra cabins and weighs 2400 tonnes. The work took place at the Fincantieri shipyard in Palermo, Sicily. The midsection was prebuilt, before being floated to the shipyard.

=== Interior design ===
The interior decorations of the MSC Sinfonia are described as European Moderne by cruise review author Douglas Ward, with minimalist furniture that is in places impractical. The public spaces include two main dining rooms, a self-serve buffet, cafeteria, two-deck high showlounge, a discothèque, several bars, a casino and a library. The lido deck includes two outdoors swimming pool, two thalassotherapy jacuzzis and the Doremi spray park for children.

=== Decks and facilities ===
The ship has eleven decks with passenger-accessible facilities most of which are named after musical composers.
