= MSC Orchestra =

Cruise ship

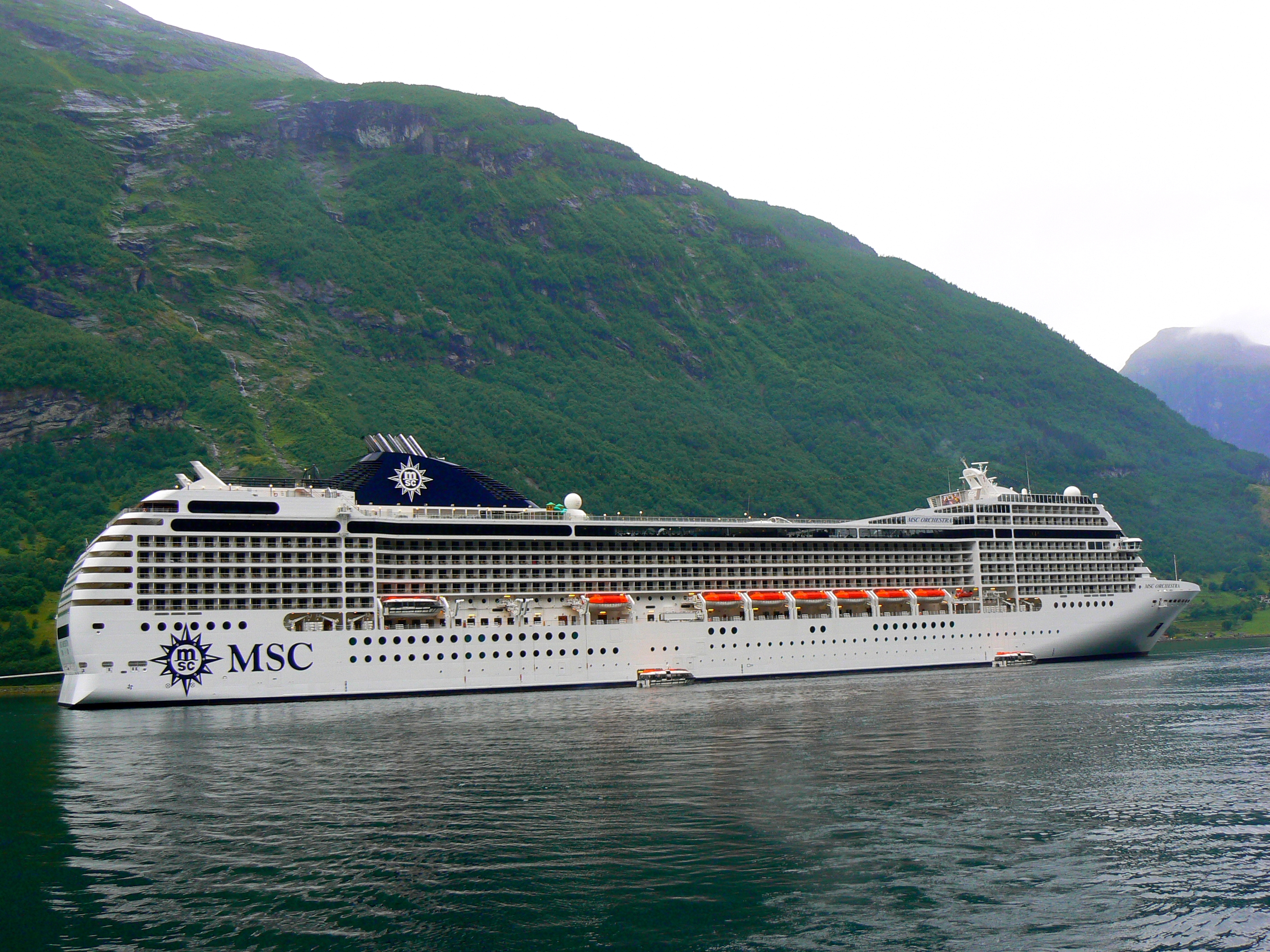
- MSC Orchestra at the Geirangerfjord

History
- Operator: MSC Cruises
- Port of registry: Panama
- Builder: Aker Yards, Chantiers de l'Atlantique
- Cost: US$480 million
- Launched: 9 September 2006
- Completed: 2007
- Identification: IMO number: 9320099; MMSI number: 372497000; Callsign: 3EJF3
- Status: In service

General characteristics
- Class & type: Musica-class cruise ship
- Tonnage: 92,409 GT
- Length: 293.83 m (964.01 ft)
- Beam: 32.31 m (106.00 ft)
- Decks: 13 passenger, 4 crew
- Speed: 23 knots (43 km/h; 26 mph)
- Capacity: 2,550 passengers (as built); 3,200 passengers (after retrofit)
- Crew: 987

MSC Orchestra is a cruise ship that was built in 2007 for MSC Cruises. She is the second ship of the Musica class. She could at the time accommodate 2,550 passengers in 1,275 cabins. Most inside cabins were later refitted with two bunk beds and therefore she can now accommodate 3,200 passengers. Her crew complement is approximately 990.

== Design ==
The cruise ship has length of 293.8 metres (964 ft) and beam of 32.20 metres (105.6 ft). MSC Orchestra has draft of 7.88 metres (25.9 ft) and gross tonnage of 92,409. The ship has capacity for 2,550 passengers and a crew complement of 987.

== Incidents ==
Eight passengers, four Bulgarians and four Lithuanians, were arrested during 2010 after cocaine, worth an estimated £1.4m, was found on board whilst berthed at Dover, United Kingdom. Seven of the passengers pleaded guilty and the eighth was convicted at trial.

On 22 February 2019, due to an unknown navigational error, MSC Orchestra collided with MSC Poesia as it was departing Buenos Aires, Argentina, and MSC Orchestra also hit a pier. Both ships only sustained minor damage and were cleared to depart.

== See also ==
- List of cruise ships
