= Port of Palma =

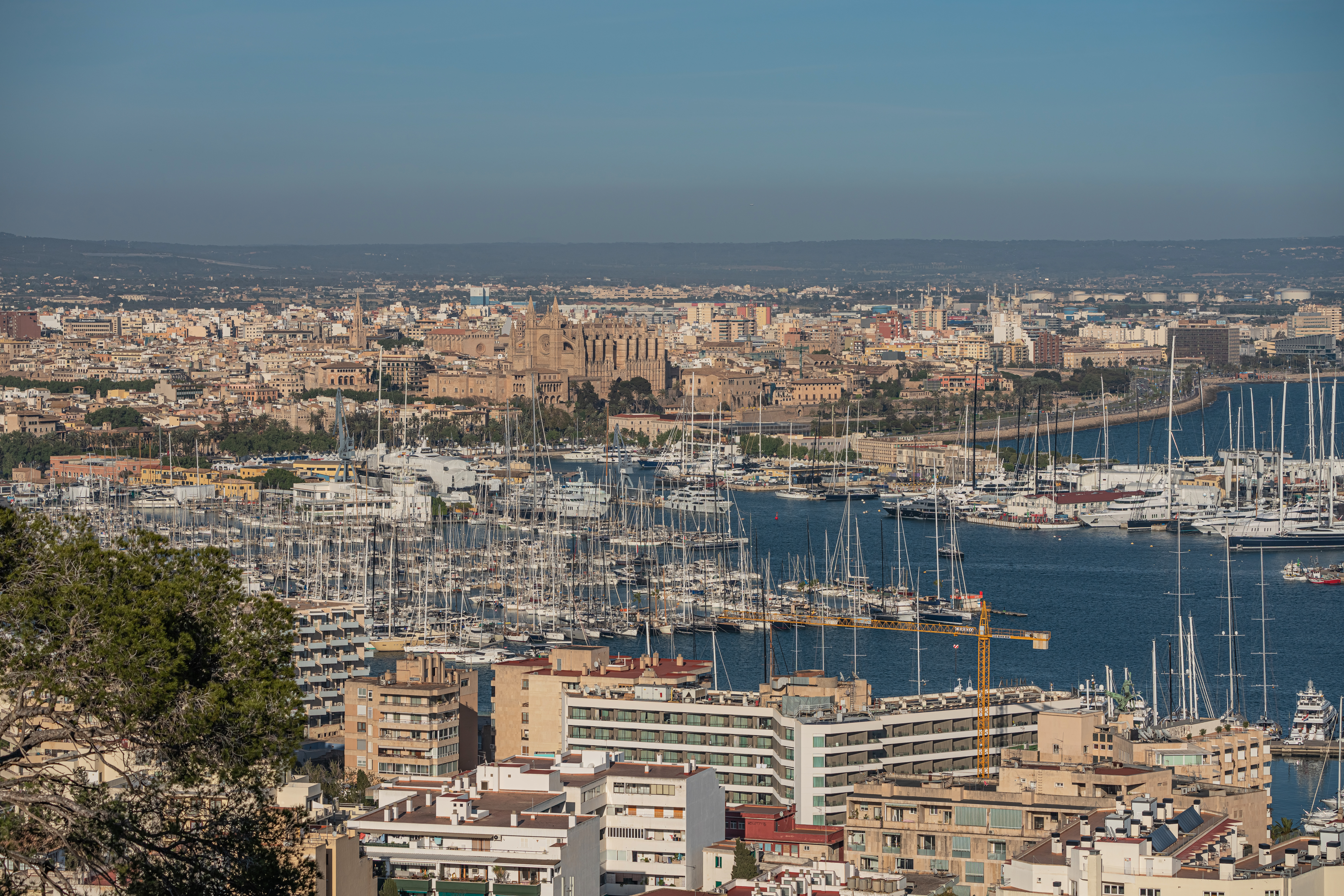
- Mallorca Palma from Bellver Castle viewpoint (2023)
- Interactive map of Port of Palma
- Location within Spain

Location
- Country: Spain
- Location: Catalonia
- Coordinates: 39°33′N 2°38′E
- UN/LOCODE: ESPMI

Details
- No. of berths: 33
- Draft depth: 12.0 metres (39.4 ft)

Statistics
- Website; Port of Palma

The Port of Palma is a port facility located on the southern outskirts of Palma de Mallorca, in Mallorca.

One of five ports in the Balearic Islands, it is the main port in Mallorca with both leisure, cruise and commercial facilities.
