= Iberojet =

Spanish holiday company

- Company type: Subsidiary
- Industry: Travel
- Founded: 1973
- Headquarters: Spain
- Parent: Avoris
- Website: iberojet.es

Iberojet is a Spanish holiday company and a constituent of Ávoris.

== History ==
Iberojet was founded in 1973 as a travel wholesaler, in 2015 the brand was acquired by Ávoris and is currently its online travel agency (OTA) for the distribution of its own product.

The company's key services were holidays within Spain, including the Balearic Islands and Canary Islands; the wider European continent and the Mediterranean, including major capitals and tourism circuits; the Caribbean, including the Dominican Republic, Mexico and Jamaica; North Africa, including Tunisia, Morocco and Egypt, and also Brazil in South America. Most notably, the company was the first to offer direct flights from Spain to destinations such as India, Jamaica, Corfu, Cyprus and Zanzibar. For a short period, the company also operated a fleet of cruise ships, a service that ended after the purchase of Ibero Cruises by Carnival Corporation & plc.

At present, Iberojet sells long-haul tours on the five continents, as well as circuits in Europe and the rest of the world. It also sells travel packages to the Caribbean (Dominican Republic, Cancun, Cuba and Jamaica) and Mauritius, Kenya and Zanzibar on direct flights with Evelop Airlines, Ávoris' airline.
