= MSC Opera =

Ship built in 2004

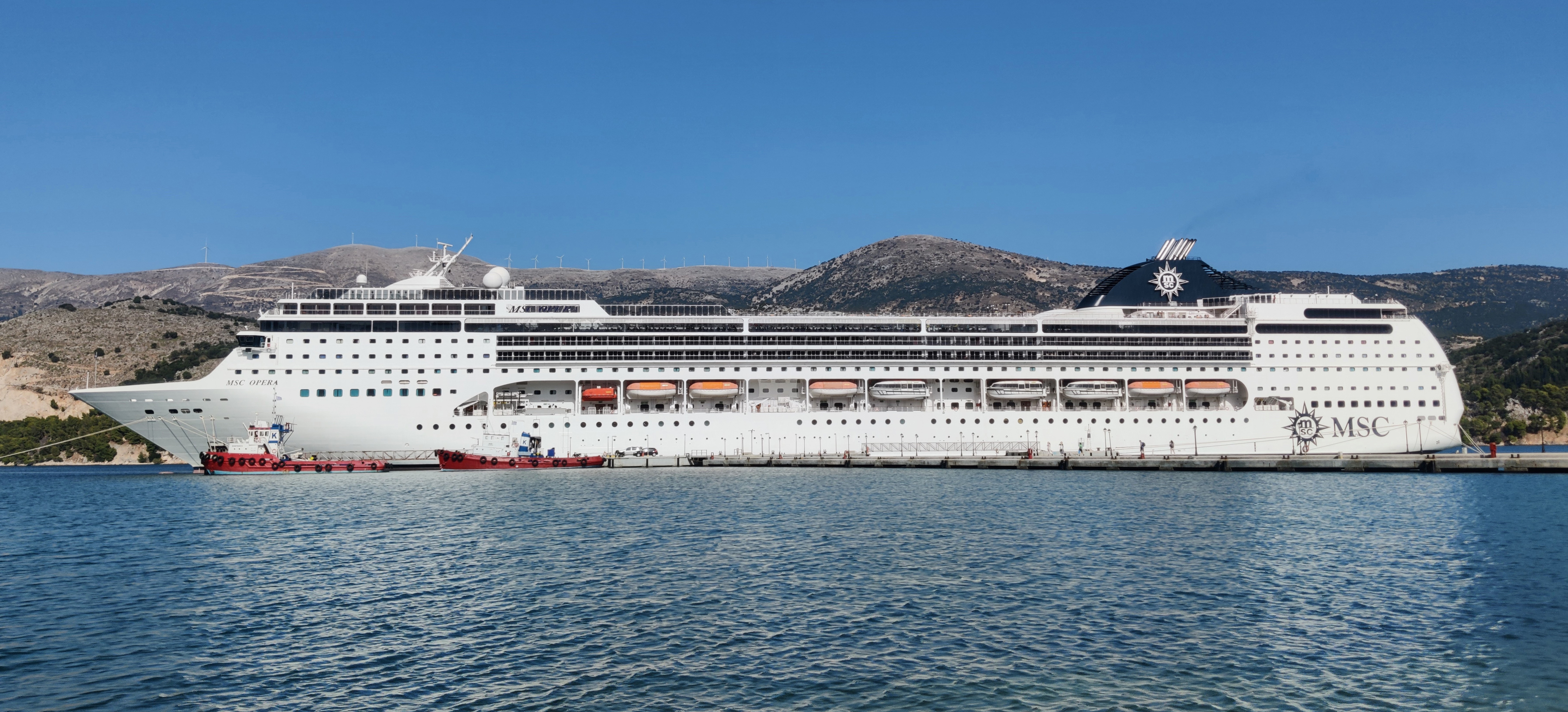
- MSC Opera in the port of Argostoli

History
- Name: MSC Opera
- Owner: MSC Cruises
- Operator: MSC Cruises
- Port of registry: Panama City, Panama
- Builder: Chantiers de l'Atlantique, St. Nazaire, France
- Launched: 11 September 2003
- Christened: June 26, 2004 by Sophia Loren in Genoa
- Maiden voyage: June 27, 2004
- Identification: Call sign: H3FV; IMO number: 9250464; MMSI no.: 357627000
- Status: In service

General characteristics
- Class & type: Lirica-class cruise ship
- Tonnage: 59,058 GT; 65,591 GT (after renovation)
- Length: 251.25 m (824.3 ft); 274.9 m (902 ft) (after renovation)
- Beam: 28.8 m (94 ft); 32 m (105 ft) (after renovation)
- Height: 54 m (177 ft)
- Draught: 6.8 m (22 ft 4 in)
- Depth: 6.6 m (22 ft)
- Decks: 9 (passengers accessible); 13 (total)
- Propulsion: 4 × Wärtsilä 12V38A; 30,600 kW (combined)
- Speed: 21.1 knots (39.1 km/h; 24.3 mph)
- Capacity: 2,150 (double occupancy); 2,679 passengers (maximum after renovation)
- Crew: 728

MSC Opera is a cruise ship built in 2004, carrying 2,679 passengers in 1,071 cabins, and with a crew complement of approximately 728, currently operated by Swiss company MSC Cruises. She served as the flagship of the company until MSC Musica entered service in 2006.

== Renaissance program ==
It was the third ship of the Lirica class to undergo renovation under the "Renaissance Program" and involved jumboisation to increase capacity, with the work being completed in the port of Palermo by Italian ship builders Fincantieri. New features included a spray park, refurbished shops, new child and teen areas, an enhanced buffet, a new lounge and an extended restaurant. The work was completed on 4 July 2015.

== Incidents ==
In May 2010, one week after a similar incident on board MSC Orchestra, UK Border Agency officers at Dover found a large quantity of cocaine concealed in four passenger cabins. Four Latvians and three Lithuanians were later convicted at Canterbury Crown Court and sentenced to a total of 84 years imprisonment.

On 14 May 2011, MSC Opera suffered engine failure in the Baltic Sea and was towed to the port of Nynäshamn, south of Stockholm, where passengers were transferred to smaller vessels. Around 1,700 passengers were flown home from Stockholm during the day. The ship was without power after the engine failure and internet reports stated that bathrooms were inoperable, causing some sanitation issues. Passengers were given a voucher to cover the cost of the cruise. On 17 May 2011, the ship departed Nynäshamn en route to Gdynia in Poland for repairs.

On 24 March 2019, the Portuguese police of Madeira arrested twelve people on board her (arriving at the port of Funchal in Madeira from the Caribbean), after finding 18 kilograms (40 lb) of cocaine hidden in bags of chips.

On 2 June 2019, the ship collided with the quay and a docked river cruise ship moored at the San Basilio Pier in the Giudecca Canal in Venice, Italy. The cause was later found to be technical difficulties with the engine and steering control systems while under tow. She sustained superficial scratches, while the smaller river vessel was more damaged. Five people were slightly injured.
