= MSC Musica =

Musica-class cruise ship

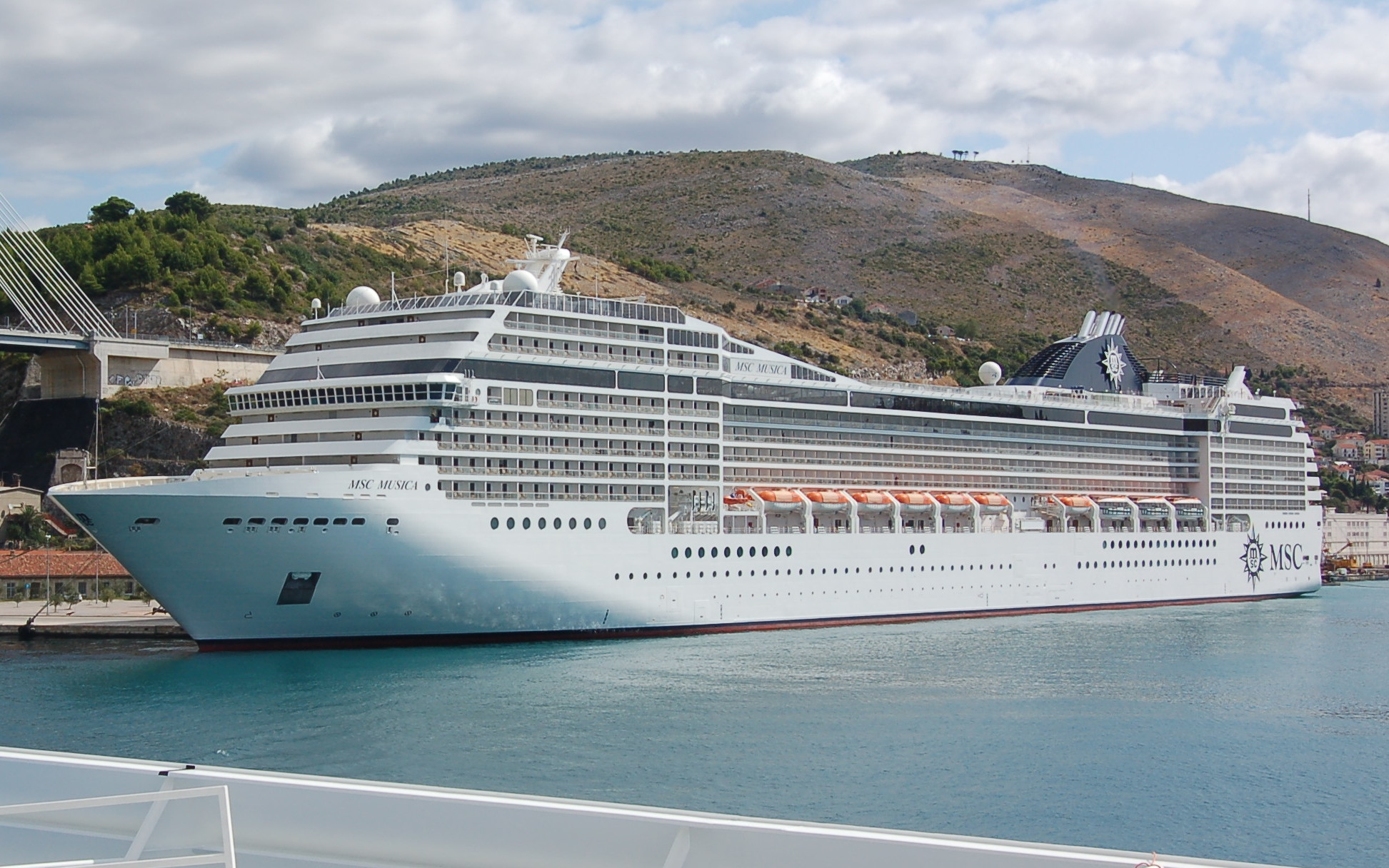
- MSC Musica at Dubrovnik

History
- Name: MSC Musica
- Owner: MSC Cruises
- Operator: MSC Cruises
- Port of registry: Panama City
- Builder: Chantiers de l'Atlantique
- Yard number: Q32
- Launched: 15 October 2005
- Completed: 2006
- In service: 2006
- Identification: Call sign: 3EFK6; IMO number: 9320087; MMSI number: 352003000
- Status: In service

General characteristics
- Class & type: Musica-class cruise ship
- Tonnage: 92,409 GT
- Length: 293.83 m (964 ft 0 in)
- Beam: 32.31 m (106 ft 0 in)
- Decks: 13
- Speed: 23 knots (43 km/h; 26 mph)
- Capacity: 2,550 passengers
- Crew: 987

MSC Musica is the first Musica-class cruise ship built in 2006 and operated by MSC Cruises. The vessel has 1,268 passenger cabins which can accommodate 2,550 passengers double occupancy, served by approximately 987 crew members.

== History ==
=== COVID-19 pandemic ===
On 9 April 2020, A Tribuna reported that a crew member of MSC Musica had tested positive for COVID-19. The crew member was initially admitted to hospital for emergency care due to anemia and had tested negative for the virus upon admission. However, when the crew member was scheduled for discharge, another test was performed, which returned positive. It is unclear if the virus was contracted aboard the ship or after disembarkation, but MSC Musica, which had been moored at the Port of Santos, was placed under quarantine as a preventative measure, with the standard 14 days of quarantine beginning on the day the crew member had disembarked.
