= MSC Armonia =

Cruise ship operated by MSC Cruises

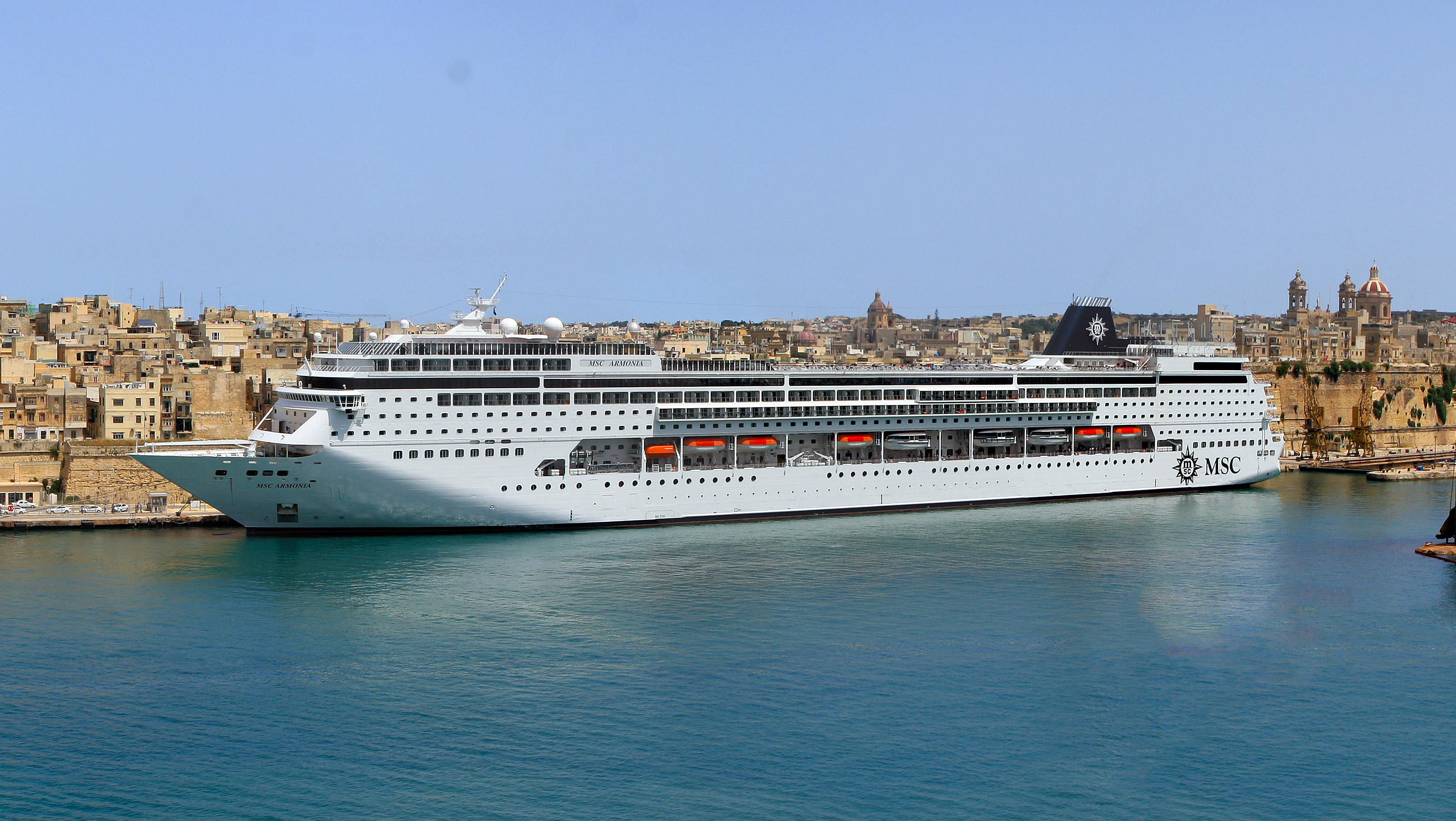
- MSC Armonia in Valletta, 2015

History

Panama
- Name: 2001–2004: European Vision; 2004 onwards: MSC Armonia
- Owner: 2001–2004: Festival Cruises; 2004 onwards: MSC Cruises
- Operator: 2001–2004: Festival Cruises; 2004 onwards: MSC Cruises
- Port of registry: 2001–2004: Genoa, Italy; 2004 onwards: Panama City, Panama
- Builder: Chantiers de l'Atlantique; St. Nazaire, France
- Yard number: V31
- Launched: 1 December 2000
- Christened: 22 June 2001
- Acquired: 22 June 2001
- In service: 1 July 2001
- Identification: IMO number: 9210141; MMSI number: 357281000; Callsign: H8EW
- Status: In service

General characteristics (as European Vision)
- Class & type: Lirica-class cruise ship
- Tonnage: 58,174 GT; 6,980 DWT
- Length: 251.25 m (824 ft 4 in)
- Beam: 28.8 m (94 ft 6 in)
- Height: 54 m (177 ft 2 in)
- Draught: 6.8 m (22 ft 4 in)
- Installed power: 4 × Wärtsilä 12V38; 31680 kW (combined)
- Speed: 20.8 knots (38.5 km/h; 23.9 mph)
- Capacity: 2,679 passengers

General characteristics (as MSC Armonia)
- Class & type: Lirica-class cruise ship
- Tonnage: 58,625 GT; 65,542 GT (after renovation)
- Length: 251.25 m (824.3 ft); 274.9 m (902 ft) (after renovation)
- Beam: 28.8 m (94 ft); 32 m (105 ft) (after renovation)
- Height: 54 m (177 ft)
- Draught: 6.8 m (22 ft 4 in)
- Depth: 6.6 m (22 ft)
- Decks: 9 (passenger accessible); 13 (total)
- Speed: 21.1 knots (39.1 km/h; 24.3 mph)
- Capacity: 1,554 passengers (lower berths); 2,087 passengers (all berths); 2,679 passengers (after renovation)
- Crew: 721
- Notes: Otherwise the same as European Vision

MSC Armonia is a Lirica-class cruise ship owned and operated by MSC Cruises. Originally built in 2001 for the now defunct Festival Cruises as MS European Vision, she has been operating for MSC Cruises since 2004. At 58,600 gross tons, she can accommodate 2,065 passengers in 783 cabins and 760 crew members.

== History ==
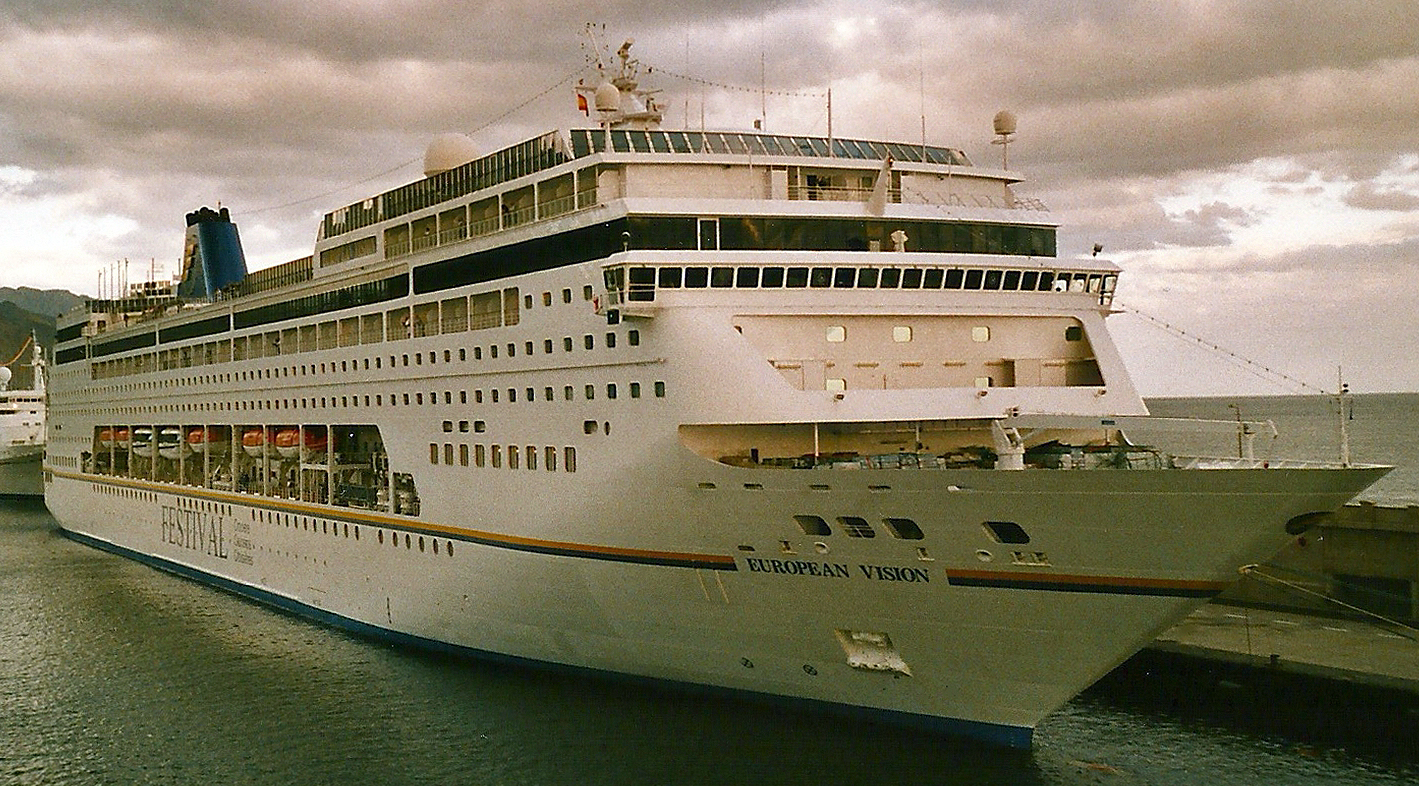
MSC Armonia as European Vision at Santa Cruz de Tenerife, 2003

=== As European Vision ===
As European Vision, she was chartered for the 27th G8 summit (20–22 July 2001) in Genoa, Italy as a secure location to house world leaders. Terrorism fears were high leading up to the 11 September attacks on the World Trade Centre. Al Qaeda was believed to be considering Genoa as a target. Although the ship was protected by a phalanx of anti-terrorism units including helicopters and missile launchers, U.S. President George W. Bush stayed at a dockside hotel instead.

=== As MSC Armonia ===
MSC Armonia has cruised around the Mediterranean Sea and the Eastern Atlantic. On 10 April 2018, MSC Armonia struck a dock at the port in Roatán. Damage to the ship was minor. After repairs were made to the ship, Honduran Port State Control authorities cleared the ship to continue her journey to Belize. No injuries to the passengers and crew on board were reported. The ship's homeport was in Havana until December 2018. She was re-located to Miami, offering cruises to Cuba and, later, to the Caribbean. In November 2020, she was moved to Tampa, Florida as homeport for the first time and sailed to the Caribbean.

==== COVID-19 pandemic ====
During the COVID-19 pandemic, the CDC reported as early as 22 April 2020, that at least one person who tested positive for SARS-CoV-2, was symptomatic while on board.

The COVID-19 pandemic forced fleet redeployments and MSC Armonia was moved to Miami and continued sailing from there through 2021.

On 15 December 2023, a passenger fell overboard and was never found.
