= MSC Divina =

Cruise ship

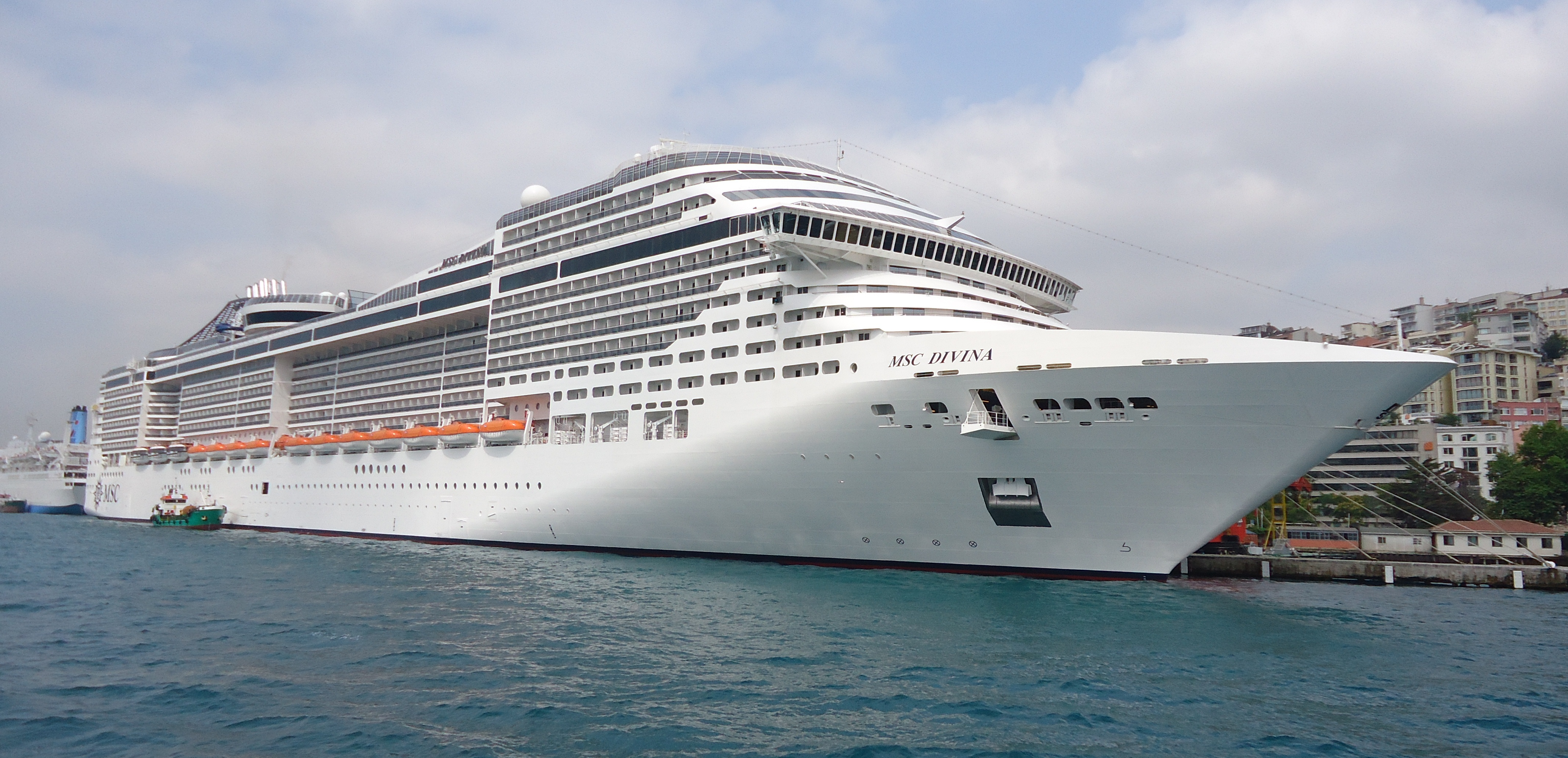
- MSC Divina in Istanbul, Turkey

History
- Name: MSC Divina
- Owner: MSC Cruises
- Operator: MSC Cruises
- Port of registry: Panama
- Route: Caribbean, Mediterranean
- Builder: Chantiers de l'Atlantique, Saint-Nazaire France
- Cost: $550 million
- Yard number: U32
- Launched: 3 September 2011
- Christened: 19 May 2012, by Sophia Loren
- Completed: 16 May 2012
- Maiden voyage: 27 May 2012, to 2 June 2012; to the Mediterranean
- In service: Operational
- Identification: Call sign: 3FFA5; IMO number: 9585285; MMSI number: 373178000

General characteristics
- Class & type: Fantasia-class cruise ship
- Tonnage: 139,072 GT
- Length: 333.33 m (1,093.60 ft)
- Beam: 124.41 ft (37.92 m)
- Height: 219.2 ft (66.81 m)
- Draft: 28.38 ft (8.65 m)
- Decks: 18 total, 13 passenger decks
- Installed power: Diesel (40,000kW)
- Propulsion: Twin propellers
- Speed: 23.7 knots (43.9 km/h; 27.3 mph)
- Capacity: 3,502 passengers; (405 inside cabins, 1,134 outside cabins)
- Crew: 1,388 crew
- Notes: 17 elevators, post-Panamax

MSC Divina is a cruise ship measured at 139,400 gross tonnage (GT) owned and operated by MSC Cruises. She was constructed from 2010 to 2012 being originally named MSC Fantastica while under construction. MSC renamed her when near complete in the shipyard to honour the actress Sophia Loren.

The MSC Divina is the third ship of the four Fantasia-class cruise ships, built after MSC Splendida and MSC Fantasia, and followed by her identical sister ship the MSC Preziosa. MSC Divina and MSC Preziosa are larger than the two previous ships in the class (which were of 137,936 tons each). She is the twelfth ship in MSC's fleet, and was the joint largest ship with MSC Preziosa at 139,400 tons, until the completion of the company's MSC Seaside (160,000 tons) and MSC Meraviglia (171,598 tons) in 2017. 3,502 passengers in 1,539 cabins are accommodated with a crew complement of 1,388. The MSC Divina entered service in May 2012, with her identical sister ship MSC Preziosa following in March 2013. MSC Divina cruises in the Caribbean and Mediterranean.

== Development ==
In July 2010, MSC Cruises announced the construction of a new Fantasia-class ship to be named MSC Divina. MSC Divina was largely based on the two previous ships in the class, however she was increased in size from 137,936 to 139,400 gross tonnage with 100 additional cabins and facilities and more efficient and energy saving mechanical and electrical systems. Passenger numbers increased to 3,502 with the crew complement increasing by 63 to 1,388. The vessel has a total of 1,539 passenger cabins. The main dimensions of the vessel have remained the same as the previous two ships, with the length being 333.33 meters, the moulded breadth of the hull 37.92 meters and the draught remaining the same at 8.45 meters.

Italian naval architects De Jorio Design International designed the ship and the interior areas with construction by STX Europe at Saint-Nazaire France. When near completion MSC Cruises announced that Fantastica would be renamed MSC Divina to honour the Italian actress Sophia Loren. Loren had mentioned to MSC Cruises president, Gianluigi Aponte, that she had wished to have a ship named after her. Aponte approved and renamed the MSC ship next into service after Loren.

== Launch ==
The ship was delivered to MSC Cruises on 19 May 2012 at Marseille in France, with her christening by Sophia Loren on 26 May 2012. The ship embarked on her maiden cruising voyage the next day.

The maiden voyage was met with protest when the ship entered Venice. Ms Loren received letters claiming that air pollution was created by the ship and the wake from her bow and vibrations created by her engines could damage historical buildings.

== Specifications ==
The ship is 333 m (1,092.52 ft) long, and carries up to 3,502 passengers with a crew complement of 1,388. She has 13 passenger decks, which contain 1,134 outside cabins and 405 inside cabins. Her speed is quoted at 23 knots (43 km/h; 26 mph).

Divina has electric propulsion motors and Rolls-Royce folding fin stabilizers to reduce the ship's roll.

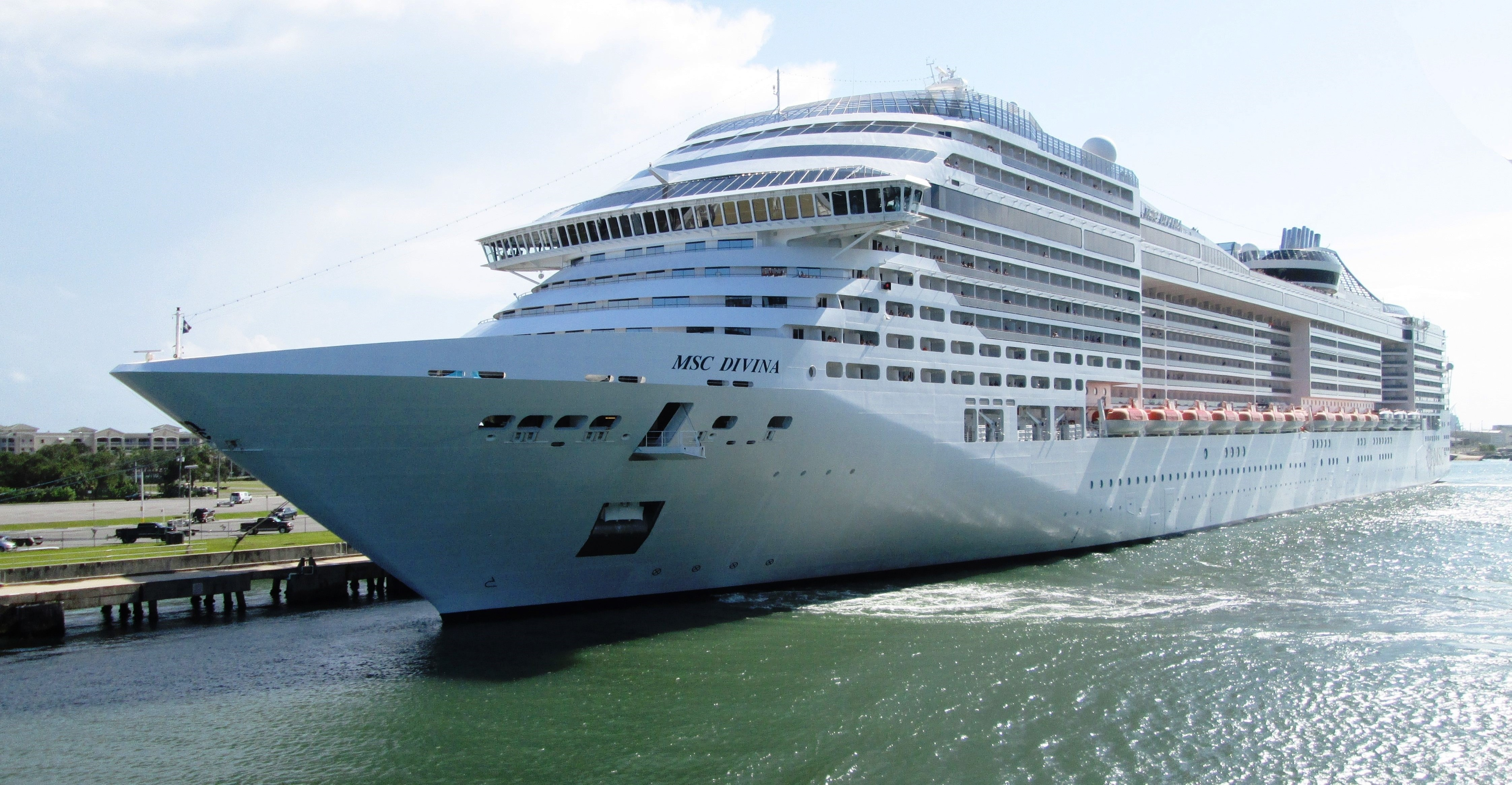
The MSC Divina at dock in Port Canaveral, Florida in 2016

The ship's drivetrain is the more efficient diesel/electric, powered by five Wärtsilä diesel engines. The engines produce low NOx emissions, using low-sulphur fuel. The engines turn alternators producing electricity. Propulsion is by two GE Energy Power Conversion electric motors with each giving 21,850 kW at 138 rpm. Redundancy is provided, with the two fully independent electric motors each turning a fixed propeller on conventional propeller shafts. The two propellers are fully independent ensuring propulsion if one fails. The same approach was applied to the two fully independent steering systems. Further advantage of using electric motors to turn the propellers is in small sunshine ports. Each propeller is controlled individually, and quickly, for ease of ship manoeuvrability along with the four bow thrusters. The need for tugs while in the many ports of call is greatly reduced. Two of the five engines have 16 cylinders each with an output of 16,800 kW, and the remaining three engines have 12 cylinders each producing 12,600 kW. Total power generated is 71,400 kW at 514 rpm.

A sea water distillation plant produces all the fresh water needed onboard using two evaporators and two reverse osmosis plants. The ship does not pump onboard water from shore water stations. The highly efficient evaporators are completely pollution free using a system of free heat recovery as the power source.

== Itineraries ==
From 27 May to 2 June 2012, the MSC Divina cruised in the Mediterranean calling at Civitavecchia in Rome; Messina in Sicily; and Valletta in Malta. The ship provided cruises in the Mediterranean calling at Italy, Greece, Turkey and Croatia. In November, she cruised in the eastern part of the Mediterranean, calling at Kotor, Montenegro; Marmaris, Turkey; and Valletta, Malta. She skipped Piraeus (Athens), in Greece, because of a strike, and also skipped Heraklion, in Greece, because of high winds. She then provided cruises with stops in Italy, Spain, Canary Islands, Portugal, and Morocco.

In late 2013, she repositioned to Miami, Florida, becoming the first MSC vessel in the fleet to serve the North American market, and provided cruises to the Caribbean year round. The ship hosted the Holy Ship! music festival from January 2014 until February 2016. Her year-round program ended in Spring 2019, and she now operates in the Caribbean seasonally.

== Incidents ==
On the afternoon of 18 June 2014, a Mexican passenger jumped into the sea, after drinking alcohol for two consecutive days. Moments after the "man overboard", the MSC Divina stopped, with the captain instructing a search for Amores. After several hours the search was abandoned being unsuccessful. MSC Divina resumed her route, with the search resumed by the Brazilian Maritime Authority. After failing to find the passenger the search was abandoned. The passenger was aboard MSC Divina after he won a contest organized on the occasion of the 2014 FIFA World Cup by a beer company. Throughout the passenger's journey aboard the MSC Divina and even shortly before he jumped, he had published his account on the social network Twitter, images and videos which stated the festive atmosphere that existed on board the vessel. Other passengers reported that the jump was to impress a young host and interviewer of Mexican television, who allegedly he had met on board MSC Divina and who also traveled to Brazil.

On March 22, 2017, at age 67, Sib Hashian of the band Boston died of a heart attack after collapsing in the middle of a set while performing on board the MSC Divina. Hashian had been diagnosed with kidney cancer just months before.

In late 2017, MSC Divina was featured in a photo exhibition by Gianni Berengo Gardin underlying the effects of cruise ships on the historical city of Venice.
