= MSC Seascape =

Cruise ship launched in 2021

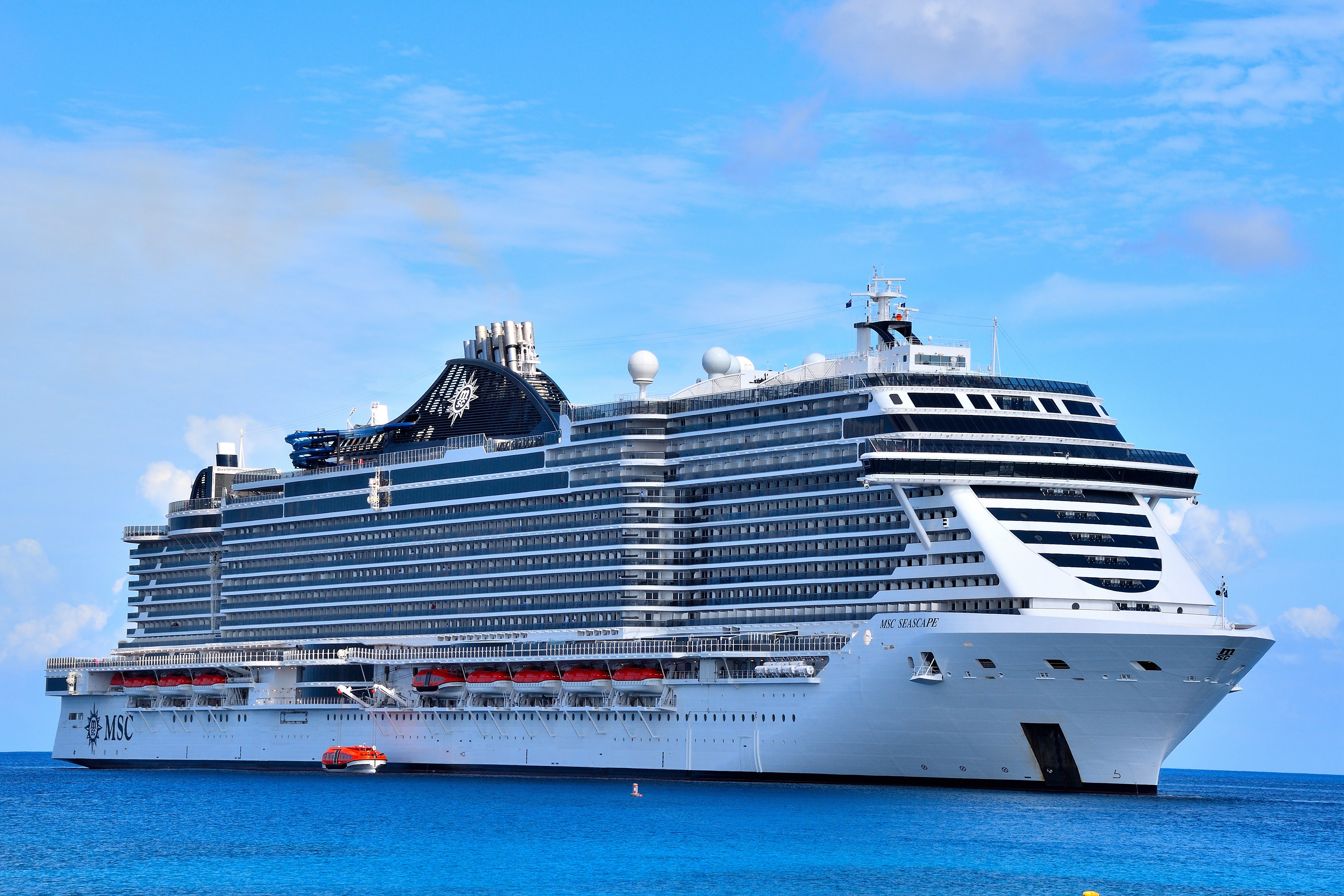
- MSC Seascape

History

Malta
- Name: MSC Seascape
- Owner: MSC Cruises
- Operator: MSC Cruises
- Port of registry: Valletta, Malta
- Ordered: 29 November 2017
- Builder: Fincantieri; Monfalcone, Italy
- Cost: €900 million
- Laid down: 19 September 2019
- Launched: 20 August 2021
- Sponsored by: Sophia Loren
- Christened: 7 December 2022
- Acquired: 16 November 2022
- In service: 2022–present
- Identification: Call sign: 9HA5370; IMO number: 9843792; MMSI number: 215920000
- Status: In service

General characteristics
- Class & type: Seaside EVO-class cruise ship
- Tonnage: 170,412 GT
- Length: 339 m (1,112 ft 2 in)
- Beam: 41 m (134 ft 6 in)
- Height: 74 m (242 ft 9 in)
- Draught: 8.55 m (28 ft 1 in)
- Decks: 20
- Installed power: Total Electric Power 65,040 kW (87,220 hp)
- Propulsion: 2 × 21,000 kW (28,000 hp) fixed-pitch propellers
- Speed: 21.8 knots (40.4 km/h; 25.1 mph)
- Capacity: 4,540 passengers (double occupancy); 5,877 passengers (total)

MSC Seascape is a Seaside EVO-class cruise ship built for MSC Cruises at the Fincantieri shipyard in Monfalcone, Italy. The leader of her sub-class is the MSC Seashore, delivered to MSC Cruises in July 2022. This class is a larger version of the main Seaside class of cruise ships.

== History ==
=== Planning and construction ===
On 29 November 2017, at the delivery ceremony of MSC Seaside, MSC announced it had signed an order with Italian shipbuilder Fincantieri worth €1.8 billion for two new cruise ships, scheduled for delivery in 2021 and 2023, respectively. The two ships would make up the Seaside EVO-class, described as a "further evolution of the Seaside-class prototype" established by MSC Seaside and MSC Seaview. The order for the first Seaside EVO ship replaced an order originally placed for a third Seaside-class vessel. MSC Seascape is described to be the largest and most technologically advanced ship ever built in Italy.

The MSC Seascape's naming ceremony was held on 7 December 2022 at the Manhattan Cruise Terminal.

MSC Seascape started her career with a repositioning cruise from the Mediterranean to North America. This maiden voyage started on November 18, 2022. After arriving in New York, she sailed down to Miami to begin her main career in the region on 11 December 2022.

On January 11, 2024, MSC made a announcement saying that MSC is moving the ship to Galveston, Texas. on Friday, November 7, 2025, she successfully went to Galveston and is now doing seven day caribbean cruises out of Cruise terminal 16.

== Design and specifications ==
MSC Seascape is 339 meters long (1.112 ft.) and has a beam of 41 meters (134 ft.), which makes it the longest ship in the fleet. She measures 74 meters high (242 ft.). MSC Seascape is 20 decks tall Her gross tonnage is 170,412 GT. The ship can do a maximum speed of 21.80 knots. However, cruising speed she does about 18.5 knots. She has a maximum passenger capacity of 5,877 passengers and 1,648 crew members.

== Citations ==
- "MSC Cuts Steel for 2021 Newbuild, Names it MSC Seashore". Cruise Industry News. 26 November 2018. Archived from the original on 26 November 2018.
