= MSC Preziosa =

Fantasia-class cruise ship

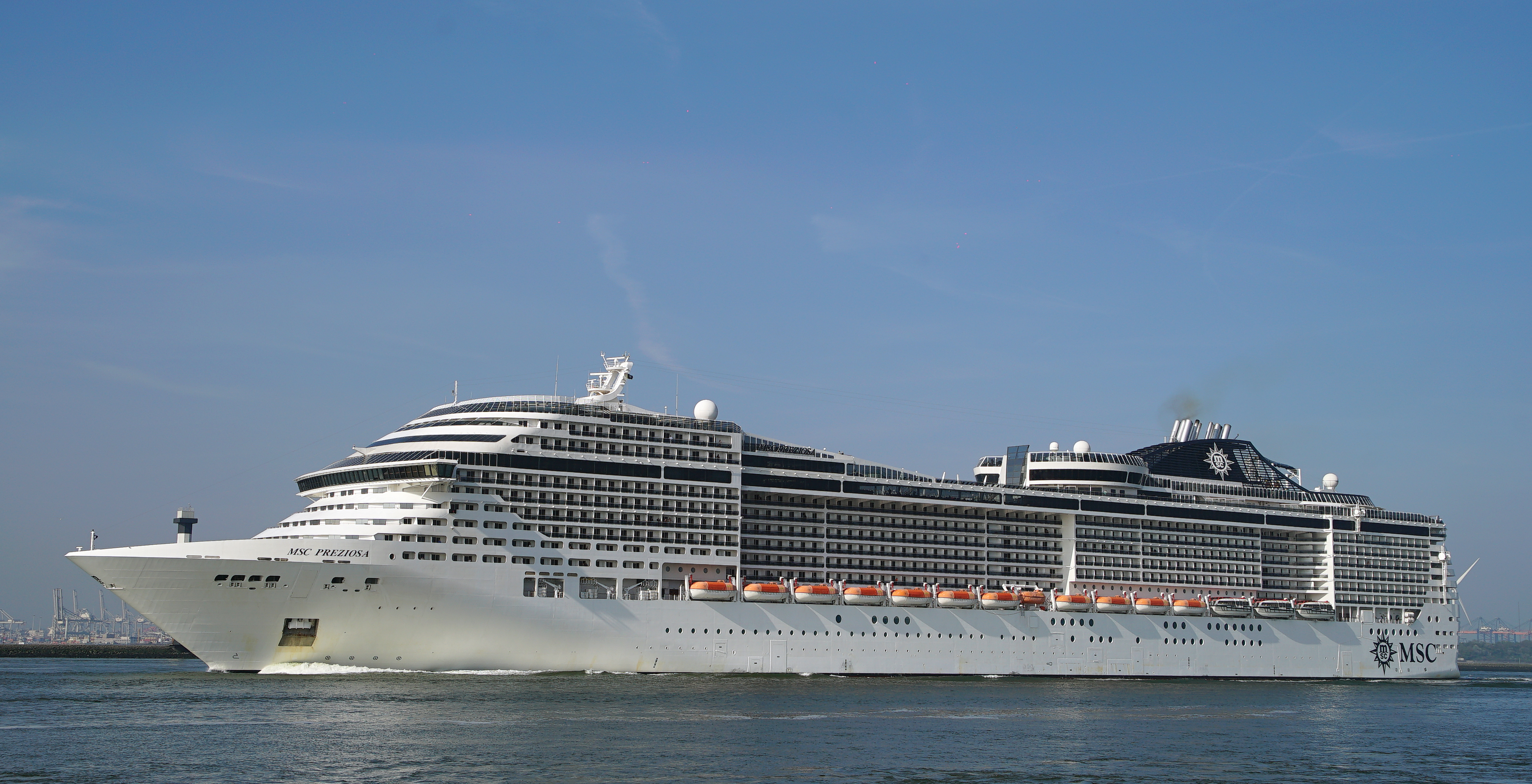
- MSC Preziosa near Hook of Holland, 2024

History

Panama
- Name: MSC Preziosa
- Owner: Mediterranean Shipping Company
- Operator: MSC Cruises
- Port of registry: Panama
- Builder: STX France
- Cost: $550 million
- Yard number: X32
- Launched: 2 September 2011
- Christened: 23 March 2013
- In service: March 2013
- Identification: Call sign: 3FOA6; IMO number: 9595321; MMSI number: 371861000
- Status: In service

General characteristics
- Class & type: Fantasia-class cruise ship
- Tonnage: 139,072 GT
- Length: 333.33 m (1,093.60 ft)
- Beam: 37.92 m (124.41 ft)
- Height: 66.81 m (219.2 ft)
- Draft: 8.65 m (28.38 ft)
- Decks: 18 total, 13 passenger decks
- Installed power: Diesel (40,000kW)
- Propulsion: Twin propellers
- Speed: 23.7 knots (43.9 km/h; 27.3 mph)
- Capacity: 3,959 passengers (double); 4,345 passengers (maximum)
- Crew: 1,370 crew
- Notes: 17 elevators, post-Panamax

MSC Preziosa is a Fantasia-class cruise ship owned and operated by MSC Cruises. She entered service in March 2013. She is an enhanced version of her first two class member ships, MSC Splendida and MSC Fantasia, and is identical to the previous MSC Divina. She debuted on 13 March as the fourth ship in the Fantasia class.

MSC Preziosa was constructed from 2010 to 2013 at the STX shipyard in St. Nazaire, France, and was delivered in March 2013, being named MSC Preziosa while under construction in 2012. She has a capacity of 3,502 passengers in 1,310 outside cabins and 327 inside cabins, who are accommodated with a crew complement of 1,370. She was the 13th cruise ship of the MSC Cruises line.

== Specifications and amenities ==
MSC Preziosa is 333 metres (1,092.52 ft) long, the moulded breadth of the hull being 37.92 metres (124 ft 5 in) and the draught at 8.45 metres (27 ft 9 in). She accommodates up to 3,502 passengers with a crew complement of 1,325. She has 13 passenger decks, which contain 1,310 outside cabins and 327 inside cabins. Her speed is quoted at 23 knots (43 km/h; 26 mph).

The ship has 14 passenger decks and 1,751 staterooms. 80% of the rooms have an ocean view, with 95% of the ocean view staterooms having a veranda. The cabins include balcony cabins, ocean view cabins, inside cabins, and cabins for people with disabilities. All rooms are furnished with a double bed with easy conversion into two single beds. Standard amenities include interactive television, mini-bar, safe, and air conditioning. Public facilities include seven restaurants, 20 bars and lounges, four swimming pools, a bowling alley, and a gymnasium. A spa is located on deck 14. The theatre accommodates 1,600 guests. The sports arena offers sports like basketball, volleyball, tennis, and a 235-meter jogging track. A Smurf-themed play area is located on deck 15 in a dedicated children's area. Preziosa and her identical sister ship Divina have more powerful and efficient electric propulsion motors, more efficient alternators and more advanced heating, ventilation & air conditioning controls, and chillers than their predecessors in the class. Rolls-Royce folding fin stabilizers were fitted to reduce roll while cruising.

The ship's drivetrain is the more efficient diesel/electric, powered by five Wärtsilä diesel engines. The engines produce low nitrous oxide emissions, using low-sulphur fuel. The engines turn alternators producing electricity. Propulsion is by two GE Energy Power Conversion electric motors with each giving 21,850 kW at 138 rpm. Redundancy is provided, with the two fully independent electric motors each turning a fixed propeller on a conventional propeller shaft. The two propellers are fully independent, ensuring propulsion if one fails. The same approach was applied to the two fully independent steering systems. A further advantage of using electric motors to turn the propellers is in small sunshine ports. Each propeller is controlled individually, and quickly, for ease of ship maneuverability along with the four bow thrusters. The need for tugs while in the many ports of call is greatly reduced. Two of the five engines have 16 cylinders each with an output of 16,800 kW and the remaining three engines have 12 cylinders each producing 12,600 kW. Total power generated is 71,400 kW at 514 rpm. Incinerators are used for burning waste. The ashes are stored onboard and removed when in port. The waste heat from the incineration is reclaimed. Solid waste is not discharged into the sea. An advanced wastewater treatment plant treats all solid waste. The hull is treated with an anti-fouling coating system preventing hull fouling reducing drag and improving fuel consumption. Energy savings from innovative technology was introduced significantly reducing greenhouse gas production. Energy-saving LED lighting is used throughout the ship. In the cabins, an average energy saving of 25% is achieved. A simple system automatically switches all energy-using devices off in the cabins, such as the main light, bathroom light, socket-outlets, and hair dryers whenever the cabin is empty. A Cabin Monitoring System regulates air conditioning in all cabins allowing guests to set their own cabin temperature. Centralized air-conditioning control is replaced with local cabin control significantly reducing energy waste. The control extends to when the balcony door is open or the cabin card is not in place the cooling system is switched off. A seawater distillation plant produces all the freshwater needed onboard using two evaporators and two reverse osmosis plants. The ship does not pump onboard water from shore water stations. The highly efficient evaporators are completely pollution-free using a system of free heat recovery as the power source.

== Service history ==
=== Construction ===
MSC Preziosa construction began in 2010 and was completed in March 2013. On 4 June 2010, a letter of intent was signed between STX France and Libyan state-owned company General National Maritime Transport Corporation (GNMTC), to build the Phoenicia, a cruise ship similar to MSC Fantasia and MSC Splendida. The Corporation ordered the ship at the behest of Hannibal Gaddafi, the fourth son of Muammar Gaddafi, to start a luxury cruising industry in the country. The original design was to include many of the facilities found on other Fantasia Class vessels, but the ship would also include a large aquarium tank containing six sharks. During construction, the Libyan Civil War broke out in February 2011, and in June 2011, STX France canceled the contract and began looking for a new buyer for the hull. On 13 March 2012, MSC announced it had reached an agreement to buy the ship for 550 million euros with specification to be identical to MSC Divina, naming the vessel Preziosa. A year later, the Preziosa was delivered to MSC Cruises. She was christened by her godmother, Sophia Loren, also godmother of the vessel's sister ship MSC Divina. She set sail on her maiden voyage from the western France port of Saint Nazaire. In March 2016, the company partnered with Technogym for a wellness program that included MSC Preziosa. As of February 2017, she was the first ship to be retrofitted with exhaust gas cleaning systems, alongside MSC Fantasia, and received an EU marine equipment directive certificate from Bureau Veritas after passing the MARPOL test. In April 2019, the dining area of the ship was enhanced, while in October, De Jorio Design added Italian interior designs to the ship. In February 2019, the ship was planned for deployment in the United Kingdom in 2021 for refurbishment.

=== Destinations ===
The pre-inaugural voyage started in St. Nazaire and ended in Genoa. She called in Lisbon (Portugal), Cadiz (Spain), Casablanca (Morocco), Valencia (Spain), and Marseille (France), before arriving in the port of Genoa on 22 March. Between winter 2013 and spring 2014, MSC Preziosa was operating on South America cruises from Santos. Its destination calls in March 2015 in Tunisia were cancelled due to the terrorist attack in Sousse. In April 2014, it navigated in the Canale della Giudecca, in Venice, Italy. Between March and October, MSC Preziosa was scheduled to operate on Mediterranean cruises from Genoa.

In March 2014, the police in Brazil arrested a crew member on the ship for smuggling cocaine. In January 2018, a 69-year-old Dutch passenger went missing after the ship's overboard detection failed, the passenger was not found despite the navy and helicopters searching for them.

In summer 2015, MSC Preziosa called on Marseille, Genoa, Civitavecchia (Italy), Palermo (Italy), Cagliari (Italy), previously Tunis, Palma (Spain) and Valencia. In spring 2017, MSC Preziosa cruised around the British Isles, visiting Invergordon (Scotland) in the Cromarty Firth on 9 May. It was the ship's first visit to Invergordon. In May 2018, it began sailing in Northern Europe with the MSC Orchestra. It started sailing around Trinidad during December 2018 for months during the cruise season.

On 6 March 2019, three passengers were hospitalized after a flight reserved for passengers on MSC Preziosa, which was traveling from Barbados. The Airbus A330 flight was carrying 448 passengers, and experienced an emergency following its eight-hour flight. Passengers and crew members had become ill, possibly with chest infections. In May 2019, the ship still continued to sail on Guadeloupe and Martinique. In summer 2019, MSC Preziosa cruised the Arctic and north Atlantic oceans. The 12-day voyage started in Hamburg, calling in various Norwegian ports including Spitsbergen in Svalbard. In January 2020, five thousand passengers arrived in Trinidad as the COVID-19 pandemic was discovered.

=== Coronavirus pandemic ===
On 1 May 2020, CrewCenter reported that two crew members aboard MSC Preziosa had tested positive for SARS-CoV-2. The first positive result had been announced to the crew on 30 April, and the second on 1 May. The positive results came as a surprise for many of the crew, as no one had boarded the ship since 23 March, and all crew members had been isolating themselves in guest cabins since 11 April, nearly three weeks prior. A small 25-cabin cruise yacht helped repatriate 19 crew members to Cuba. MSC Cruises announced the suspension of all North American itineraries until 30 June 2020, due to the COVID-19 pandemic.

== Incidents ==
Date	Incident	Description
30 December 2023	Overboard	A passenger went overboard and was not located after a search by two rescue boats and the Brazilian Coast Guard.
