= Seashore =

Seashore can be any of the following:

== Landform ==
- Coast
- Intertidal zone, between high and low water lines
- National seashore, a special designation in the United States
- Shore
- Beach

== Other ==
- Seashore (software), an open source image editor, based on GIMP written in Cocoa for Mac OS X
- Carl Seashore, psychologist
- Seashore (film), a 2015 Brazilian film
- "Seashore", a song by The Regrettes from the album Feel Your Feelings Fool!
- Seashore Trolley Museum, a Maine museum
- MSC Seashore is a Seaside EVO-class cruise ship built for MSC Cruises
