= General National Maritime Transport Company =

Libyan state-owned company

- Type: Libyan State Owned Company
- Industry: Ship Owners & Ship Managers
- Founded: 1975
- Headquarters: Tripoli, Libya
- Key people: Nageb Alhag Ahmed (Chairman)
- Products: Currently Transports Crude oil And Related Products
- Website: http://www.gnmtc.com

General National Maritime Transport Company, more commonly known as GNMTC, is a Libyan State Owned Company which was founded in 1975, with a total capital of 1.2 billion US Dollars. GNMTC is based in Tripoli, Libya, with subsidiaries in Malta and Hong Kong.

GNMTC trades world-wide through its present fleet of various types of vessels which includes Crude Oil Carriers, Product and Chemical Carriers, and LPG Carriers.

== Cruise ship ==
On June 4, 2010 a letter of intent was signed between STX France and GNMTC, to build one 140,000 Gross tonnage cruise ship similar to the existing MSC Cruises Fantasia class ships MSC Fantasia, and MSC Splendida. Nominally named Phoenicia she was specified by Hannibal Gaddafi, who had a 120-ton shark aquarium integrated into the design. During construction, the Libyan Civil War broke out on 15 February 2011. In June 2011, STX France cancelled the contract, and began looking for a new buyer of the hull. It was announced on March 13, 2012, that MSC had reached an agreement to buy the ship for 550 million euros, and be named MSC Preziosa.

== Current fleet ==
GNMTC Fleet

=== Suezmax ===
Ship	Built	Builder	Entered service for GNMTC	Deadweight	Flag
LIBYA	2007	Hyundai samho Heavy	2008–Present	149,950T	Libyan
AISHA	2008	Samsung Heavy Industries	2008–Present	160,391T	Libyan
BARBAROSA	2009	Hyundai samho Heavy	2009–Present	164,746T	Libyan
AL AGAILA	2009	Hyundai samho Heavy	2009–Present	164,787T	Libyan

=== Aframax ===
Ship	Built	Builder	Entered service for GNMTC	Deadweight	Flag
ADAFERA	2004	Sumitomo Heavy Industries	2006–Present	105215T	Libyan
ALHANI	2007	Samsung Heavy Industries	2009–Present	114858T	Libyan
ALJALAA	2007	Sasebo Heavy Industry	2009–Present	115577T	Libyan
ALYARMOUK	2008	Samsung Heavy Industries	2009–Present	105215T	Libyan
ASHAHDA	2004	Sumitomo Heavy Industries	2008–Present	105215T	Libyan
BADR	2008	Samsung Heavy Industries	2009–Present	112679T	Libyan
EBN BATUTA	2002	Hyundai samho Heavy	2008–Present	112679T	Libyan
INTISAR	2002	Hyundai samho Heavy	2008–Present	112679T	Libyan
EL GURDABIA	2002	Hyundai samho Heavy	2008–Present	112679T	Libyan
SAMRAA ALKHALEEJ	2006	Samsung Heavy Industries	2009–Present	114858T	Libyan
ALQADISIA	2008	Sasebo Heavy Industry	2009–Present	115000T	Libyan

=== Medium range tankers (MR) ===
Ship	Built	Builder	Entered service for GNMTC	Deadweight	Flag
CARTAGENA	2009	Hyundai Mipo Dockyard	2009–Present	46925T	Libyan
MAETIGA	2009	Hyundai Mipo Dockyard	2009–Present	46925T	Libyan

=== Handysize ===
Ship	Built	Builder	Entered service for GNMTC	Deadweight	Flag
ANWAAR AFRIQYA	2004	Dalian Shipyard-China	2008–Present	34647.7T	Libyan
ANWAAR LIBYA	2004	Dalian Shipyard-China	2008–Present	34647.7T	Libyan
ANWAAR AL KHALIJ	2005	STX Shipyard South Korea	2009–Present	28987T	Libyan
ANWAAR AL NASER	2006	STX Shipyard South Korea	2009–Present	28987T	Libyan

=== Small size ===
Ship	Built	Builder	Entered service for GNMTC	Deadweight	Flag
MASHHOUDA	1997	Daedong shipyard co, South Korea	1997–Present	8955T	Libyan

=== LPG ===
Ship	Built	Builder	Entered service for GNMTC	Deadweight	Flag
ATTAHADDI	1992	Kanrei-Japan	1992–Present	4392T	Libyan
TAZERBO	1996	Kanrei-Japan	1996–Present	3210T	Libyan

== Former Fleet List ==
Ship	Built	Type	Ship	Built	Type	Ship	Built	Type
Ebn Batuta	1977	General Cargo	Ebn Jubair	1977	General Cargo	Sirt	1981	General Cargo
Ebn Hwakel	1981	General Cargo	Elhashaishi	1982	General Cargo	Eldajazair	1987	General Cargo
Jaref	1987	General Cargo	Sabratha	1968	General Cargo	Ebn Majed	1973	General Cargo
Germa	1968	General Cargo	Ghat	1971	RO-RO Vessels	Derna	1974	RO-RO Vessel
Eltemsah	1970	RO-RO Vessel	Essidra	1976	Oil Tanker	Ezwetena	1976	Oil Tanker
Elbrega	1974	Oil Tanker	Ras Elanouf	1974	Oil Tanker	Um Elfroud	1968	Oil Tanker
Srier	1974	Oil Tanker	Marsa Elhrega	1976	Oil Tanker	Elgurdabia	1976	Oil Tanker
Elhani	1976	Oil Tanker	Elfwaihat	1975	Oil Tanker	Intisar	1974	Oil Tanker
Ain Tawerga	1977	Oil Tanker	Elrakwa	1977	Oil Tanker	Garnata	1972	Passenger
Toletela	1974	Passenger	Hanaa	1972	Passenger	Garyounis	1973	ROPAX
