= Fantasia-class cruise ship =

Class of cruise ships

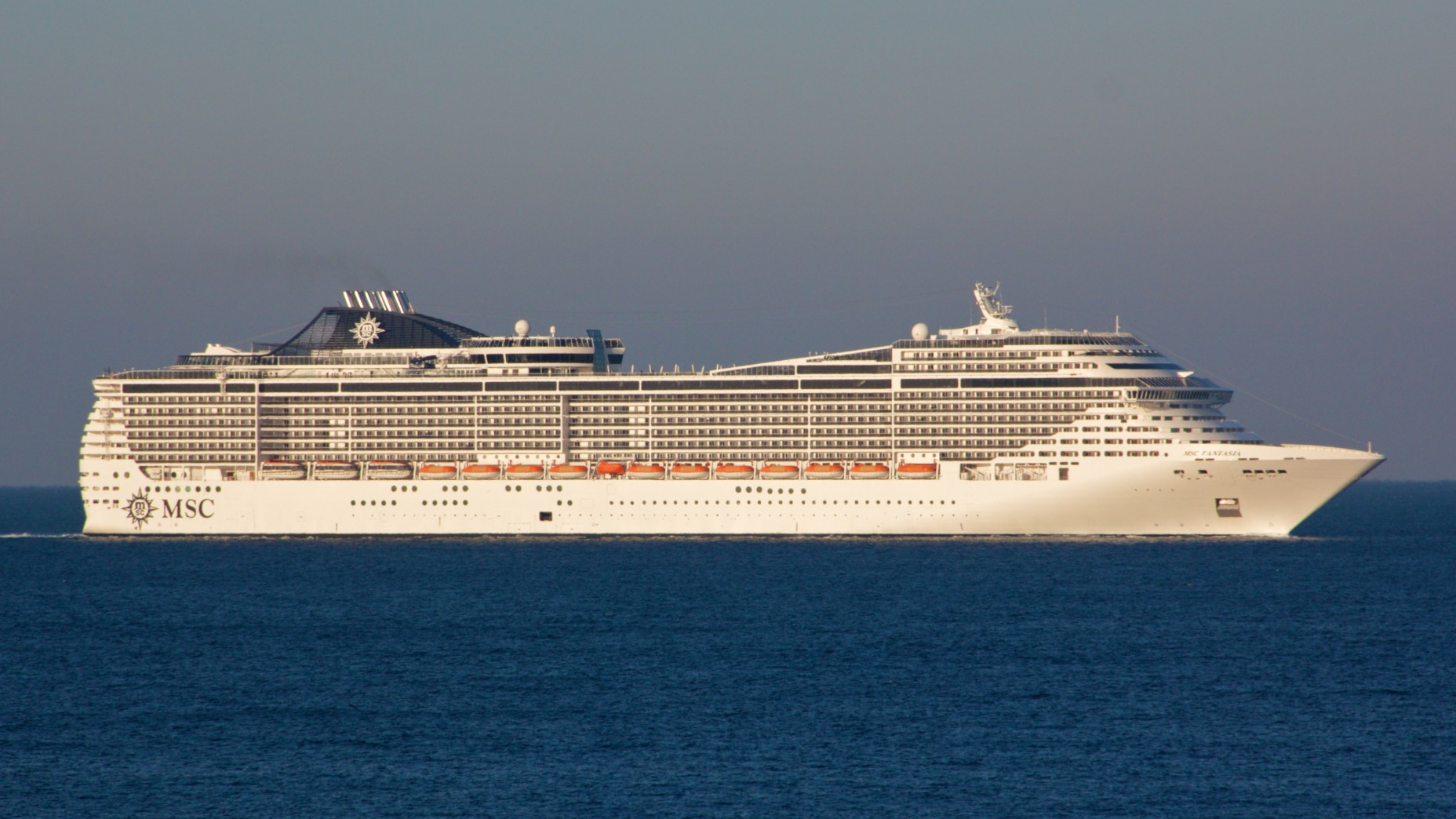
- The lead ship, MSC Fantasia

Class overview
- Name: Fantasia
- Builders: STX Europe in St. Nazaire
- Operators: MSC Cruises
- Preceded by: Musica class
- Succeeded by: Meraviglia class
- Cost: $ 550 million
- Built: 2008–2013
- In service: 2008–present
- Planned: 4
- Completed: 4
- Active: 4

General characteristics
- Type: Cruise ship
- Tonnage: MSC Fantasia & MSC Splendida: 137,936 GT; MSC Divina & MSC Preziosa: 139,072 GT
- Length: 333.30 m (1,093.50 ft)
- Beam: 37.89 m (124.31 ft)
- Height: 60 m (196.85 ft) waterline to highest deck
- Draught: 8.45 m (27.72 ft)
- Decks: 18 total, 15 passenger
- Installed power: 2 × diesel-electric at 40 MW (54,000 hp)
- Propulsion: 2 propellers at 20.2 MW (27,100 hp)
- Speed: 23 knots (43 km/h; 26 mph)
- Crew: 1,500 crew
- Notes: post-Panamax

The Fantasia class is a class of cruise ships, operated by MSC Cruises. At present, there are four active Fantasia-class cruise ships, the lead vessel, MSC Fantasia, MSC Splendida, MSC Divina and the MSC Preziosa, which were built by STX Europe in St. Nazaire. MSC Divina and MSC Preziosa are modified Fantasia-class ships. They have a 139,400 gross tonnage (GT) and have expanded amenities compared to their earlier sister ships.

The lead ship, MSC Fantasia, was completed in December 2008 and is the namesake of the class. The second ship, MSC Splendida, followed in March 2009. The third ship, MSC Divina entered service in May 2012 while the fourth and final ship, MSC Preziosa entered service in March 2013.

== Overview ==
At the time of their construction the Fantasia class were the largest ships in the fleet of MSC Cruises, and were preceded by the much smaller Musica class, which are at 93,300 tons. The ships are designed to complement the previous Musica class.

MSC Fantasia and MSC Splendida have a 1,500 m^{2} (16,000 ft^{2}) spa facility, four swimming pools, a Tex-Mex restaurant, a 1,700-seater showlounge, a mini golf course, a tennis/basketball court. They also have 1,637 passenger cabins.

MSC Divina and MSC Preziosa have 1,751 staterooms, 114 more than the previous ships. They also have two additional elevators and their decks and restaurants are redesigned to allocate more space per passenger.

=== Phoenicia/MSC Preziosa ===
On June 4, 2010 a letter of intent was signed between STX France and Libyan state-owned company General National Maritime Transport Corporation (GNMTC), to build one cruise ship similar to MSC Fantasia, and MSC Splendida. Nominally named Phoenicia she was specified by Hannibal Gaddafi, who had a 120-ton shark aquarium integrated into the design. During construction, the Libyan Civil War broke out on 15 February 2011. In June 2011, STX France cancelled the contract, and began looking for a new buyer of the hull. It was announced on March 13, 2012, that MSC reached an agreement to buy the ship for 550 million euros, and be named MSC Preziosa.

== Ships ==
Ship	Built	Builder	Entered service for MSC	Gross tonnage	Flag	Notes	Image
MSC Fantasia	2008	Aker Yards/STX Europe (St. Nazaire)	December 2008	137,936 tons	Panama		
MSC Splendida	2009	Aker Yards/STX Europe (St. Nazaire)	July 2009	137,936 tons	Panama	Ordered as MSC Serenata and renamed MSC Splendida in 2008.	
MSC Divina	2012	STX Europe (St. Nazaire)	June 2012	139,072 tons	Panama	Modified Fantasia class. Ordered as MSC Meraviglia and renamed MSC Divina in 2010.	
MSC Preziosa	2013	STX Europe (St. Nazaire)	March 2013	139,072 tons	Panama	Modified Fantasia class. Originally ordered for Libyan-based General National Maritime Transport.	

== Data ==
- Gross tonnage: 138,000-139,000-GT
- Length: 1,093 feet (333 meters)
- Beam: 124.6 feet (38.0 meters)
- Draught: 27.2 feet (8.3 meters)
- Cost: $550 million
