= MSC Seashore =

Cruise ship

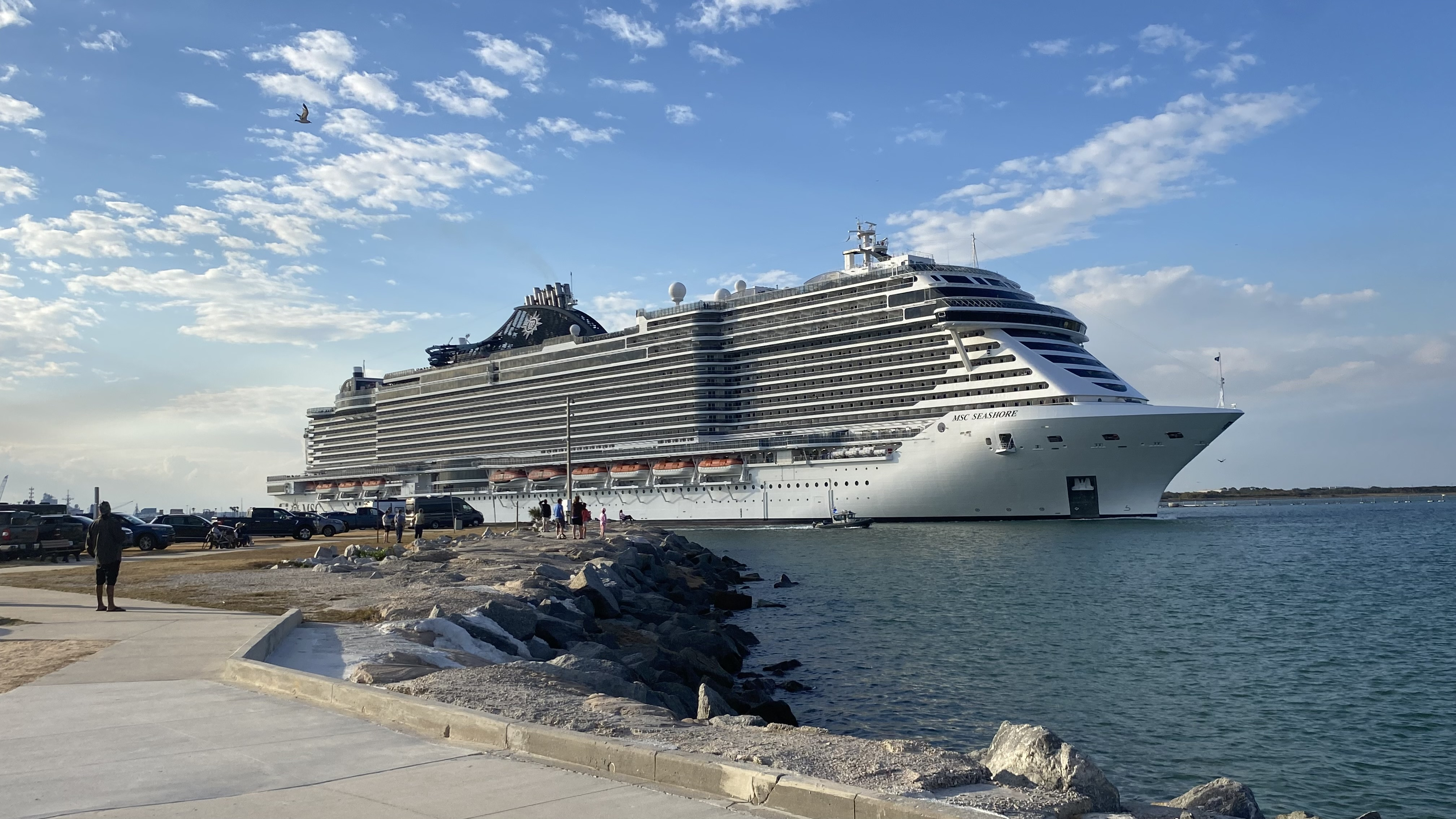
- MSC Seashore Departs Port Canaveral in Florida on 12 February 2026

History

Malta
- Name: MSC Seashore
- Owner: MSC Cruises
- Operator: MSC Cruises
- Port of registry: Valletta, Malta
- Ordered: 29 November 2017
- Builder: Fincantieri; Monfalcone, Italy
- Cost: €900 million
- Laid down: 19 September 2019
- Launched: 20 August 2020
- Sponsored by: Sophia Loren
- Christened: 18 November 2021
- Acquired: 26 July 2021
- In service: 2021–present
- Identification: Call sign: 9HA5370; IMO number: 9843792; MMSI number: 215920000
- Status: In service

General characteristics
- Class & type: Seaside EVO-class cruise ship
- Tonnage: 170,412 GT
- Length: 339 m (1,112 ft 2 in)
- Beam: 41 m (134 ft 6 in)
- Height: 76 m (249 ft 4 in)
- Draught: 8.55 m (28 ft 1 in)
- Decks: 20
- Installed power: Total Electric Power 65,040 kW (87,220 hp)
- Propulsion: 2 × 21,000 kW (28,000 hp) fixed-pitch propellers
- Speed: 21.8 knots (40.4 km/h; 25.1 mph)
- Capacity: 4,540 passengers (double occupancy); 5,632 passengers (total)

MSC Seashore is a Seaside EVO-class cruise ship built for MSC Cruises at the Fincantieri shipyard in Monfalcone, Italy. As of August 2021, she became the lead ship of MSC's Seaside EVO class, a sub-class of the Seaside-class of ships built with larger dimensions. She was joined by sister ship MSC Seascape, since delivery in November 2022.

== History ==
=== Planning and construction ===
On 29 November 2017, at the delivery ceremony of MSC Seaside, MSC announced it had signed an order with Italian shipbuilder Fincantieri worth €1.8 billion for two new cruise ships, scheduled for delivery in 2021 and 2023, respectively. The two ships make up the Seaside EVO-class, described as a "further evolution of the Seaside-class prototype" established by MSC Seaside and MSC Seaview. The order for the first Seaside EVO ship replaced an order originally placed for a third Seaside-class vessel. The first Seaside EVO ship would become the largest ship to have been built in Italy.

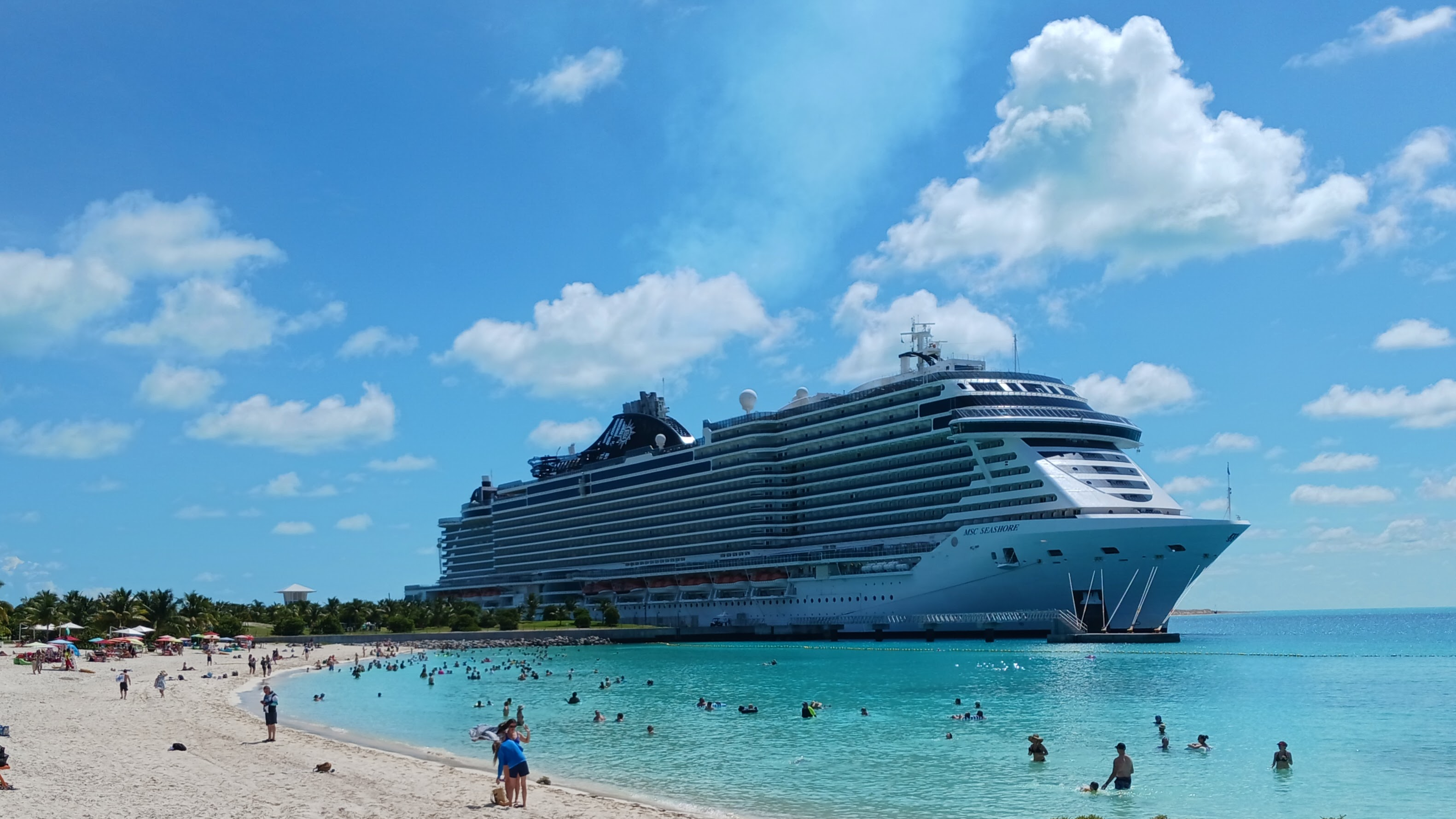
MSC Seashore docked in Ocean Cay, Bahamas on 23 September 2024

On 26 November 2018, MSC revealed the name of the first Seaside EVO ship as MSC Seashore, the same day it held the steel-cutting ceremony for the ship at Fincantieri's shipyard in Monfalcone. On 19 September 2019, the keel laying ceremony was performed for the ship, in which two coins were placed under the ship's keel for good fortune. She was floated out on 20 August 2020 and moved to a wet dock to complete her outfitting work. MSC Seashore was delivered in July 2021.

On 22 December 2021, a 15-year-old died after falling from a balcony on the ship. The cruise line reported that it appeared to have been a suicide.

== Operational career ==
Originally set to begin operations with her maiden voyage on 13 June 2021, MSC Seashore was scheduled to sail weekly Western Mediterranean cruises, visiting Barcelona, Marseille, Genoa, Naples, Messina, and Valletta. However, after the COVID-19 pandemic caused construction delays at the shipyard, her debut was postponed to 1 August 2021, forcing MSC to deploy MSC Fantasia on her route until her debut.

== Design and specifications ==
MSC claims MSC Seashore's changes in her overall design from her older Seaside-class sister ships make up more than 65 percent of the vessel. She is larger than her sister ships: her height measures 74 metres (243 ft), her beam measures 41 metres (135 ft), and her length measures 339 metres (1,112 ft), an addition of 16 metres (52 ft). She also measures 170,412 GT, an increase from 153,516 GT, and includes 10,000 square meters of additional deck space, giving her the highest ratio of outdoor space per guest of any MSC ship upon her debut. On board, she has expanded guest capacity resulting from 200 additional passenger cabins, with 4,540 passengers at double occupancy or 5,877 passengers at maximum capacity, 758 more than that on Seaside-class ships. The larger deck plan includes additional restaurants and lounge space, but fewer whirlpools. The ship has features designed to enhance efficiency, such as a selective catalytic reduction system to control the ship's emissions and anti-fouling paint to reduce wave resistance on the ship's hull. The MSC Seashore is the first new cruise ship to feature advanced air sanitation technology. According to MSC, the 'Safe Air' system reduces the risk of catching viruses.
