= World-class cruise ship =

Class of cruise ships under construction for MSC Cruises

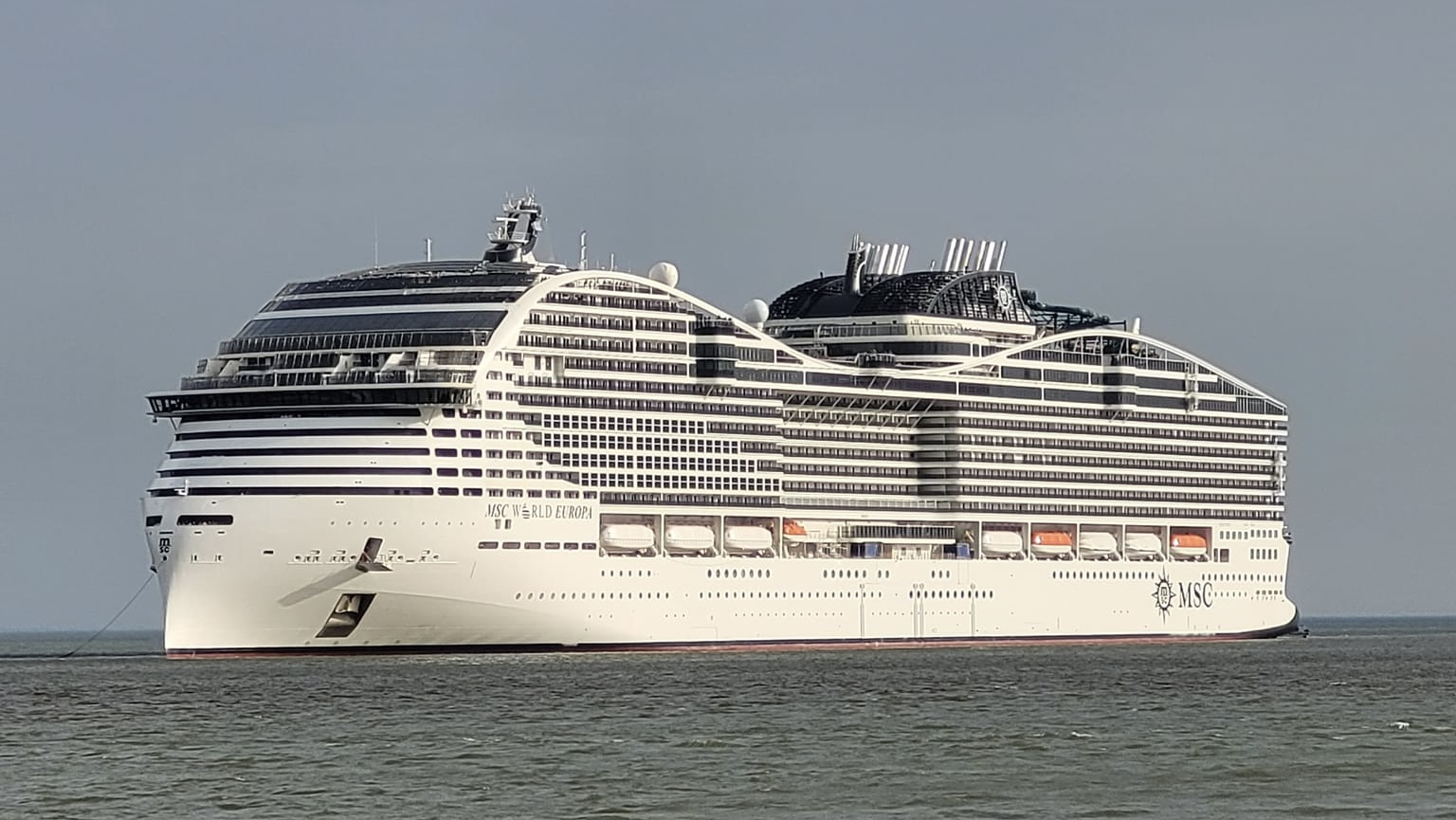
- MSC World Europa in Saint-Nazaire, France on June 2022

Class overview
- Builders: Chantiers de l'Atlantique; Saint-Nazaire, France
- Operators: MSC Cruises
- Preceded by: Seaside class
- Built: 2019–2030 (planned)
- Planned: 8
- Building: 2
- Completed: 2
- Active: 2

General characteristics
- Type: Cruise ship
- Tonnage: 215,863–216,638 GT
- Length: 333.3 m (1,093.5 ft)
- Beam: 47.0 m (154.3 ft)
- Height: 68.0 m (223 ft)
- Decks: 22
- Propulsion: (MSC World Europa/MSC World America) 2 x five-bladed propellers and 7 thrusters being 4 x bow and 3 stern, (MSC World Asia/MSC World Atlantic) 2 x ABB Azipods XO and 4 x bow thrusters
- Speed: 22.7 knots (42.0 km/h; 26.1 mph)
- Capacity: 6,762 passengers
- Crew: 2,138

World Class ships are a class of cruise ships being built by Chantiers de l'Atlantique of France for MSC Cruises. The lead vessel, MSC World Europa, was delivered in October 2022 and the second, MSC World America, in March 2025. Six more ships in this class are planned for delivery between 2026 and 2031.

== History ==
=== Planning ===
In April 2016, MSC Cruises unveiled a new class of cruise ships that it calls the World class after it signed a letter of intent for up to four World-class vessels from STX France, an order worth approximately €4.5 billion, at Élysée Palace. The announcement came after MSC revealed it had already finalized the order for two of the ships. The World-class design would become the third new prototype ordered by MSC in recent years, following its commitments to the Meraviglia and Seaside classes. Details also initially revealed that each ship in the class was estimated to measure approximately over 200,000 gross tonnage (GT) and house over 2,700 cabins for a guest capacity of around 5,400 passengers, making the World-class ships part of the second largest class of cruise ships in the world. MSC also announced all ships in the class would be powered by liquefied natural gas (LNG). With the Float Out from the MSC World Asia and the keel laying of the MSC World Atlantic MSC Cruises announced that they will build two more World Class ships expected before 2032.

=== Timeline ===
The ships were originally expected to be delivered in 2022, 2024, 2025, and 2026, respectively. The contract for the final two ships, now set to be delivered in 2025 and 2027, respectively, was signed in January 2020.

On 31 October 2019, MSC announced the name of the first World-class ship as MSC Europa and held the ship's steel-cutting ceremony at Chantiers de l'Atlantique, inaugurating the construction for the ship. The ship was later revealed to be renamed MSC World Europa, announced during her keel-laying ceremony on 29 June 2020.

== Design and specifications ==
In May 2017, at the delivery ceremony of MSC Meraviglia held at the STX France shipyard in Saint-Nazaire, France, MSC Cruises released new details and renderings of the class of ships. In the announcement, MSC revealed that each of the four ships it had ordered would hold a guest capacity of 6,850 passengers across 2,760 passenger cabins, more than any cruise ship. Each ship would measure 330 metres (1,082 ft 8 in) long and 47 metres (154 ft 2 in) wide and integrate a "Y"-shape hull design for expansive views and a "G"-shape bow design for fuel efficiency and stability. Initial features announced included square cabins, a glass pool lounge, and sections designed specifically for families. The aft of the ships would also be open, with the lower promenade deck flanked by balcony cabin towers. MSC World Europa eventually had a gross tonnage of 215,863.

As all ships are designed to be powered by LNG, this reportedly could achieve a 99% decrease in sulfur dioxide emissions, an 85% decrease in nitric oxide emissions, and a 20% decrease in carbon dioxide emissions, when compared with non-LNG-powered ships. MSC World Europa is also the world's first ship to implement an LNG-powered fuel cell. The 50-kilowatt fuel cell demonstrator aboard the ship incorporates solid oxide fuel cell (SOFC) technology and uses LNG to produce onboard electricity and heat, reportedly further reducing greenhouse gas emissions by 30% compared with conventional LNG engines.

== Ships ==
Ship	Delivery	Gross tonnage	Flag	IMO number	Building number	Notes	Image
MSC World Europa	24 October 2022	215,863	Malta	9837420	W34	First ship in the class.	
MSC World America	27 March 2025	216,638	Malta	9837432	X34	Second ship in the class. Originally planned for spring 2024. Construction started on 24 October 2022. Floating hull section built at CRIST, Gdynia. Sea trials started on 12 December in Saint Nazaire (ATD 2024-12-12 14:09 (UTC+1)) based in Miami Floated out in August 2024.	
MSC World Asia	December 2026	216,636	Malta		Y34	Floated out. The first MSC World class ship equipped with azimuthing podded propulsion (ABB Azipod XO).	
MSC World Atlantic	2027 (planned)	215,700	Malta		Z34	under construction	
MSC World Class 5	2029 (planned)	215,700	Malta		E36	ordered	
MSC World Class 6	2030 (planned)	215,700	Malta		F36	ordered	
MSC World Class 7	2030 (planned)	215,700	Malta		K36	ordered	
MSC World Class 8	2031 (planned)	215,700	Malta		L36	ordered	
