= MSC World Europa =

Cruise ship operating for MSC Cruises since 2022

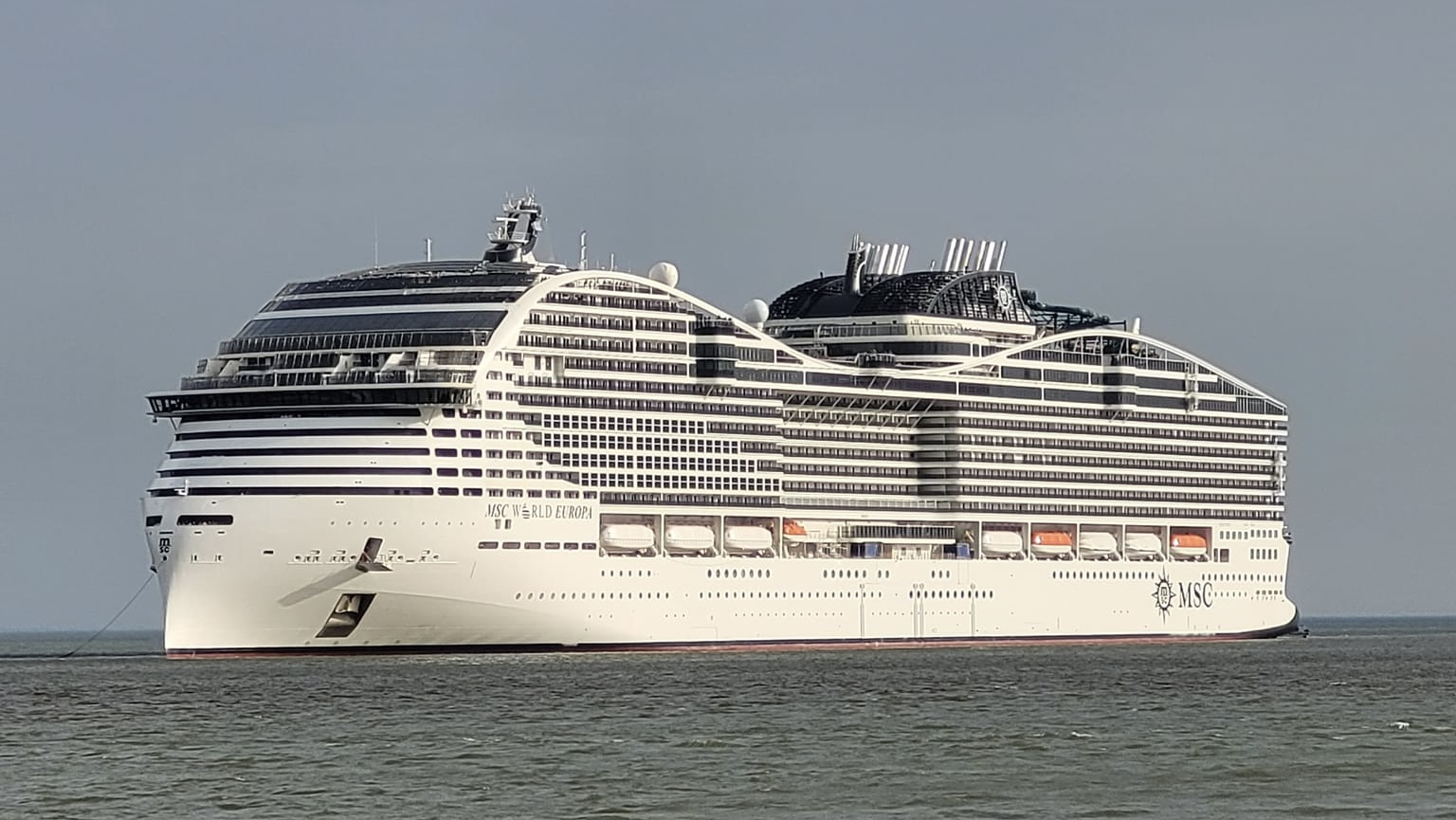
- MSC World Europa

History
- Name: MSC World Europa
- Owner: Mediterranean Shipping Company
- Operator: MSC Cruises
- Port of registry: Valletta, Malta
- Builder: Chantiers de l'Atlantique; (Saint-Nazaire, France)
- Cost: €1.125 billion
- Laid down: 29 June 2020
- Launched: 2 December 2021
- Acquired: 24 October 2022
- Maiden voyage: 20 December 2022
- In service: 2022-present
- Identification: Call sign: 9HA5682; IMO number: 9837420; MMSI number: 256070000
- Status: in service
- Notes: construction paid

General characteristics
- Class & type: World-class cruise ship
- Tonnage: 215,863 GT
- Length: 333.3 m (1,093 ft 6 in)
- Beam: 47 m (154 ft 2 in)
- Height: 68 m (223 ft 1 in)
- Decks: 22
- Propulsion: 2 five blade propellers and 7 thrusters (4 bow and 3 stern)
- Speed: 22.7 knots (42.0 km/h; 26.1 mph)
- Capacity: 6,762 passengers
- Crew: 2,138
- Notes: Largest ship built for MSC Cruises. Powered by LNG-fueled cruise ship and solid oxide fuel cell (SOFC)

MSC World Europa is a World-class cruise ship of MSC Cruises. LNG-powered, she was built by the Chantiers de l'Atlantique shipyard in Saint-Nazaire, France, and as of June 2024 is the world's eighth largest passenger ship and the largest cruise ship in the world that is not owned by Royal Caribbean International currently. MSC World Europa began public operations from 20 December 2022 in a 9-day roundtrip from Qatar after serving as a hotel ship in Doha during the 2022 FIFA World Cup. She became MSC's first World-class ship and will be joined by three sister ships in 2025, 2026, and 2027, respectively.

== History ==
=== Planning ===
In April 2016, MSC Cruises unveiled its newest class of cruise ships, the World class, after it signed a letter of intent for up to four World-class vessels from STX France, an order worth approximately €4 billion, at Élysée Palace. Each ship in the class is estimated to measure approximately over 200,000 gross tonnage (GT) and house over 2,700 cabins for a guest capacity of around 5,400 passengers, which will make the World class the third largest class of cruise ships in the world. MSC also announced all ships in the class would be powered by liquefied natural gas (LNG).

=== Construction ===
On 31 October 2019, MSC revealed the name of the first World-class ship as MSC Europa and held the ship's steel-cutting ceremony at Chantiers de l'Atlantique, inaugurating the construction for the new ship. On 29 June 2020, MSC held the keel-laying ceremony for the ship renamed as MSC World Europa, in which two coins were placed under the keel for good luck. In June 2021 she was relocated in a drydock towards the sea.

MSC World Europa was floated out in December 2021, and completed her first sea trials using LNG in the Atlantic during June 2022.

The ship was delivered on 24 October 2022. The construction of her sister ship MSC World America started on the same day.

=== Operational career ===
In November 2019, Qatar signed an agreement with MSC to charter MSC World Europa and MSC Poesia as accommodations vessels for fans attending the 2022 FIFA World Cup, with the ships berthed at Doha Port during the games. It now commonly operates around western Europe going through Italy, France, Malta, and Spain on a 10-day round trip.

== Design and specifications ==
In May 2017, at the delivery ceremony of MSC Meraviglia held at STX France, MSC released new details and renderings of the World class of ships. In the announcement, MSC revealed that each of the four ships it had ordered would hold a guest capacity of 6,850 passengers across 2,760 passenger cabins. Each ship would measure 1,083 feet (330 m) long and 154 feet (47 m) wide and integrate a "Y"-shape hull design for expansive views and a "G"-shape bow design for fuel efficiency and stability. Initial features announced included square cabins, a glass pool lounge, and sections designed specifically for families. The aft of the ships would also be open, with the lower promenade deck flanked by balcony cabin towers. MSC World Europa has a gross tonnage of 215,863.

As MSC World Europa is powered by LNG, it would reportedly allow her to sail with a 99% decrease in sulfur dioxide emissions, an 85% decrease in nitric oxide emissions, and a 20% decrease in carbon dioxide emissions, when compared with non-LNG-powered ships. She will also become the world's first ship to implement an LNG-powered fuel cell. The 50-kilowatt fuel cell demonstrator aboard the ship will incorporate solid oxide fuel cell (SOFC) technology and use LNG to produce onboard electricity and heat and reportedly further reduce greenhouse gas emissions by 30% when compared with ships powered by conventional LNG engines.
