= Seaside-class cruise ship =

Ship class

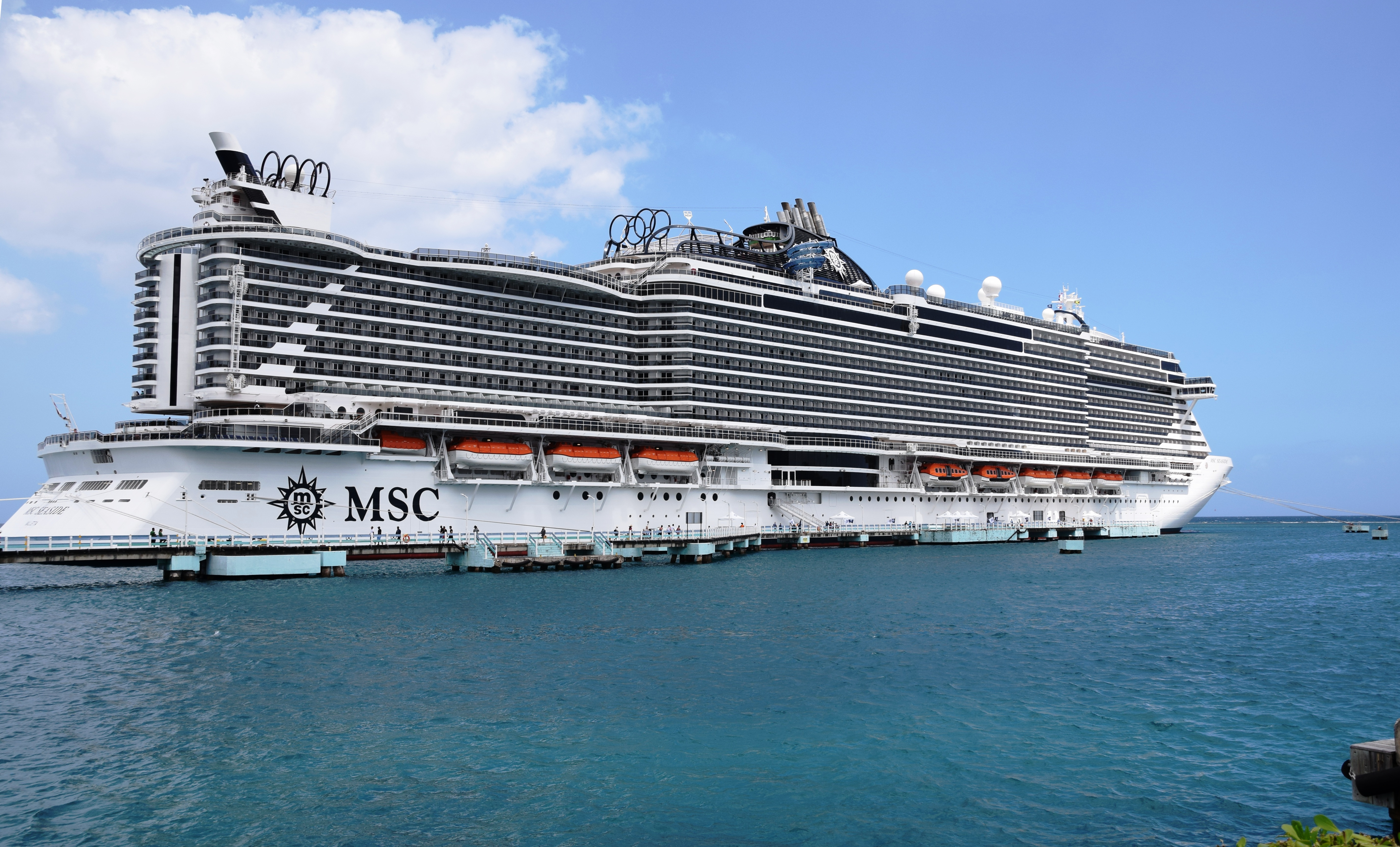
- MSC Seaside, the lead vessel in the Seaside class

Class overview
- Builders: Fincantieri, Monfalcone
- Operators: MSC Cruises
- Preceded by: Meraviglia class
- Succeeded by: World class
- Subclasses: Seaside EVO subclass
- Planned: 4
- Completed: 4
- Active: 4

General characteristics
- Type: Cruise ship
- Tonnage: 153,516 GT; 170,412 GT
- Length: 323 m (1,059 ft 9 in); 339 m (1,112 ft 2 in)
- Beam: 41 m (134 ft 6 in)
- Draft: 8.5 m (27 ft 11 in)
- Depth: 12.1 m (39 ft 8 in)
- Decks: 18; 19
- Speed: 21.3 knots (39.4 km/h; 24.5 mph)
- Capacity: 5,119 passengers; 5,646 passengers
- Notes: Where applicable, second line indicates Seaside EVO specifications

The Seaside class is a class of four cruise ships owned and operated by MSC Cruises. The lead ship of the class, MSC Seaside, entered service in the Caribbean Sea in December 2017. A fourth cruise ship, the MSC Seascape was christened in New York on December 7, 2022.

== Design and engineering ==
The Seaside class is based on Fincantieri's "Project Mille". The two original Seaside-class ships in the class have 18 decks and 153,516 gross tonnage (GT), with a length of 323 metres (1,059 ft 9 in), a draft of 8.8 metres (28 ft 10 in), a depth of 12.1 metres (39 ft 8 in), and a beam of 41 metres (134 ft 6 in). The maximum passenger capacity is 5,119, with a crew complement of 1,413. The two Seaside EVO ships will measure 170,412 GT, with a length of 339 metres (1,112 ft 2 in); an additional deck and modified cabins will give them a passenger capacity of 5,646.

Seaside-class ships are powered by a diesel-electric genset system, with four Wärtsilä engines driving GE Marine electrical equipment. Main propulsion is via two propellers, each driven by a 20-megawatt (27,000 hp) electric motor; four forward and three aft 3.1-megawatt (4,200 hp) thrusters allow for close-quarters maneuvering. The system gives the vessels a maximum speed of 21.3 knots (39.4 km/h; 24.5 mph).

== Construction ==
The first two ships were ordered in May 2014 from Fincantieri, with each ship costing US$700 million, and scheduled to be delivered in November 2017 and May 2018, respectively. The order also came with an option for a third vessel.

Upon delivery of MSC Seaside in November 2017, MSC Cruises announced that it signed an order from Fincantieri for two new vessels that were to be an evolution from the existing Seaside-class platform, a sub-class to be dubbed "Seaside EVO". MSC explained that the option to build a third Seaside-class vessel was replaced with a new agreement to build the two Seaside EVO-class ships. Delivery for the two ships was completed in 2021 and 2022, respectively.

So far all of the ships of this class have been given the "Sea" prefix.

== Ships in class ==
Built	Ship	Tonnage	Flag	Notes
2017	MSC Seaside	153,516 GT	Malta	Entered service in December 2017
2018	MSC Seaview	153,516 GT	Malta	Entered service in June 2018
2021	MSC Seashore	170,412 GT	Malta	Entered service in August 2021
2022	MSC Seascape	170,412 GT	Malta	Entered service in November 2022
