= MSC Seaview =

Seaside-class cruise ship

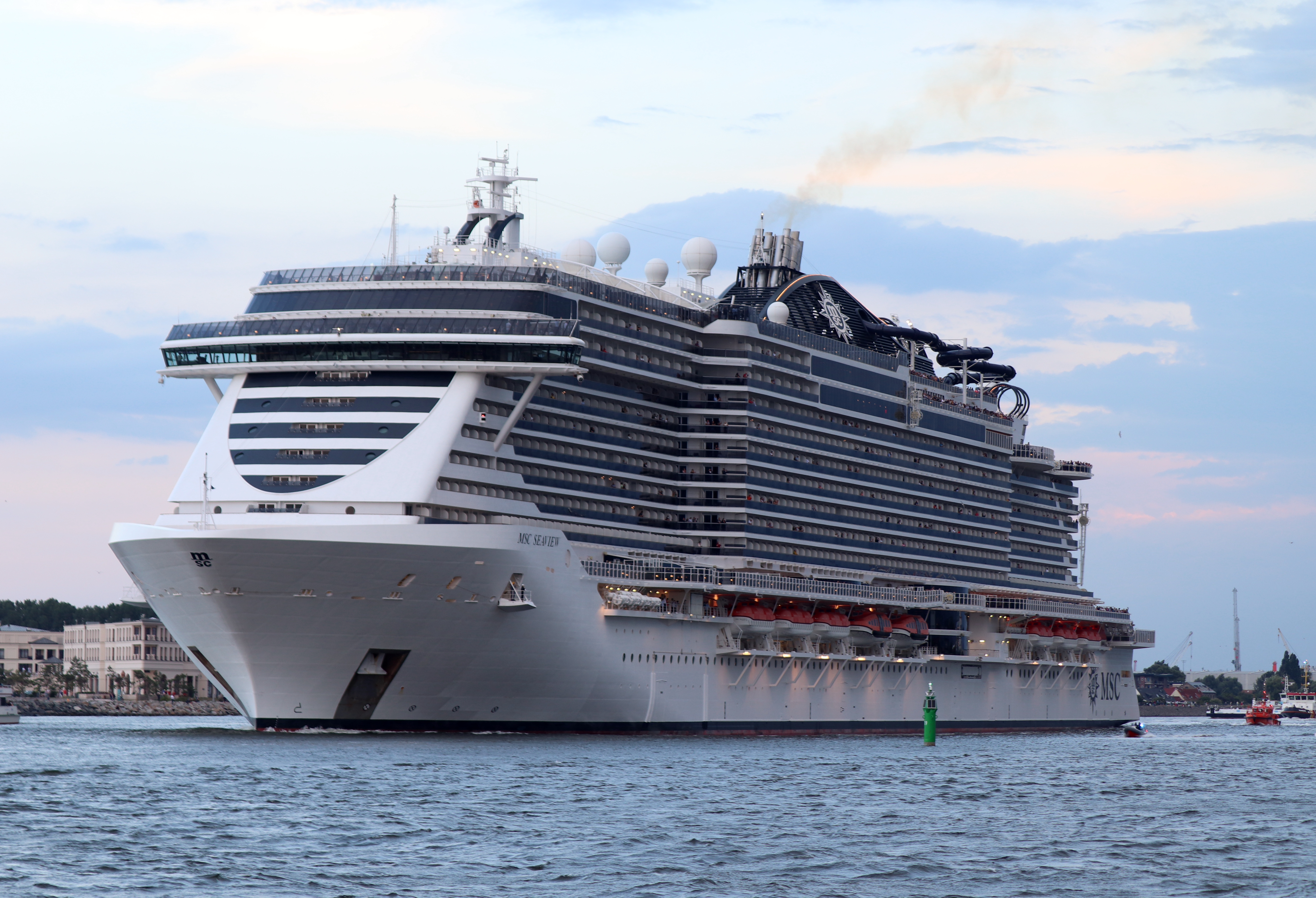
- MSC Seaview at Warnemünde, 2021

History
- Name: MSC Seaview
- Owner: MSC Cruises
- Operator: MSC Cruises
- Port of registry: Valletta, Malta
- Ordered: 22 May 2014
- Builder: Fincantieri; Monfalcone, Italy
- Cost: €700 million (2014)
- Laid down: 2 February 2017
- Launched: 23 August 2017
- Sponsored by: Sophia Loren
- Christened: 9 June 2018
- Identification: IMO number: 9745378; MMSI number: 248717000; Callsign: 9HA4777
- Status: In service

General characteristics
- Class & type: Seaside-class cruise ship
- Tonnage: 153,516 GT
- Length: 323 m (1,059 ft 9 in)
- Beam: 41 m (134 ft 6 in)
- Draft: 8.55 m (28 ft 1 in)
- Depth: 12.1 m (39 ft 8 in)
- Decks: 18
- Installed power: 62,400 kW (83,700 hp) (Total power)
- Propulsion: 2 × 14,400 kW (19,300 hp) Wärtsilä 12V46F; 2 × 16,800 kW (22,500 hp) Wärtsilä 14V46F
- Speed: 23 knots (43 km/h; 26 mph) (maximum speed)
- Capacity: 4,132 passengers (double occupancy); 5,119 passengers (maximum capacity)
- Crew: 1,413

MSC Seaview is a Seaside-class cruise ship owned and operated by MSC Cruises. Built by Italian shipbuilder Fincantieri in Monfalcone and delivered in June 2018, she is the sister ship to her class' lead vessel, MSC Seaside.

== Construction and delivery ==
On 22 May 2014, MSC Cruises announced that they had ordered two new 154,000-gross tonnage (GT) cruise ships from Fincantieri. The new order was based on the Seaside prototype, with each ship costing €700 million each.

On 16 October 2015, MSC performed the steel cutting ceremony for what would be their second Seaside-class ship at Monfalcone. MSC revealed the name of the second Seaside-class vessel as MSC Seaview the following year, on 4 July 2016. On 2 February 2017, MSC held the keel laying and coin ceremonies for the ship, in which two coins were placed under the ship's new keel block for good fortune before the keel was laid. On 23 August 2017, MSC Seaview was floated out from the shipyard. On 23 April 2018, she set sail for five days of sea trials.

MSC Seaview was delivered on 4 June 2018 with a ceremony at Monfalcone. She was christened at Genoa by her godmother, Sophia Loren, on 9 June 2018.

== Design and specifications ==
The overall architecture of MSC Seaview and identical sister ship MSC Seaside are based on Fincantieri's "Project Mille", a prototype that had not been executed 12 years since its initial conceptualization. Project Mille's prototype featured the diesel generators at midship, a wider hull, a narrower superstructure, and a relocation of heavy-weight public areas to lower decks to lower the ship's center of gravity. The ship's design reflects these features, along with a midship engine room and funnels, a wider boardwalk promenade along both sides of the ship, and a wider aft promenade deck that houses a large pool complementing those located on the top decks. The aft promenade deck is positioned at the base of the narrow, tower-like structure that houses cabins in the ship's aft. Other features and accommodations included are a water park custom-designed by WhiteWater West on the top deck, the MSC Yacht Club luxury area spanning five decks, which hosts passengers paying a premium for enhanced accommodations and amenities, three themed restaurants, a bowling alley, and a theater.

MSC Seaview has 18 decks, is 74 metres (242 ft 9 in) high, and a length of 323 metres (1,059 ft 9 in), a draft of 8.55 metres (28 ft 1 in), a depth of 12.1 metres (39 ft 8 in), and a beam of 41 metres (134 ft 6 in). The total passenger capacity is 5,119 across 2,066 passenger cabins, with a crew complement of 1,413 across 759 crew cabins, making for a maximum capacity of 6,592 persons. She is also powered by a diesel-electric genset system, with four Wärtsilä engines driving GE Marine electrical equipment and producing 62.4 megawatts (83,700 hp), and equipped with exhaust scrubbers to contend with soot. Main propulsion is via two propellers, each driven by a 20 megawatts (27,000 hp) electric motor; four forward and three aft 3.1 megawatts (4,200 hp) thrusters allow for close-quarters maneuvering. The system gives the vessel a service speed of 21.3 knots (39.4 km/h; 24.5 mph) and a maximum service speed of 23 knots (43 km/h; 26 mph)

== Operational career ==
MSC Seaview set off on her maiden voyage on 10 June 2018 from Genoa, a 7-day sailing around the Western Mediterranean, visiting Marseille, Barcelona, Naples, Messina, and Valletta. For her inaugural season, she continued sailing weekly voyages in the Western Mediterranean before re-positioning to Brazil for the winter 2018–2019 season. The rotation repeated the following year.

On 21 June 2019, an Irish national jumped overboard during a Mediterranean voyage and a crew member was credited for saving the passenger after they dove into the water to rescue the passenger. Both were later brought back onboard and sent to a local hospital and the ship resumed sailing thereafter.

She was originally scheduled to be deployed to her first season sailing in the Persian Gulf from her homeport of Dubai for the winter 2020–2021 season, but due to the COVID-19 pandemic forcing fleet redeployments, she was scheduled to return to Brazil during that timeframe. In summer 2021, she will return to the Mediterranean to sail weekly voyages.

During the COVID-19 pandemic, ten crew members aboard MSC Seaview reportedly tested positive for SARS-CoV-2. Subsequently, the ship entered quarantine at the Port of Santos on 30 April 2020. On 5 May 2020, Empresa Brasil de Comunicação reported that there were now 80 confirmed cases of the coronavirus, with another 30 suspected cases, out of a total of 615 crew members aboard. Later that day, the number of confirmed cases rose to 86.
