= MSC Splendida =

Fantasia-class cruise ship

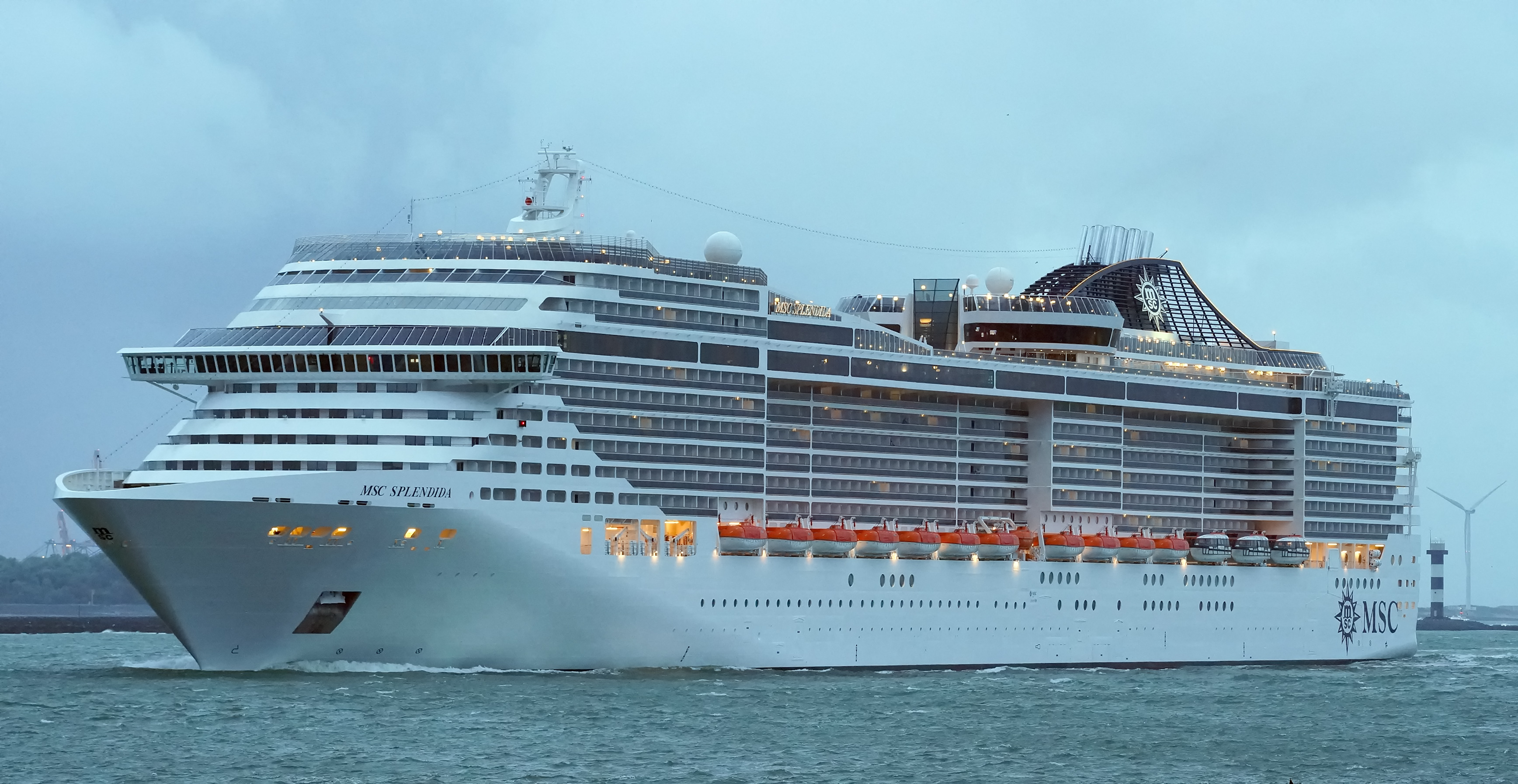

History
- Name: MSC Splendida
- Operator: MSC Cruises
- Port of registry: Panama
- Ordered: 16 November 2005
- Builder: STX Europe (St. Nazaire)
- Cost: $550 million
- Laid down: 24 October 2007
- Launched: 18 July 2008
- Christened: 12 July 2009 by Sophia Loren
- Completed: 2 July 2009
- Maiden voyage: 4 July 2009
- Identification: IMO number: 9359806; Call sign 3FZI8; MMSI 357698000
- Status: In service

General characteristics
- Class & type: Fantasia-class cruise ship
- Tonnage: 137,936 GT
- Length: 333.33 m (1,093.60 ft)
- Beam: 37.92 m (124.41 ft)
- Height: 66.81 m (219.2 ft)
- Draft: 8.29 m (27.2 ft)
- Decks: 18 total, 13 passenger decks
- Installed power: Diesel (40,000kW)
- Propulsion: 2 propellers
- Speed: 21 knots (39 km/h)
- Capacity: 3,900 passengers
- Crew: 1,313 crew
- Notes: 15 elevators, post-Panamax

MSC Splendida is a Fantasia-class cruise ship owned and operated by MSC Cruises. Constructed at STX France in Saint-Nazaire, she commenced service in July 2009 with $550m investment.

== History ==
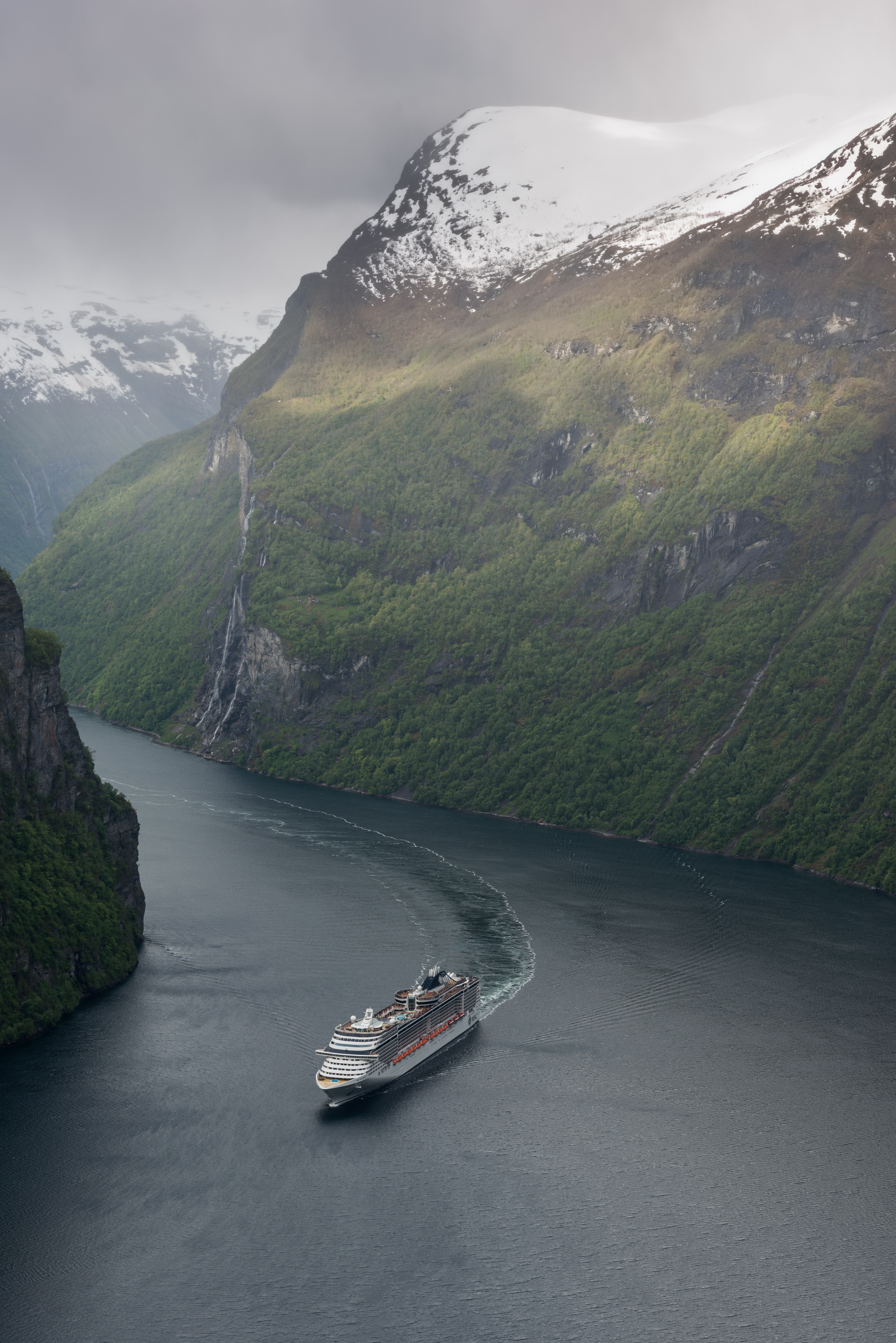
MSC Splendida in Geirangerfjorden in June 2015.

MSC Splendida was completed in 2009 at a cost of $550 million and is a sister ship to MSC Fantasia, originally, she was to be named MSC Serenata, but the name was changed in May 2007 to MSC Splendida She measures 137,936 GT, and is 333.30 m long with a beam of 37.98 m, a height of 66.81 m and a draft of 8.29 m. Her capacity is 3,900 passengers. The two Neopanamax vessels were to be the largest ships in a European cruise line's fleet at the time of delivery.

The then-unnamed vessel was part of a two-ship order made by MSC Cruises with STX France on 16 November 2005, for a tentative delivery in spring 2009. Construction began on then-MSC Serenata on 12 April 2007 with the steel-cutting. The ship was launched from the shipyard on 18 July 2008. She began her sea trials on 21 May 2009 and completed them on 27 May 2009. The ship was delivered to MSC Cruises on 4 July 2009. She embarked on her maiden voyage on 4 July 2009 and returned 11 July, to be officially named on 12 July 2009, in Barcelona by Sophia Loren, her godmother.

== Areas of operation ==
MSC Splendida has cruised the Mediterranean and Far East. She was refurbished in 2017 before deploying to China. In 2020 March, the ship docked in Palong, Thailand beach during the coronavirus pandemic, after more the 2,700 passengers was disembarked. The ship is scheduled to serve Southeast Asia until summer 2020 before repositioning to Northern Europe and the Mediterranean. The ship is scheduled to be based in Durban for the 2023/2024 cruise season and will serve the South African market sailing to Mozambique, Mauritius, Reunion, Namibia, Port Elizabeth & Cape Town.

== Amenities ==
The ship's horn system is programmed to play multiple songs, including "We Will Rock You" and "We Are the Champions" by Queen, "Seven Nation Army" by The White Stripes and "Happy Birthday to You".

== Incidents ==
=== Bardo National Museum attack ===
On 18 March 2015, MSC Splendida was in port in Tunis with Costa Fascinosa when gunmen opened fire on tourists at the Bardo National Museum. Twelve passengers hailing from Japan, Italy, Colombia, Spain, Britain, Australia, Poland, and France, were killed.

=== Coronavirus pandemic ===
On 23 March 2020, around 14:00 CET, a Thai crew member working aboard as a buffet attendant was medically evacuated via lifeboat after she exhibited symptoms consistent with COVID-19 and was having difficulty breathing. (Note: She had been suffering from a fever and a sore throat for three days, and her health had been worsening.) At the time, the ship was near the island of Sardinia and headed to Marseille (Note: The cruise originally was supposed to end at Genoa on 29 March, but the trip was cut short due to the pandemic and the end of the cruise was moved up to 4 March when it docked at Marseille.) to disembark all of its passengers.

On 24 March 2020, MSC Cruises informed the crew that the sick crew member had tested negative. However, two days later, on 26 March, it was reported that the sick crew member had been tested again, and this time, the test had returned positive. As a result, 16 crew members were placed under quarantine. The ship later docked in Genoa so that some of its crew members could disembark.

By 1 April 2020, 26 crew members had been placed under quarantine, with 3 crew members running high temperatures.

== In popular culture ==
MSC Splendida is featured on Indian Tamil film, Manmadan Ambu.
