= MSC Fantasia =

Cruise ship operating for MSC Cruises

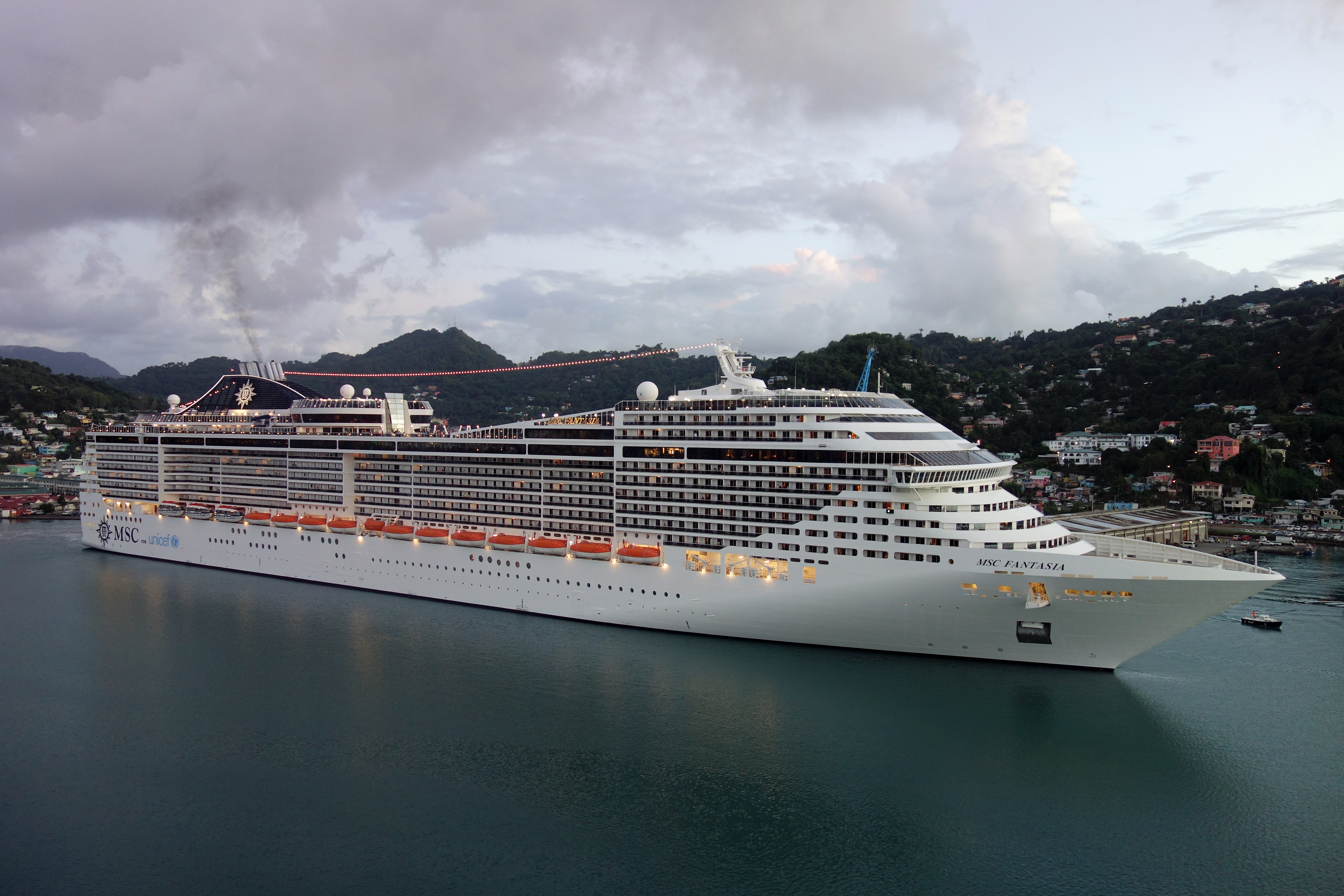
- MSC Fantasia in Castries, 2017

History

Panama
- Name: MSC Fantasia
- Owner: MSC Cruises
- Operator: MSC Cruises
- Port of registry: Panama
- Ordered: 1 June 2005
- Builder: STX France; Saint-Nazaire, France
- Cost: $550 million
- Yard number: A33
- Laid down: 9 January 2007
- Launched: 1 March 2008
- Christened: 18 December 2008 by Sophia Loren in Naples
- Completed: 9 December 2008
- Acquired: 10 December 2008
- Maiden voyage: 20 December 2008
- In service: 18 December 2008
- Identification: IMO number: 9359791; Call sign: 3ETR7; MMSI number: 370648000
- Status: In service

General characteristics
- Class & type: Fantasia-class cruise ship
- Tonnage: 137,936 GT, 107,916 NT, 15,000 DWT
- Length: 333.33 m (1,093 ft 7 in)
- Beam: 37.92 m (124 ft 5 in)
- Draft: 8.65 m (28 ft 5 in)
- Decks: 13 passenger decks, 18 total
- Propulsion: Diesel-electric; Two Converteam propulsion motors (2 × 20,200 kW) Fixed pitch propellers
- Speed: 21 knots (39 km/h; 24 mph) (cruising); 22.7 knots (42.0 km/h; 26.1 mph) (maximum)
- Capacity: 3,274 (double occupancy) 3,959 (max) passengers
- Crew: 1,313

MSC Fantasia is a Fantasia-class cruise ship owned and operated by MSC Cruises and serves as the lead vessel for the Fantasia class of ships. She entered service in December 2008 and ushered in a new generation of larger ships for MSC Cruises, becoming the largest ship to operate for MSC at the time of delivery. She was also the first vessel to feature the MSC Yacht Club, MSC Cruises ship within ship concept.

== Design and specifications ==
MSC Fantasia is powered by two shaft-driven propellers from three 12-cylinder and two 16-cylinder Wärtsilä 46 diesel-electric engines, producing a total output of 71,400 kilowatts (95,700 hp). The ship's electric motors come from Converteam, which drive the propellers located aft of two Becker Marine System flap rudders and stern thrusters.

Facilities include a spa, a 4D cinema, musical fountains, and a race car simulator.

== History ==
=== Planning and construction ===
In June 2005, unconfirmed reports first emerged that claimed MSC had signed a letter of intent with STX France for two post-Panamax ships set to debut in 2008 and 2009. STX France did confirm that the new 1,600-cabin and 4,000-passenger prototype for the ships was being finalized and considered. On 16 November 2005, MSC finalized a $1.2 billion two-ship order with STX France for what would be the largest ships in the fleet at the time of their delivery. The vessels were planned to be at 135,500 GT each, with a maximum guest capacity of 3,887 passengers, accompanied by 1,300 crew.

The first of the two ships, known as A33, began construction with a steel-cutting ceremony at the shipyard in Saint-Nazaire, France on 9 September 2006. She was floated out from the shipyard on 1 March 2008. The ship left to perform her sea trials for 48 hours in the Bay of Biscay on 24 October 2008 and returned on 27 October 2008.

=== Delivery and christening ===
She left the shipyard for the last time on 10 December 2008 and was officially delivered to MSC thereafter. From France, the ship sailed her first voyage headed for Naples for her christening via Lisbon, Gibraltar, Alicante, Barcelona, and Marseille. She was officially named on 18 December 2008 by her godmother, Sophia Loren.

=== Operational career ===
Following her christening, MSC Fantasia spent her inaugural season cruising from Genoa. Her inaugural cruise departed on 20 December 2008 for the Eastern Mediterranean, calling in Rhodes, Alexandria, Messina, and Naples. She then cruised round-trip Canary Islands and Western Mediterranean itineraries.

On 5 March 2009, high winds snapped the forward mooring lines of MSC Fantasia while she was docked in Spain. The bow drifted away from the dock side and caused a passenger gangway to collapse into the water. One passenger and three crew members had to be rescued from the sea. One passenger was taken to hospital with head injuries, while the other three were treated for hypothermia.

MSC Fantasia has also cruised beyond Europe and has been deployed to sail in the Caribbean from Guadeloupe and Martinique during the winter months. Between 2019 and 2021, MSC Fantasia cruised in South America in the fall and winter before returning to Europe in the summer. In summer 2021, she cruised weekly Mediterranean itineraries from Genoa in the place of MSC Seashore until 1 August, because Seashore's delivery was postponed due to construction delays caused by the COVID-19 pandemic.
