= MSC Seaside =

Cruise ship operating for MSC Cruises

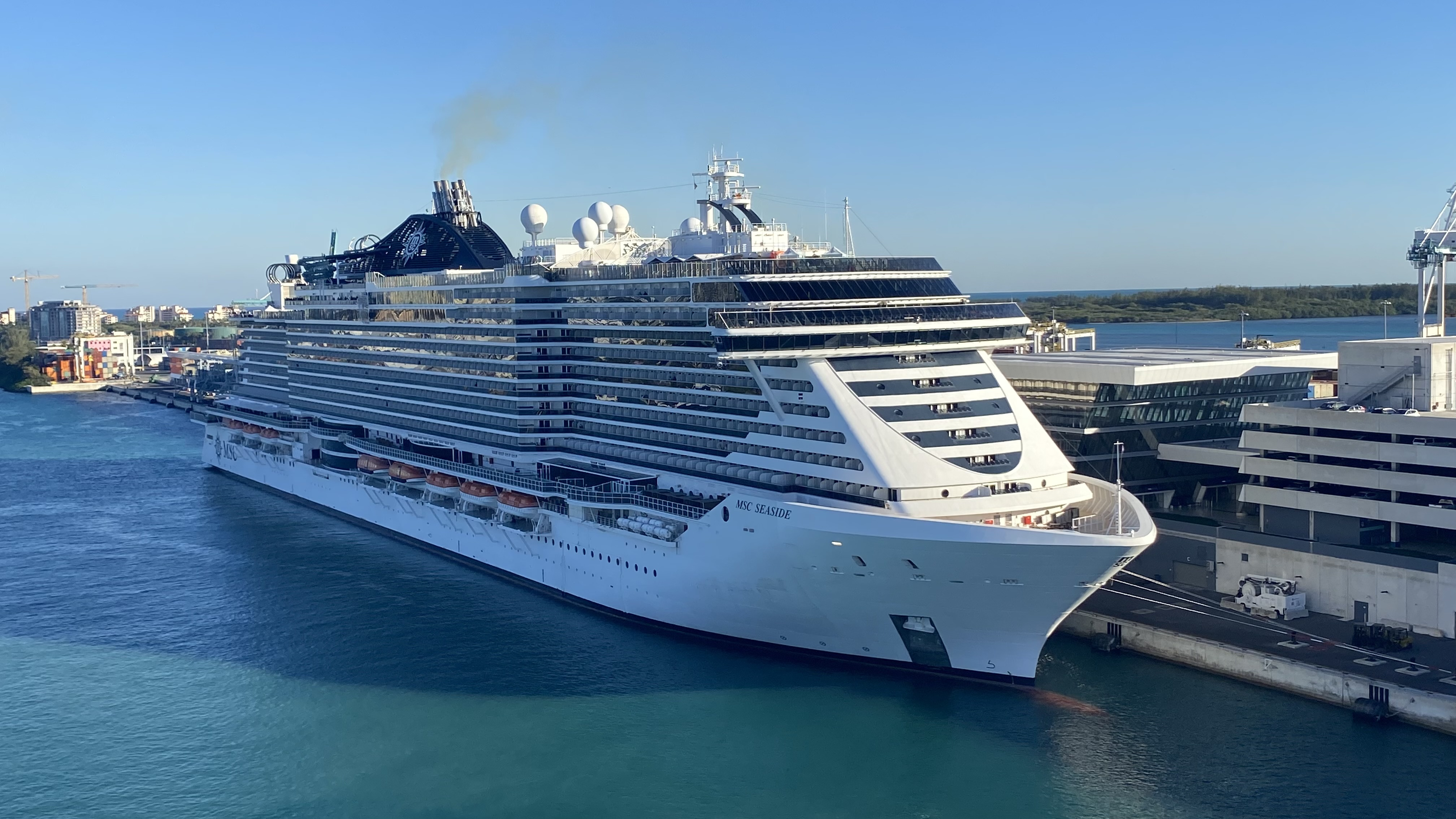
- MSC Seaside docking at PortMiami in Florida in February 2026

History

Malta
- Name: MSC Seaside
- Owner: Mediterranean Shipping Company
- Operator: MSC Cruises
- Port of registry: Valletta, Malta
- Ordered: 22 May 2014
- Builder: Fincantieri (Monfalcone, Italy)
- Cost: €700 million (2014)
- Yard number: 6256
- Laid down: 4 March 2016
- Launched: 26 November 2016
- Sponsored by: Sophia Loren
- Christened: 21 December 2017
- Completed: 29 November 2017
- In service: 2017–present
- Identification: Call sign: 9HA4638; IMO number: 9745366; MMSI number: 248392000
- Status: In service

General characteristics
- Type: Seaside-class cruise ship
- Tonnage: 153,516 GT
- Length: 323 m (1,059 ft 9 in)
- Beam: 41 m (134 ft 6 in)
- Draft: 8.55 m (28 ft 1 in)
- Depth: 12.1 m (39 ft 8 in)
- Decks: 18
- Installed power: 62,400 kW (83,700 hp) (Total power)
- Propulsion: 2 × 14,400 kW (19,300 hp) Wärtsilä 12V46F; 2 × 16,800 kW (22,500 hp) Wärtsilä 14V46F
- Speed: 21.3 knots (24.5 mph) (Service speed); 23 knots (26 mph) (Maximum speed)
- Capacity: 4,132 passengers (double occupancy); 5,119 passengers (maximum capacity)
- Crew: 1,413

MSC Seaside is a Seaside-class cruise ship currently owned and operated by MSC Cruises. As the lead vessel of the Seaside class, she lends her name to the company's Seaside class. At 153,516 gross tonnage (GT), she would become the largest cruise ship ever to be constructed by Italian shipbuilder Fincantieri, and the 45th largest cruise ship in the world, behind Norwegian Epic, upon her delivery in December 2017.

== History ==
=== Construction ===
On 22 May 2014, MSC Cruises announced it had ordered two new 154,000 GT cruise ships from Fincantieri. The new order was based on the Seaside prototype, with each ship costing €700 million each.

On 17 March 2015, MSC Cruises announced that the new ship would be named MSC Seaside, lending her name to the class of the sister ships that would follow. It was also announced that she would be sailing year-round from PortMiami to the Caribbean.

Construction officially began on MSC Seaside with the celebration of the first steel-cutting on 22 June 2015 at the Fincantieri shipyard in Monfalcone, Italy. On 4 March 2016, her keel-laying was performed, in which the first 550-ton block of the ship was laid, marking the beginning of the hull's assembly. Her coin ceremony was celebrated on 21 April 2016. The ship was floated out of the shipyard on 26 November 2016. She performed her first set of sea trials for 72 hours in late-August 2017 before finishing her final outfitting.

=== Debut ===
MSC Seaside was delivered to MSC Cruises on 29 November 2017 at the Fincantieri shipyard in Monfalcone. Her madrina, Asya Aponte, granddaughter of Gianluigi Aponte, MSC's founder and chairman, performed the honors at the delivery ceremony when she cut the ribbon to let the bottle of champagne strike the hull. The ship then departed the shipyard for Trieste and officially entered service on 1 December 2017 upon leaving Trieste for her 22-night maiden voyage, a transatlantic to PortMiami for her christening.

MSC Seaside was christened on 21 December 2017 by her godmother, Sophia Loren, at PortMiami's Terminal B, making her the first MSC cruise ship to be christened in North America. The ceremony was hosted by Mario Lopez and featured performances by Andrea Bocelli and Ricky Martin. MSC Seaside departed for her 14-night inaugural cruise on 23 December 2017 from Miami, which visited Antigua and Barbuda, the U.S. Virgin Islands, the Bahamas, Jamaica, the Cayman Islands, and Cozumel in Mexico.

=== Operational career ===
Between 2017 and 2020, MSC Seaside sailed week-long itineraries to the Caribbean from PortMiami year-round.

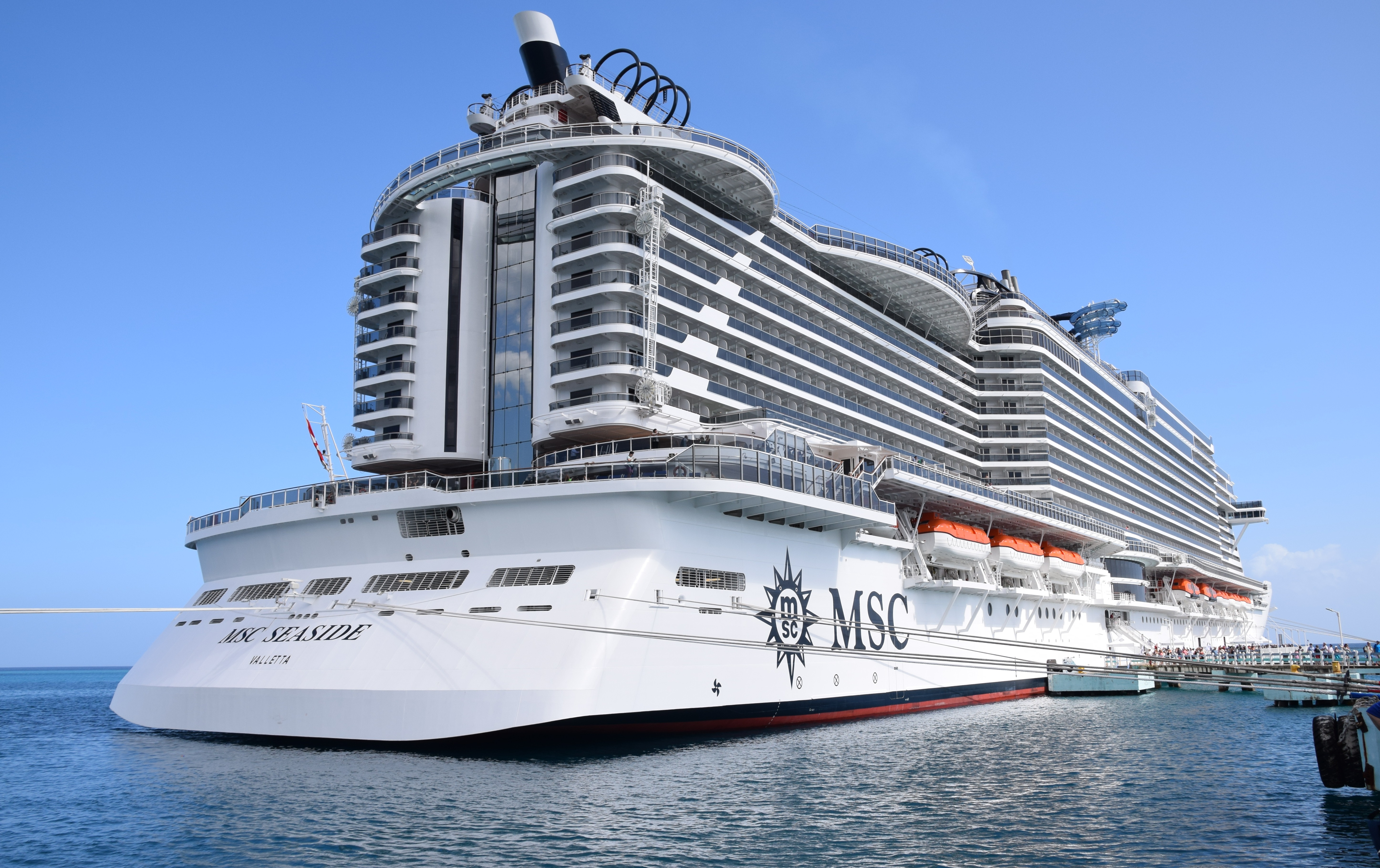
MSC Seaside docked at Ocho Rios, St. Ann Parish, Jamaica on March 12, 2018

On 17 November 2018, seven crew members were arrested at PortMiami after United States Customs and Border Protection officers found 7 kilograms (15 lb) of cocaine and a total of $100,000 in their cabins and in their possession. According to officers, the crew members were recruited by a fellow crew member to smuggle cocaine from Jamaica to the United States.

Beginning in fall 2020, MSC Seaside is scheduled to begin cruising three-to-seven-night cruises from Port Canaveral to the Caribbean. In summer 2021, MSC Seaside operated her first full season of Mediterranean voyages.

== Design and specifications ==
The overall architecture of MSC Seaside is based on Fincantieri's "Project Mille", a prototype that had not been executed 12 years since its initial conceptualization. "Project Mille"'s prototype featured the diesel generators at midship, a wider hull, a narrower superstructure, and a relocation of heavy-weight public areas to lower decks to lower the ship's center of gravity. MSC Seaside's current design reflects these features, along with a midship engine room and funnels, a wider boardwalk promenade along both sides of the ship, and a wider aft promenade deck that houses a large pool complementing those located on the top decks. The aft promenade deck is positioned at the base of the narrow, tower-like structure that houses cabins in the ship's aft. Other features and accommodations included on MSC Seaside are a water park custom-designed by WhiteWater West on the top deck, the MSC Yacht Club luxury area spanning five decks, which hosts passengers paying a premium for enhanced accommodations and amenities, the MSC Aurea Spa, three themed restaurants, a bowling alley, and a theater.

MSC Seaside has 18 decks and a length of 323 metres (1,059 ft 9 in), a draft of 8.8 metres (28 ft 10 in), a depth of 12.1 metres (39 ft 8 in), and a beam of 41 metres (134 ft 6 in). The maximum passenger capacity is 5,119, with a crew complement of 1,413. She is also powered by a diesel-electric genset system, with four Wärtsilä engines driving GE Marine electrical equipment, equipped with exhaust scrubbers to contend with soot. Main propulsion is via two propellers, each driven by a 20 megawatts (27,000 hp) electric motor; four forward and three aft 3.1 megawatts (4,200 hp) thrusters allow for close-quarters maneuvering. The system gives the vessel a service speed of 21.3 knots (39.4 km/h; 24.5 mph).

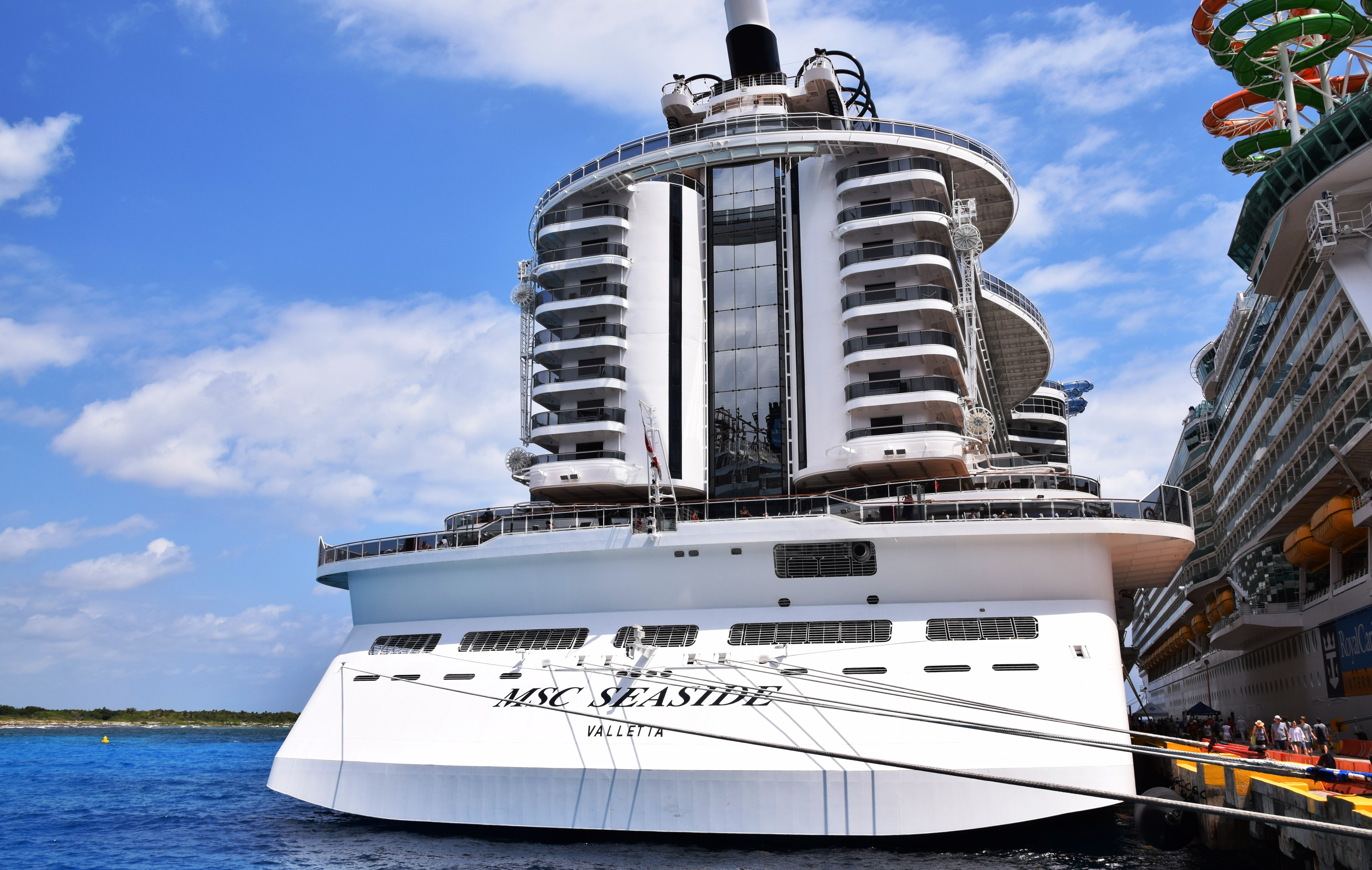
View of the stern, showing narrower superstructure, aft promenade deck, and aft cabin tower

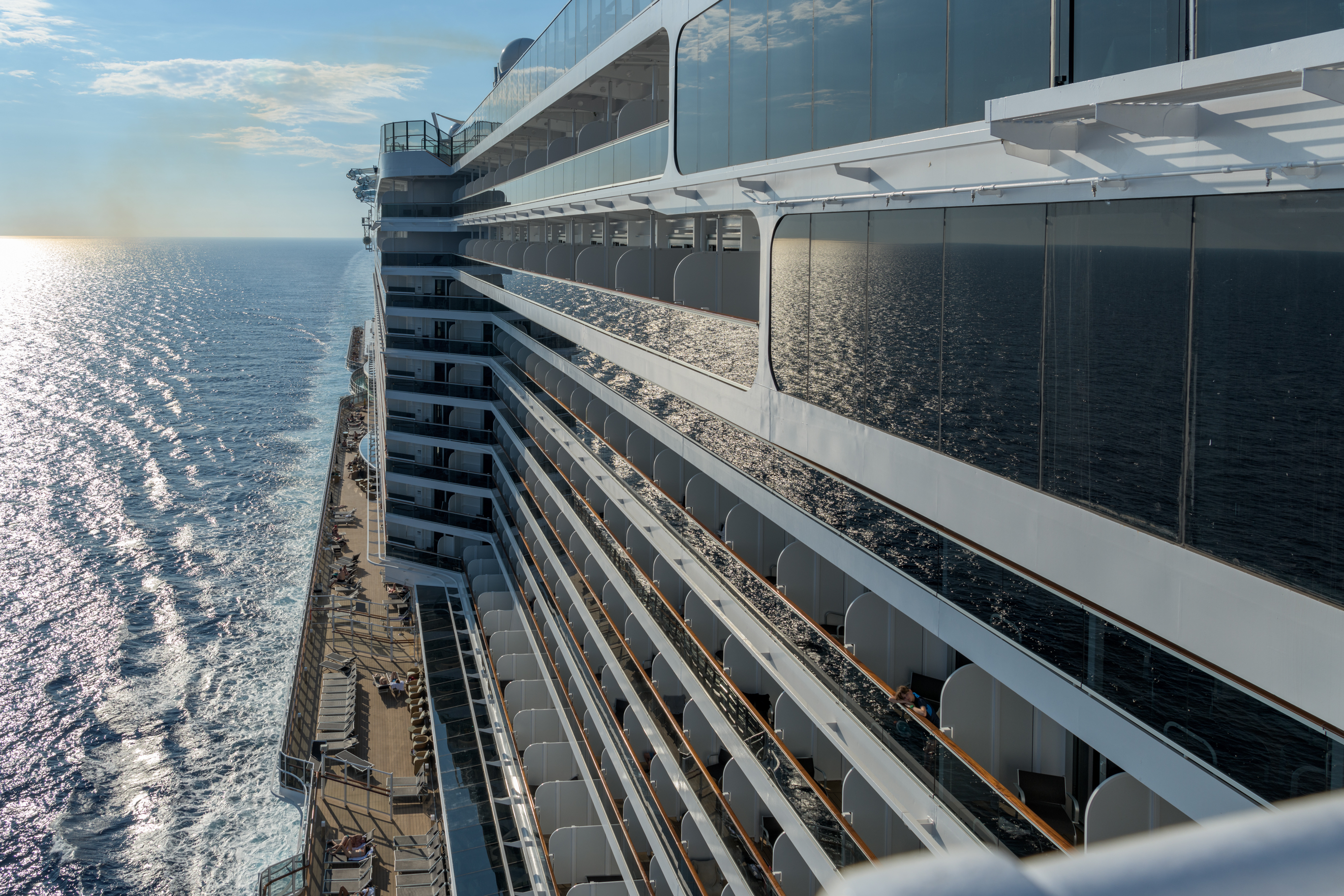
View of starboard side balconies and promenade deck below

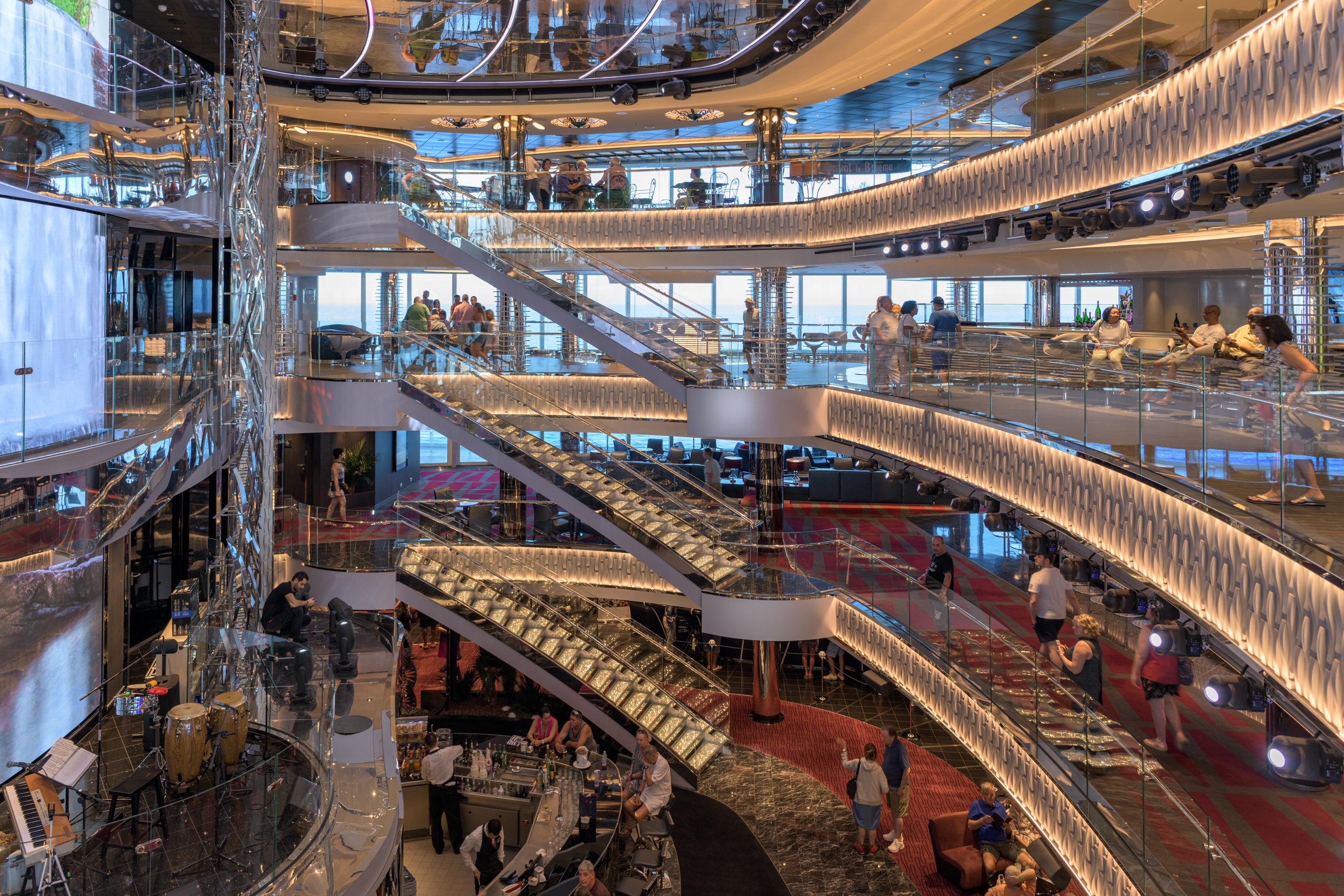
Midship atrium

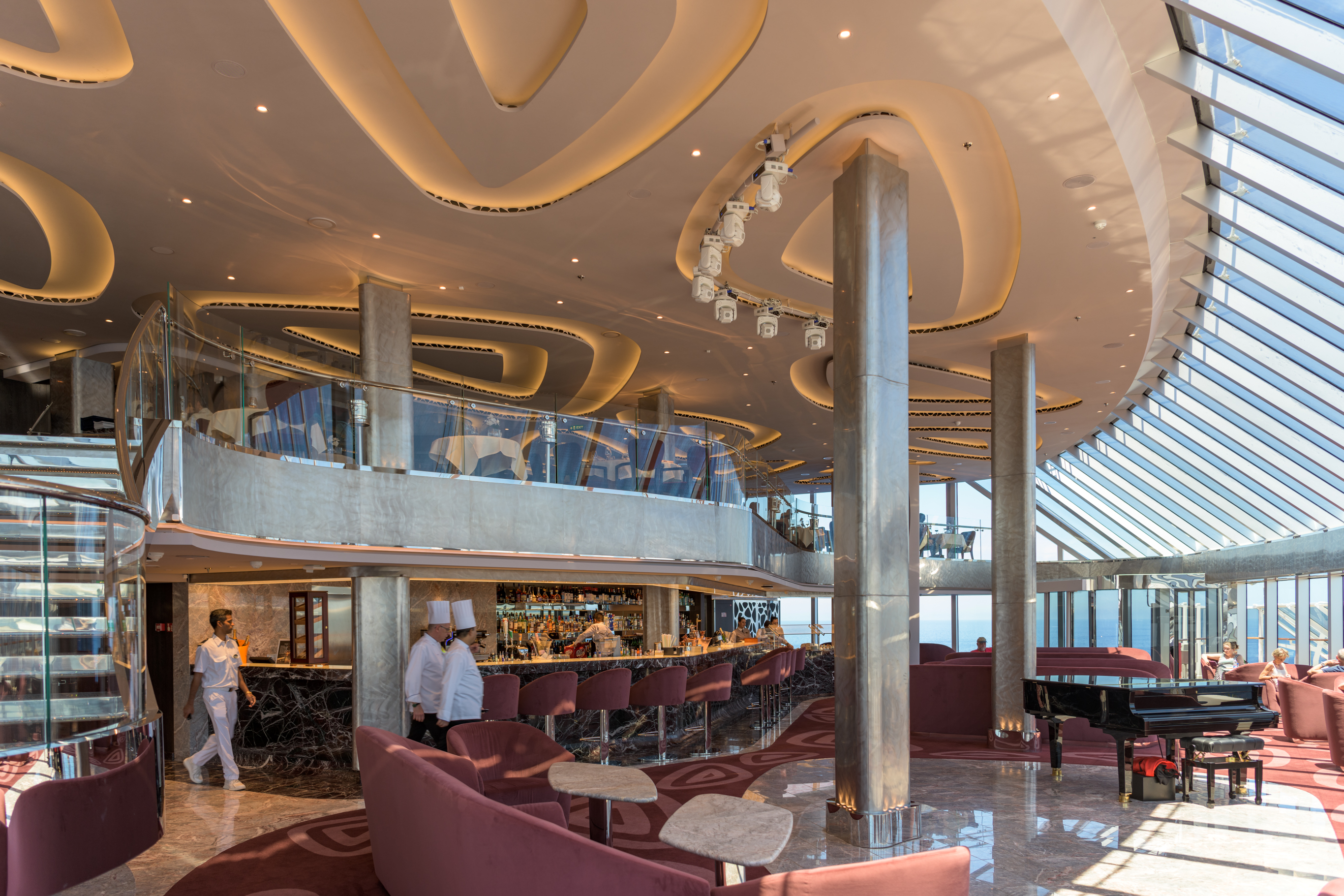
"Top Sail Lounge" for Yacht Club guests

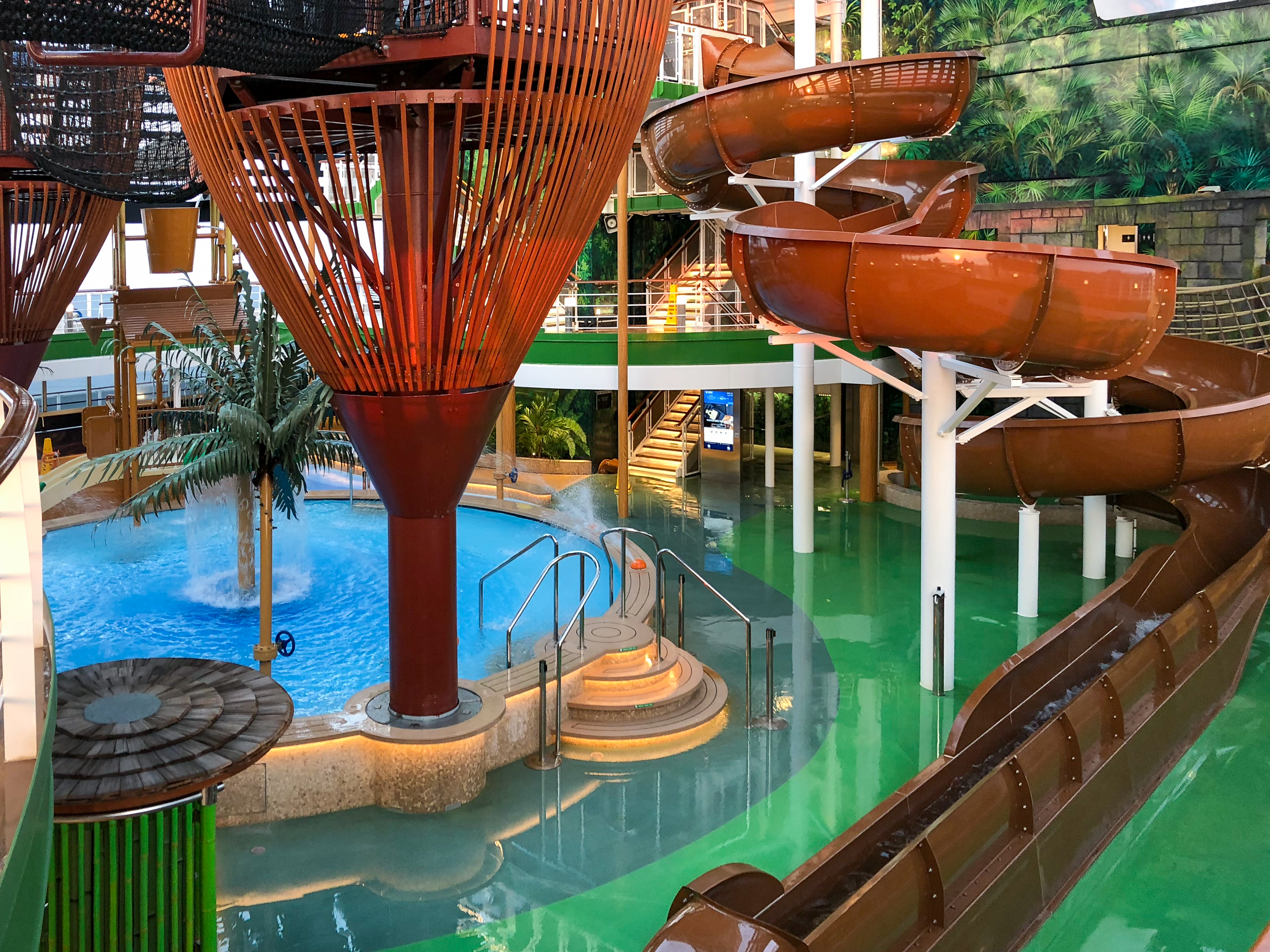
Water park

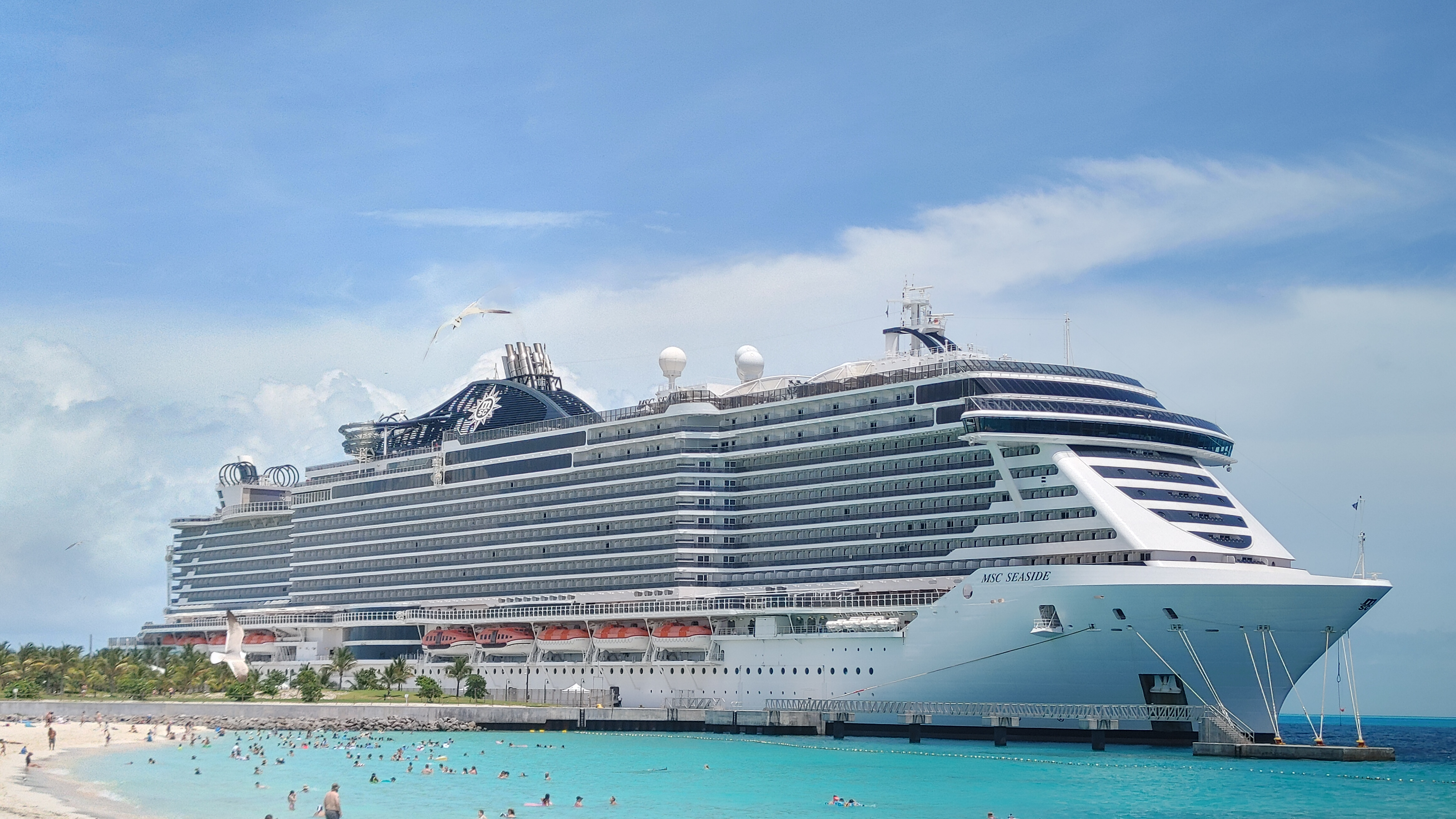
MSC Seaside docked at Ocean Cay
