= MS Renaissance (1992) =

French cruise ship

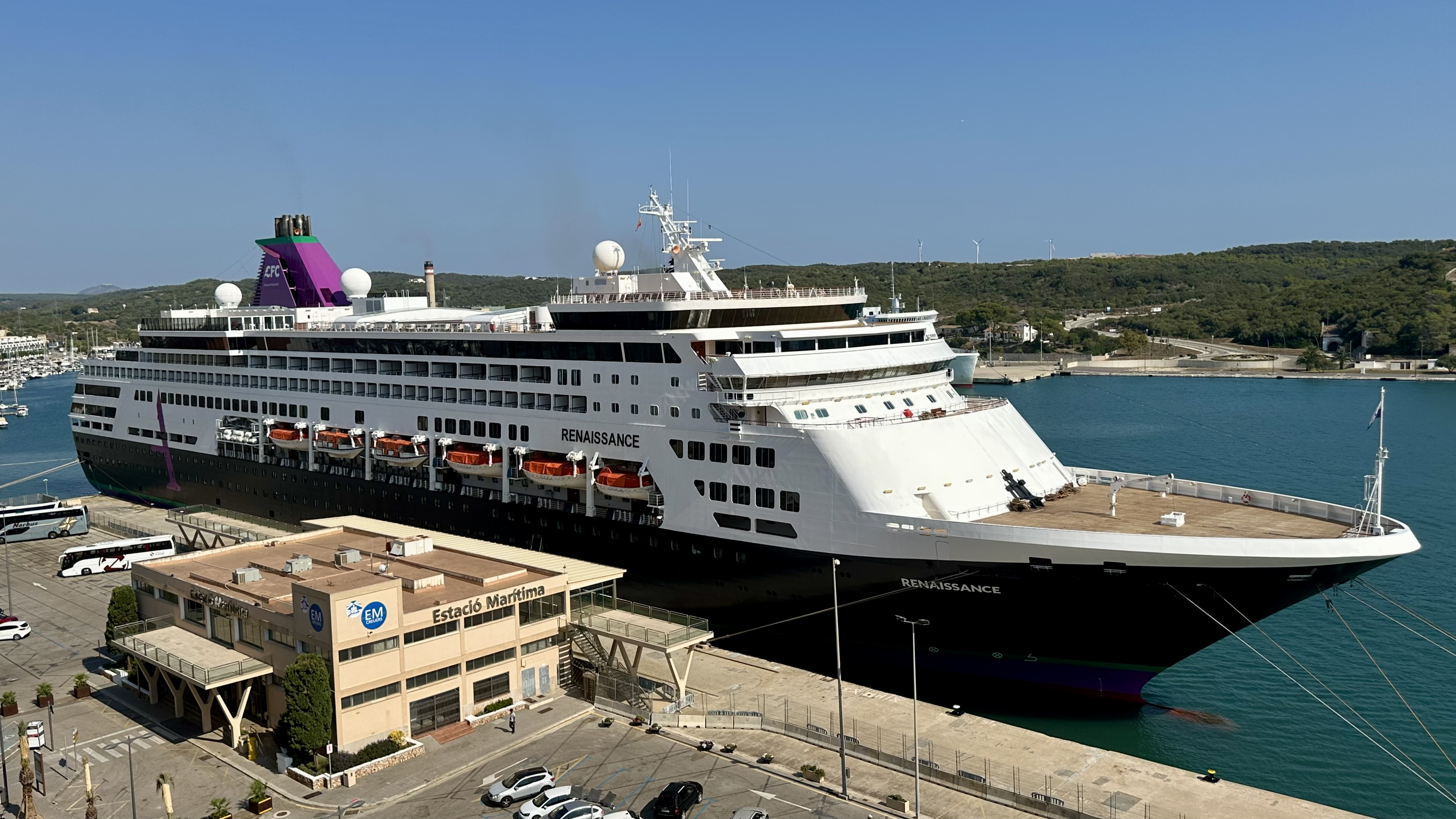
- Renaissance at Mahón, Menorca, Spain on 15 August 2025

History
- Name: Maasdam (1992–2020); Aegean Myth (2020–2022); Renaissance (2022–present)
- Owner: Carnival Corporation & plc (1992–2020); Seajets (2020–2022); Compagnie Française de Croisières (2022–2025); Ambassador Group (2025-Present)
- Operator: Holland America Line (1992–2020); Compagnie Française de Croisières (2023–2025); Ambassador Cruise Line (2025-Present)
- Port of registry: Netherlands, Rotterdam (2004–2020); Willemstad, Curacao (2020); Bermuda, Hamilton (2020–present)
- Ordered: 29 November 1989
- Builder: Fincantieri, Monfalcone, Italy
- Cost: US$180 million
- Yard number: 5882
- Launched: 12 January 1992
- Christened: 1993
- Completed: 26 October 1993
- Maiden voyage: 3 December 1993
- In service: 1993
- Identification: IMO number: 8919257; Call sign: ZCEZ8 (from 2020); MMSI no.: 310805000 (from 2020)
- Status: In service

General characteristics
- Class & type: S-class cruise ship
- Tonnage: 55,575 GT; 10,965 DWT
- Length: 220 m (721 ft 9 in)
- Beam: 30.937 m (101 ft 6.0 in)
- Height: 40 m (131 ft 3 in)
- Draught: 7.6 m (24 ft 11 in)
- Decks: 10
- Ice class: 1D
- Installed power: (All engines built under license by Fincantieri/Grandi Motori Trieste) 2 × Sulzer 12ZAV40S, 3 × Sulzer 8ZAL40 diesels
- Propulsion: Electric shaftline
- Speed: 22 knots (41 km/h; 25 mph)
- Capacity: 1,258 passengers
- Crew: 580

MS Renaissance is a cruise ship that re-entered service in June 2023. The ship was built in Italy in 1992 as Maasdam for Holland America Line. While sailing for Holland America, the vessel operated primarily in North American waters. In 2020 she was bought by Seajets and renamed Aegean Myth, but did not trade. The ship was bought in 2022 by a new French operator, Compagnie Française de Croisières (CFC).

In 2025, CFC agreed to merge with Ambassador Cruise Line, forming the Ambassador Group.

== Design and description ==
As Maasdam, the ship featured a teak promenade deck and her interior motifs paid homage to the Dutch East India Company and the Dutch West India Company. The centerpiece of the ship's atrium was a sculpture crafted by Luciano Vistosi and featured over 2,000 pieces of glass. Other pieces of ancient artifacts and art pieces were also spread throughout the ship.

== Construction ==
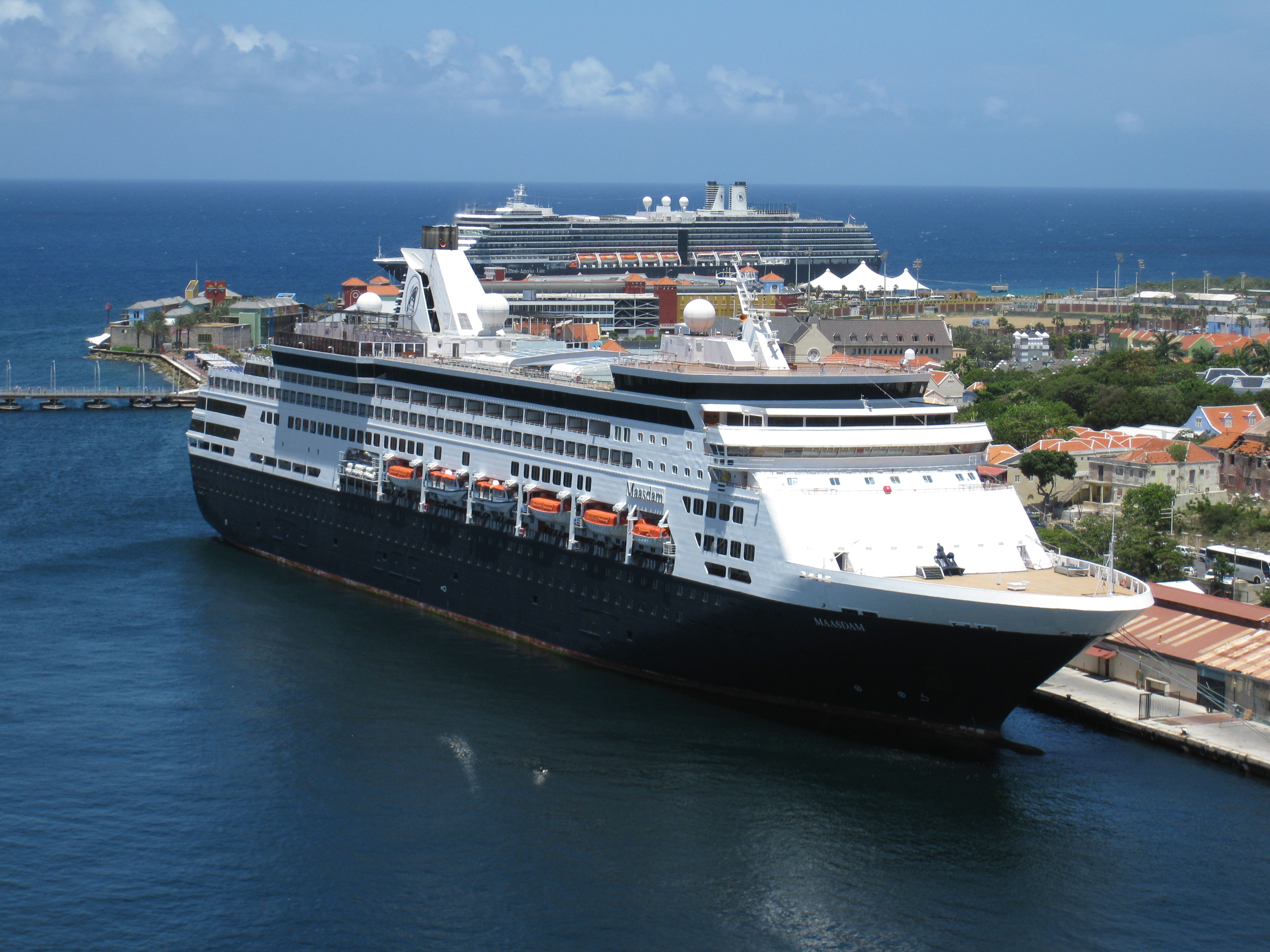
Maasdam at Curacao with MS Noordam on 10 May 2010

Maasdam was a member of Holland America's Statendam class, otherwise known as S class. She was ordered in November 1989 alongside two sister ships of her class, and was designated hull number 5882. Her keel was laid by Fincantieri in early 1992. Throughout 1992 and 1993, the ship was completed and underwent sea trials, and on 3 December 1993, Maasdam was christened by actress June Allyson at Port Everglades, Florida. Upon her maiden voyage into the Caribbean Sea, she became the fifth Holland America Line ship to bear the name Maasdam.

During her early planning and architectural design phases, there were concerns that Maasdam and the S class would not be in compliance with specific vessel stability requirements mandated by SOLAS 90. The hull design of Maasdam and her sister ships are largely based on costa Classica, a ship operated by sister brand Costa Cruises. These fears were alleviated, however, following the successful sea trials of the class's lead ship, MS Statendam.

== Holland America Line ==
Maasdam served different regions of the world based on the seasons during her tenure at Holland America. During winter months, she cruised to the Caribbean from Port Everglades. During the summer season, she sailed from Boston, Massachusetts to Europe, Atlantic Canada and New England.

In 2006, Maasdam underwent dry dock renovations at Grand Bahama Shipyard in Freeport, Grand Bahama. In 2011, Maasdam underwent dry dock renovations at Grand Bahama Shipyard in Freeport, Grand Bahama which increased her passenger capacity.

In December 2016, she visited Oceania, where she undertook voyages from New Zealand.

On 7 November 2018, during a 'Polynesian & South Seas Sampler' cruise, a 70-year-old female American passenger fell between the ship's Deck 3 tender platform and one of the ship's tenders. She was crushed, and she fell into the waters off of Rarotonga, Cook Islands and was later pronounced dead on board the same day. Maasdam returned to Rarotonga a few days later, but despite much calmer seas, Captain Ryan Whitaker canceled all tender operations.

In December 2019, the New Zealand Youth Choir used the Maasdam as a way to complete a planned South Pacific tour. The choir boarded Maasdam at Auckland, and gave several concerts aboard the ship, as well as at ports of call including Tonga, Fiji, New Caledonia and Sydney.

On 19 March 2020, 842 guests and 542 crew members on board Maasdam were barred from disembarkation in Honolulu, Hawaii due to fears surrounding COVID-19. The ship was allowed to take on appropriate provisions and supplies, however, and began a return journey to the Port of San Diego for debarkation.

Due to the COVID-19 pandemic, Holland America suspended its cruise operations through 30 June 2020, and sailings aboard Maasdam were cancelled. The following month it was announced that the ship was sold to Piraeus-based ferry operator Seajets, and she was laid up in Greece.

== Compagnie Française de Croisières ==
In September 2022, after two years laid up, the ship was purchased by the newly-formed cruise line Compagnie Française de Croisières (CFC), founded by entrepreneur Cedric Rivoire-Perrochat and Clement Mousset, and renamed Renaissance. CFC intended to reduce her capacity from 1,258 passengers to 1,100 passengers, served by 560 crew, with a launch date in February 2023 from Le Havre, France. In October 2022 the ship was sent to Damen Shipyards Brest for refit. Technical problems during the refit twice delayed re-entry into service and she began cruising from Le Havre in June 2023.

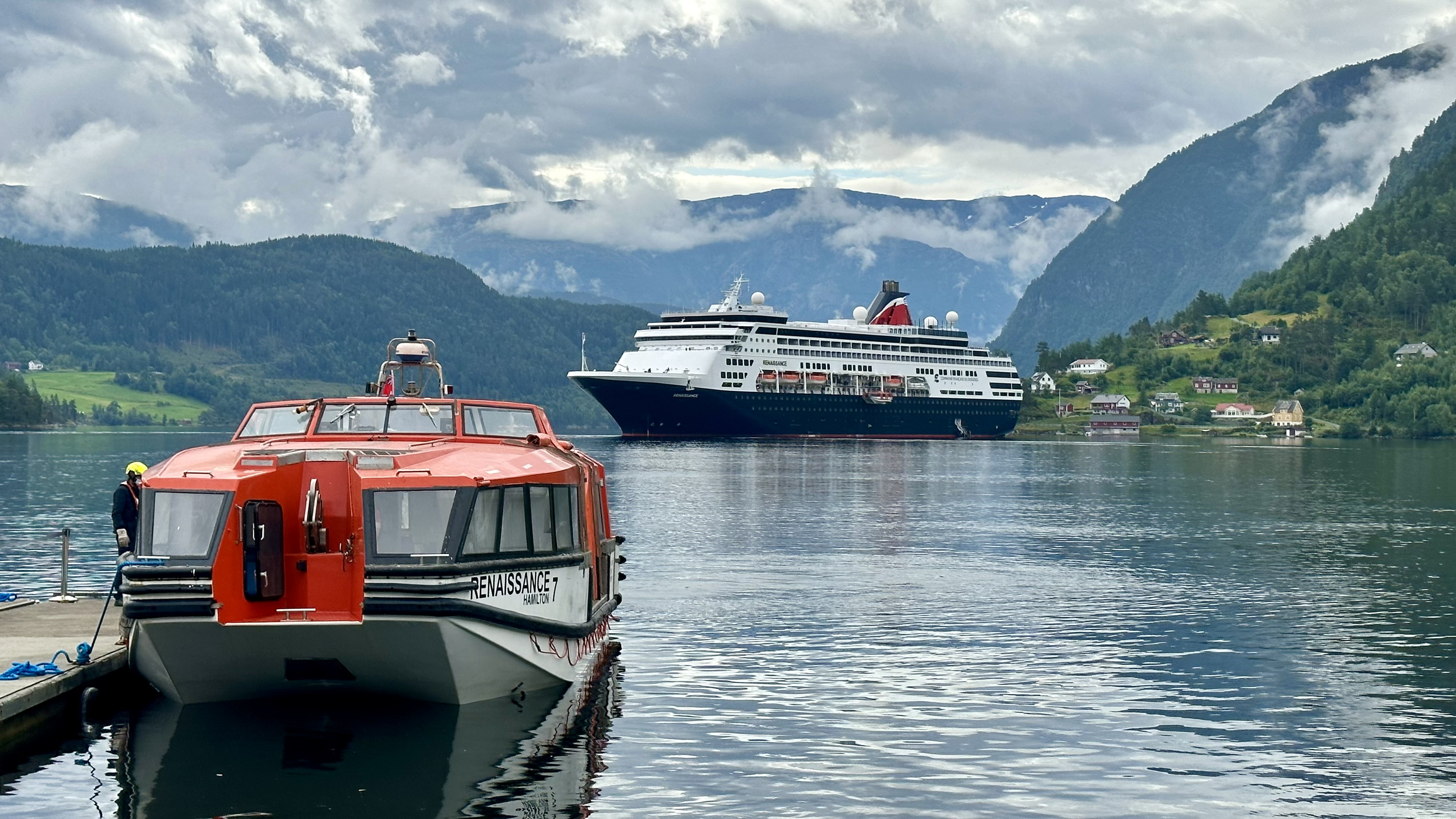
Renaissance at Ulvik, Vestland, Norway, on 14 August 2023

=== Ambassador Group ===
On 9 January 2025, Ambassador Cruise Line and CFC announced that they would merge, forming the Ambassador Group, with completion by the end of that month. Renaissance will join Ambience and Ambition but would continue to serve the French market under the CFC brand.

To meet the same emission standards (IMO Tier III) as the Ambassador ships, Renaissance received engine upgrades in January 2025, allowing her to go into sea areas in which stricter controls are required.
