= Margaritaville at Sea =

Cruise Line

- Formerly: Bahamas Paradise Cruise Line
- Industry: Tourism
- Founded: 2014 as Bahamas Paradise Cruise Line; 2022 as Margaritaville at Sea (as a cruise line)
- Headquarters: Orlando, Florida, United States
- Area served: The Bahamas, Caribbean Sea
- Key people: Christopher Ivy (CEO)
- Products: Cruises
- Website: Margaritaville at Sea

Margaritaville at Sea (formerly Bahamas Paradise Cruise Line) is a cruise line that operates cruises out of Florida to the Bahamas and the Caribbean. The company was incorporated in 2018 as Classica Cruise Operator Limited Inc. Originally founded as Bahamas Paradise Cruise Line in late 2016, the cruise line began operating its first cruises in January 2017 with the now retired Grand Celebration, and later in 2018 with the addition of Grand Classica. In May 2022, the company was rebranded to Margaritaville at Sea following a partnership between Bahamas Paradise Cruise Line and Jimmy Buffett's Margaritaville brand. Grand Classica was refurbished and renamed Margaritaville at Sea Paradise. In 2024, a second ship was acquired; the former Costa Atlantica was also refurbished and renamed Margaritaville at Sea Islander. Before the cruise line's rebranding, Margaritaville at Sea was previously a small chain of Margaritaville-style restaurants and bars that were included or later added to the newer Norwegian Cruise Line ships starting in 2015 with Norwegian Escape. The partnership with Norwegian Cruise Line ended in late 2019. The restaurants were later unbranded and converted into other dining venues.

== History ==
The original Margaritaville at Sea dining venue aboard Norwegian Escape prior to its closure

The predecessor company, Bahamas Paradise Cruise Line was formed after the majority-owned by the family of former Norwegian Cruise Line president and former CEO Kevin Sheehan purchased the assets of Celebration Cruise Line in December 2016.

On September 19, 2017 the Federal Emergency Management Agency chartered the ship for a 90-day period through December 2017 to house the National Guard in St. Thomas, which was devastated by Hurricane Irma. The ship returned to service on December 23, 2017.

It was announced in December 2017 that the cruise line purchased the former Costa Cruises ship Costa neoClassica. It entered service on April 13, 2018 as Grand Classica.

Beginning in September 2019, Bahamas Paradise Cruise Line began running Humanitarian missions to Grand Bahama Island in the wake of Hurricane Dorian.

In November 2020, the cruise line sold Grand Celebration to an undisclosed buyer, and in January 2021 she was beached in Alang for scrapping.

In September 2021, all cruises were cancelled as Grand Classica was chartered to Entergy in New Orleans to house over 1500 workers restoring power to the area following Hurricane Ida.

=== Rebranding to Margaritaville at Sea ===
On December 8, 2021, Jimmy Buffett's Margaritaville announced the partnership with the predecessor cruise line to rebrand it as Margaritaville at Sea. The last voyage under Bahamas Paradise Cruise Line took place on April 16, 2022. Upon the completion of the final cruise, Grand Classica sailed to the Grand Bahama Shipyard for a rebranding and refit of the ship's interiors and venues to be themed under the Margaritaville at Sea brand. During the refit, the ship was renamed Margaritaville at Sea Paradise. It began sailing for the rebranded line on April 30. It continues to offer two night cruises, and additional three- and four-night cruises from the Port of Palm Beach to Freeport and Nassau in the Bahamas, and Key West, Florida.

On December 4, 2023, Margaritaville at Sea announced that a second ship would be acquired and sail four- and five-night cruises to Key West and Mexico from the Port Tampa Bay. The ship is a Spirit-class cruise ship previously operated by Costa Cruises, and was renamed to Margaritaville at Sea Islander. The ship's inaugural sailing for the company was on June 14, 2024.

== Fleet ==
Ship	Class	Built	In service	Capacity	Tonnage	Flag	Homeport	Notes	Image
Current fleet
Margaritaville at Sea Paradise	Classica class	1991	2018–present	1,680	52,926 GT	Bahamas	Port of Palm Beach	Renamed Margaritaville Paradise in April 2022.; Former Costa Classica for Costa Cruises.	
Margaritaville at Sea Islander	Spirit class	2000	2024–present	2,680	85,619 GT	Bahamas	Port Tampa Bay	Formerly sailed as Costa Atlantica for Costa Cruises.; Joined the fleet in May 2024	
Future fleet
Margaritaville At Sea Beachcomber	Fortuna class	2003	2026	3,470	102,669 GT	Bahamas	Miami (From January 2027)	Formerly sailed as Costa Fortuna for Costa Cruises; Joining the fleet in late 2026	
Former fleet
Grand Celebration	Holiday class	1987	2015–2020	1,496	47,262 GT	Bahamas		Operated for Bahamas Paradise Cruise Line prior to the rebranding.; Former Celebration for Carnival Cruise Lines, Grand Celebration for Ibero Cruises, and Costa Celebration for Costa Crociere.; In January 2021 she was beached at Alang to be scrapped.	
