= Holiday-class cruise ship =

Cruise ship class

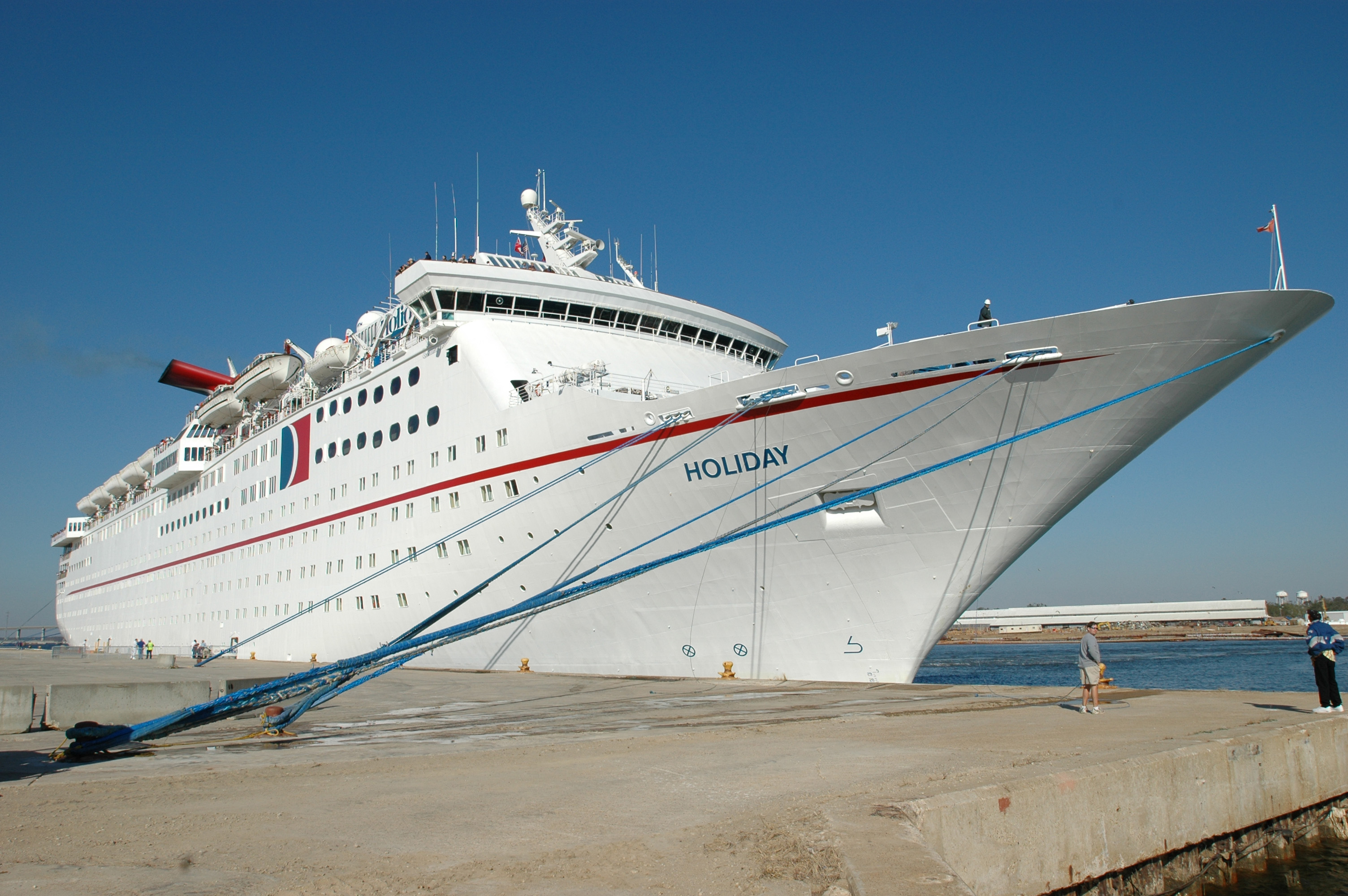
- Holiday, the first ship of the Holiday class, docked in Pascagoula, Mississippi.

Class overview
- Operators: Carnival Cruise Lines 1985–2009; P&O Cruises Australia 2004–2012; Iberocruceros 2008–2014; HNA Tourism 2012–2015; Bahamas Paradise Cruise Line 2015–2020; Cruise & Maritime Voyages 2015–2020
- Preceded by: Tropicale (Historical)
- Succeeded by: Fantasy class
- Built: 1985–1987
- In service: 1985–2020; Carnival Cruise Lines: 1985–2009; P&O Cruises Australia: 2004–2012; Iberocruceros: 2008–2014; HNA Tourism: 2012–2015; Cruise & Maritime Voyages: 2015–2020
- Completed: 3
- Scrapped: 3

General characteristics
- Type: Cruise ship
- Tonnage: 46,052 GT-47,262 GT
- Length: 727–733 ft (222–223 m)
- Decks: 10
- Speed: 21 knots (39 km/h; 24 mph)
- Capacity: 1,452–1,486 passengers
- Crew: 660–670

The Holiday class was the first class of newbuilds for Carnival Cruise Line after their first newbuild, Tropicale, which was completed in 1982. The first ship in the class, the 46,052 gross-ton vessel Holiday, was completed in 1985. A second and slightly larger sister ship, Jubilee, was built in 1986 at 47,262 gross tons. The third and final ship, Celebration, was identical to Jubilee and completed in 1987. All were the biggest ships for Carnival until the Fantasy class was built.

Carnival retired Jubilee in 2004 and transferred the ship to P&O Cruises Australia where it became Pacific Sun. In late 2005, Carnival took Holiday out of service to aid the victims of Hurricane Katrina for one year. Holiday then returned to service in late 2006 to resume cruising. Celebration was retired from Carnival's fleet in April 2008 to be used for a new sister company Iberocruceros as Grand Celebration. Carnival Cruise Lines retired Holiday in November 2009 and she began operating for Iberocruceros as Grand Holiday in May 2010.

In July 2012, P&O sold Pacific Sun to Chinese interests as Henna. Iberocruceros announced that Grand Celebration would be transferred to Costa Cruises in November 2014 as Costa Celebration. Also, in the same month, Costa Cruises announced that it would absorb Ibero Cruises in its entirety by the end of the year. Grand Celebration would still be transferred to the main fleet of Costa as Costa Celebration, and Grand Holiday would either be transferred or sold off. Ibero's docking slots in Barcelona, Spain, would be devoted solely to Costa's newest ship, Costa Diadema.

In November 2014 it was announced Grand Holiday would join Cruise & Maritime Voyages. In March 2015, after a refurbishment in Greece, she entered service as Magellan and operated a range of Northern Europe and worldwide itineraries sailing from London Tilbury, Newcastle upon Tyne and Dundee, United Kingdom. Also, in November 2014, it was announced Costa Celebration had been sold to an unnamed buyer. The vessel completed its last cruise for the Spanish company Iberocruceros and entered drydock in Marseille, France, to be rebranded under Costa livery. The buyer was announced as Bahamas Paradise Cruise Line. The ship has returned to its old name as Grand Celebration and since February 2015 began sailing out of the Port of Palm Beach in Riviera Beach, Florida for cruises to Freeport, Bahamas.

In November 2015, HNA shut down its cruise ship operation after three years of losing money, due to newer vessels being deployed to the region. Since Henna's last cruise with HNA, she was laid up and put for sale for 35 million USD. With there being no interested buyers, the ship arrived in Alang, India, under the name Hen to be broken up in April 2017.

In 2020, the COVID-19 pandemic had greatly affected the cruise industry as cruise lines worldwide were forced to suspend sailing operations. The continued economic losses from suspended operations have resulted in some of the cruise lines either filing for bankruptcy or selling some of their ships to shed operating costs and lower their mounting debt. This had caused the demise of the two remaining Holiday class vessels. In November 2020, Bahamas Paradise Cruise line sold Grand Celebration for scrap. The ship was renamed Grand. It arrived in Alang, India and was beached for scrapping on January 14, 2021. Soon after Grand Celebration was beached for scrapping, Seajets sold Magellan for scrap after acquiring it from Cruise & Maritime Voyages following their bankruptcy. Magellan was renamed Mages and was beached in Alang, India for scrapping on January 30, 2021.

== Ships ==
Ship	Year Built	Years In Operation	Tonnage	Operational History	Image
Holiday	1985	1985–2020	46,052 GT	Operated for Carnival Cruise Lines from 1985 until 2009. Later operated as Grand Holiday for Iberocruceros from 2010 until 2014. It last operated as Magellan with Cruise & Maritime Voyages from 2015 until 2020. Purchased by Seajets in October 2020 following the bankruptcy of CMV but never operated any cruises. It was scrapped in Alang, India as Mages in 2021.	
Jubilee	1986	1986–2015	47,262 GT	Operated for Carnival Cruise Lines from 1986 until 2004. Later operated as Pacific Sun for P&O Australia from 2004 until 2012. Last operated as Henna for HNA Tourism from 2012 until 2015. Withdrawn from service in 2015 and was scrapped in Alang, India as the Hen in 2017.	
Celebration	1987	1987–2020	47,262 GT	Operated for Carnival Cruise Lines from 1987 until 2008. Later operated as Grand Celebration for Iberocruceros from 2008 until 2014. It later became the Costa Celebration for Costa Cruises in late 2014 but was never put into service. It last operated as Grand Celebration for Bahamas Paradise Cruise Line from 2015 until 2020. It was scrapped in Alang, India as Grand in 2021.	
