= Chinese Taishan =

Cruise ship built in 2000

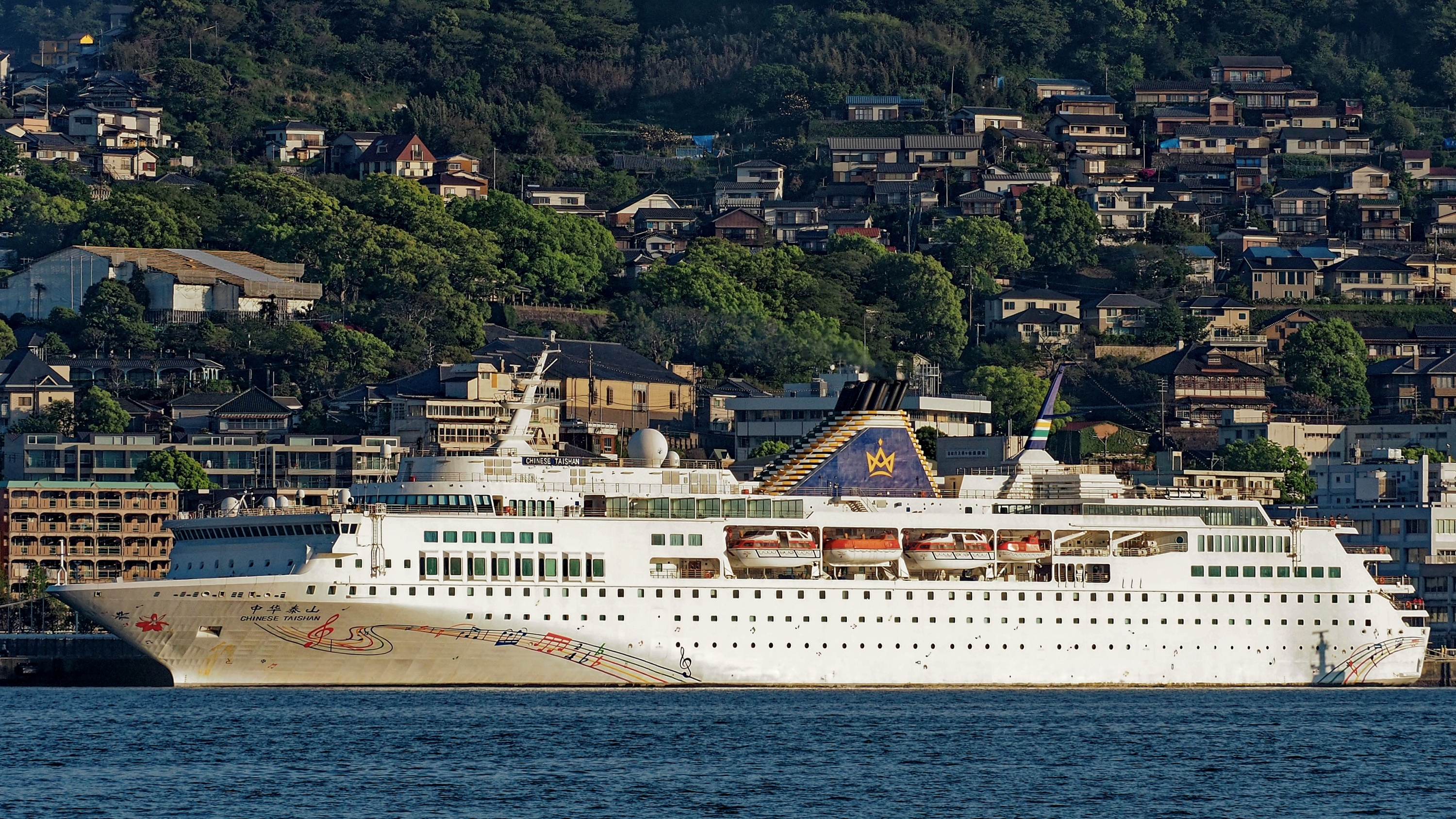
- Chinese Taishan at Nagasaki on 20 April 2019

History
- Name: 2000–2004: Olympic Voyager; 2004–2005: Voyager; 2005–2011: Grand Voyager; 2011–2014: Costa Voyager; 2014–present: Chinese Taishan
- Owner: 2000–2005: Royal Olympic Cruises; 2005–2014: Carnival Corporation & plc; 2014–present: Bohai Ferry Company
- Operator: 2000–2005: Royal Olympic Cruises; 2005–2011: Iberocruceros; 2011–2014: Costa Crociere; 2014-present: Bohai Ferry Company
- Port of registry: 2000–2004: Piraeus, Greece; 2004–2008: Nassau, Bahamas; 2008–2009: Genova, Italy; 2009–2011: Madeira, Portugal; 2011–2014: Genova, Italy; 2014–2017: Panama, Panama; 2017–present: Monrovia, Liberia
- Builder: Blohm + Voss, Hamburg
- Yard number: 961
- Laid down: 2014
- Launched: 14 July 1999
- Christened: 22 June 2000
- Completed: 2000
- Maiden voyage: 24 June 2000
- In service: 24 June 2000
- Identification: Call sign: D5MU2; IMO number: 9183506; MMSI number: 636017800
- Status: In service

General characteristics
- Type: Cruise ship
- Tonnage: 24,427 GT
- Length: 180.7 m (592 ft 10 in)
- Beam: 25.6 m (84 ft 0 in)
- Decks: 6
- Installed power: 4 × Wärtsilä 9L46C, 4 × 12,852 hp (9,584 kW)
- Propulsion: Diesel-electric twin-propeller inboard
- Speed: 28 knots (52 km/h; 32 mph) max.
- Capacity: 832/927 passengers in 416 cabins
- Crew: 353

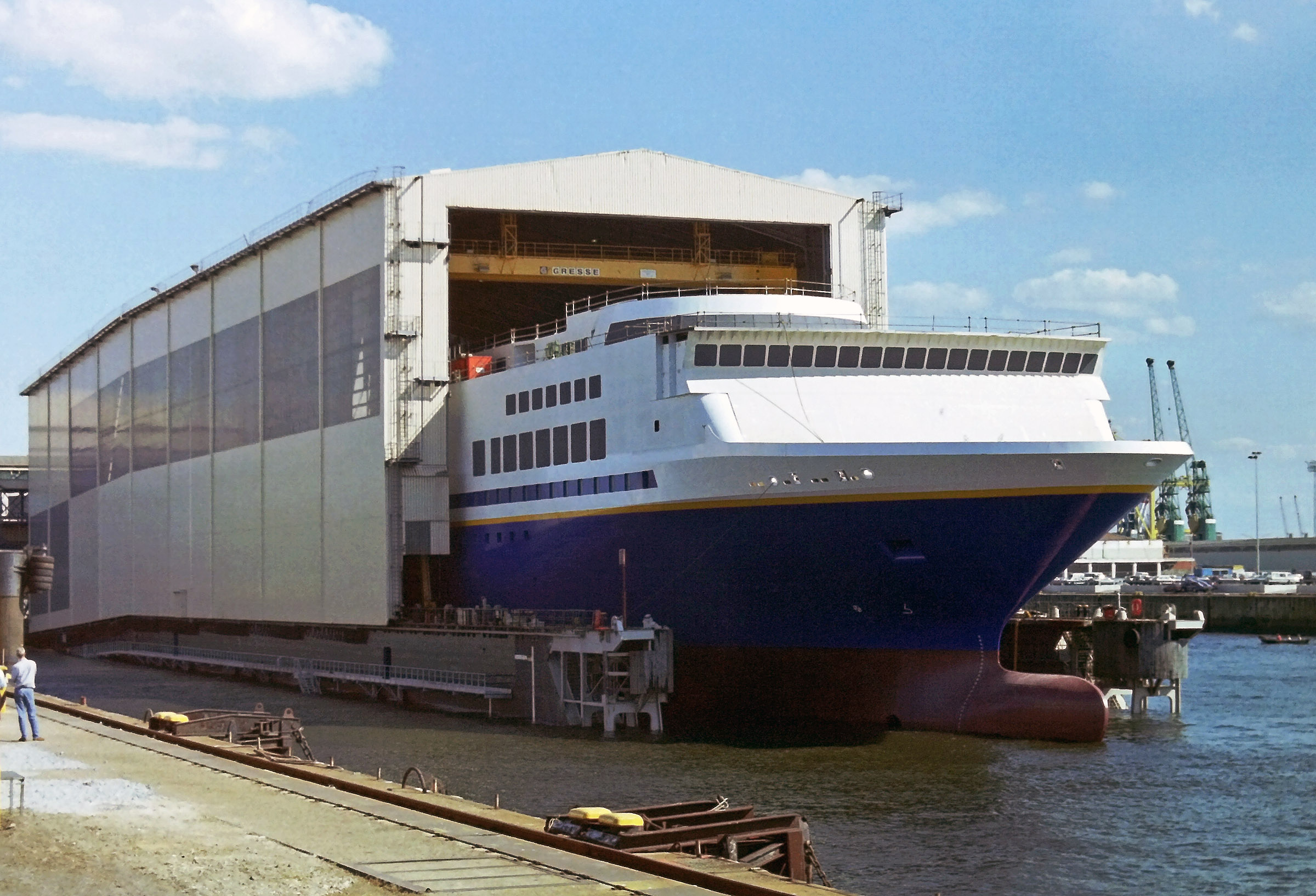
Olympic Voyager's launch at Hamburg, 1999

MS Chinese Taishan (Chinese: 中华泰山号) is a cruise ship that was formerly owned by Royal Olympic Cruises and Carnival Corporation & plc, sailing for Carnival subsidiaries Costa Crociere and Ibero Cruises as Grand Voyager.

On 14 February 2005, Grand Voyager was struck by a freak wave during a mistral storm while operating in the Mediterranean Sea. A 40-to-50-foot (12 to 15 m) tall wave knocked out a window on the bridge and ingressing water disabled the ship's engine controls. Dramatic video of the ship helplessly adrift and rolling to extreme angles was captured by rescue helicopters. The incident occurred less than a month after a similar situation happened aboard Grand Voyager's sister ship Explorer operating in the Pacific.

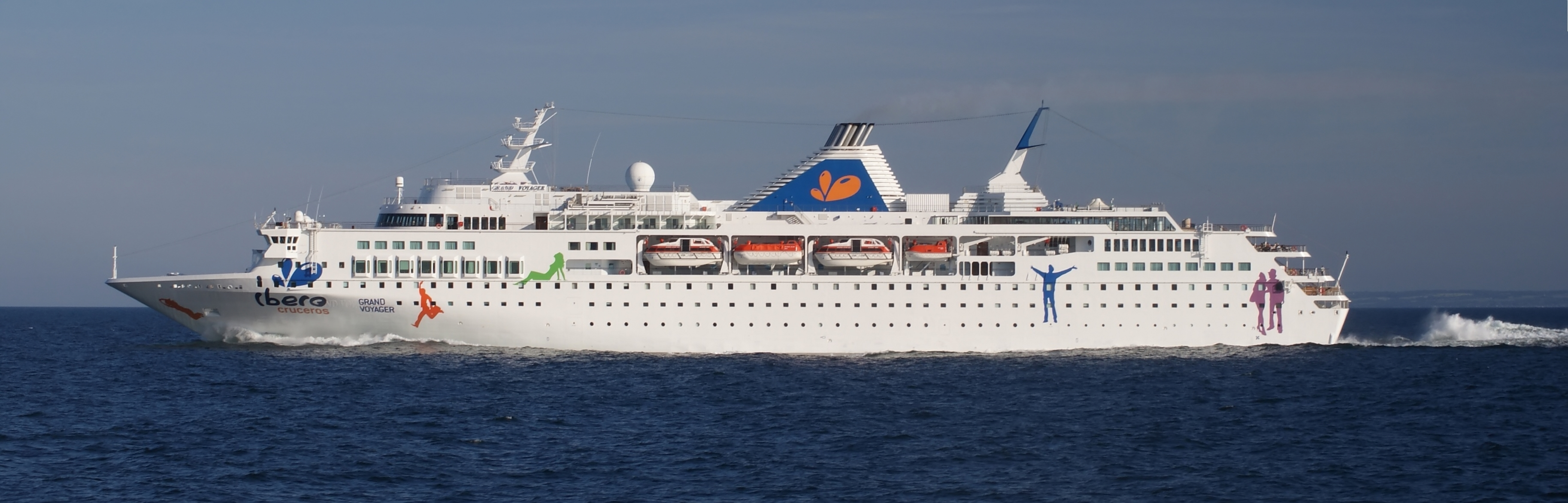
Grand Voyager in 2009

She entered service for Costa in December 2011, and originally scheduled to sail Costa's Corals and Ancient Treasures Red Sea itinerary. She sailed in the Mediterranean and Northern Europe, dedicated to guests from the French market. The ship sailed voyages from Amsterdam and the Mediterranean Sea.

The vessel was sold for $43.68 million to Bohai Ferry Company of Yantai in February 2014, and was renamed Chinese Taishan.

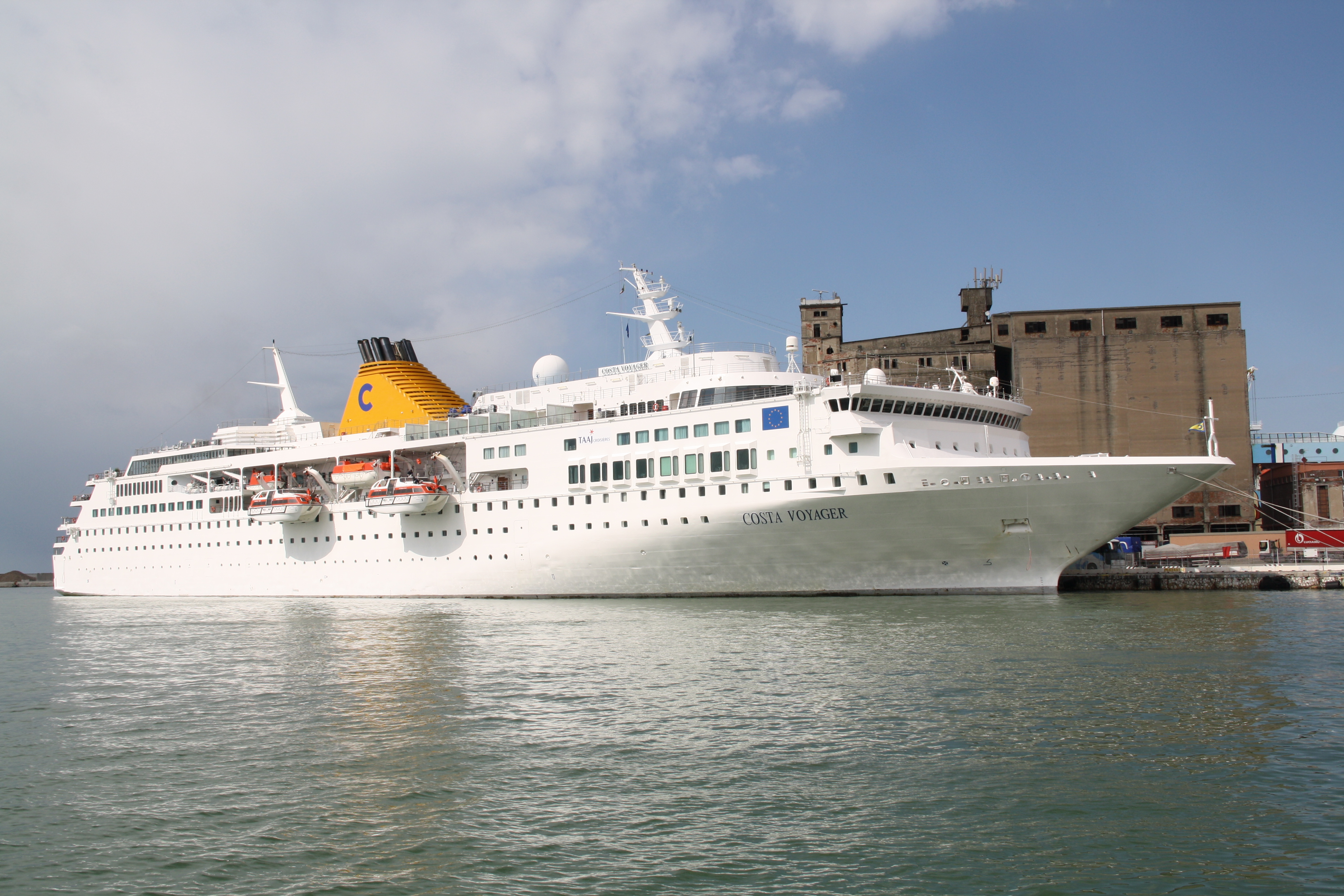
Costa Voyager at Livorno
