= Ambassador Cruise Line =

British cruise line

- Type: Private company
- Industry: Hospitality and transportation
- Founded: 2021
- Founder: Christian Verhounig
- Headquarters: Purfleet, England
- Area served: Worldwide
- Key people: Christian Verhounig (CEO)
- Products: Cruises
- Parent: Njord Partners
- Website: www.ambassadorcruiseline.com

Ambassador Cruise Line is a British cruise line headquartered in Purfleet, England. The company launched and announced the purchase of its flagship Ambience in May 2021 and commenced sales to the public in the following month.

Ambassador Cruise Line tailors towards premium-value no fly cruises which target the adult market, including over 50s, with sailings for families during summer months. Ambassador Cruise Line operates from eight ports in the United Kingdom: London Tilbury, Newcastle, Dundee, Edinburgh Leith, Bristol Royal Portbury, Falmouth, Liverpool and Belfast with London Tilbury and Newcastle being the home ports of Ambience and Ambition respectively.

The cruise liner offers cruises to destinations such as the British Isles, the Baltics, Scandinavia, Northern Europe, the Mediterranean, the Canary Islands, as well as Cuba and the Caribbean.

== History ==
Ambassador Cruise Line was established in 2021 by Christian Verhounig, who was the former CEO of Cruise & Maritime Voyages which went into administration in 2020.

In 2023, Ambassador cruise line announced that their ships will have internet connections from Starlink and that Ambience would sail the grand round-the-world cruise in 2024. Ambassador sponsored the 2025 World Indoor Bowls Championship in January 2025.

=== Launch of Ambience and Ambition ===
Ambience set sail for the first time on 20 April 2022, with a short cruise to Hamburg, Germany, followed by a cruise to Norway. Ambition launched on the 10 May 2023 after being named by British sailor Shirley Robertson OBE and then set sail for the first time on the 12 May 2023 from Port of Tyne to Dundee, Robertson's birthplace, before heading down to France and Spain.

=== Ambassador Group and Renaissance ===
On 9 January 2025, Ambassador Cruise Line and Compagnie Française de Croisières (CFC) announced that they would merge, forming the Ambassador Group, with completion by the end of that month. CFC's Renaissance will join Ambassador's ships but will continue to serve the French market under the CFC brand. To meet the same emission standards (IMO Tier III) as the Ambassador ships, Renaissance will receive engine upgrades in January 2025 which will then allow her visit sea areas where stricter controls are required.

Ambassador plans to increase its fleet to four by the end of 2026 and five ships by 2028.

=== Ambassador Kreuzfahrten and Ambella ===
On 22 September 2026, Ambassador announced Oceania Cruises's Sirena would join the fleet in 2028 as Ambella. The ship will sail under the newly established Ambassador Kreuzfahrten, sailing for the German market during the summer months, and alternating with Semester at Sea, which will use the ship during the winter months. She is expected to sail from Bremerhaven and Kiel.

== Ships ==
=== Current fleet (Ambassador Group) ===
Ship	Built	In service for Ambassador	Tonnage	Flag	Target market	Notes	Home port	Image
Ambience	1991	2022	70,285 GT	Bahamas	United Kingdom	Sold by P&O Cruises Australia to Ocean Builders and renamed Satoshi with plans to convert her into a floating hotel in Panama. Sold to newly formed Ambassador Cruise Line and announced as the line's flagship in May 2021. She sailed on her maiden cruise on 20 April 2022.	London Tilbury	
Ambition	1999	2023	48,123 GT	Bahamas	United Kingdom	Purchased from Aida Cruises. Sailed on her maiden cruise on 12 May 2023.	London Tilbury	
Ambassador Croisières
Renaissance	1995	2025	55,575 GT	Bermuda	France	Operates for Ambassador Cruise Line under Ambassador Croisières for the French market.	Le Havre and Marseille	
Ambassador Kreuzfahrten
Ambella	1999	2028	30,277 GT	TBA	Germany	Will operate for Ambassador Cruise Line under Ambassador Kreuzfahrten for the German market during the summer, will sail for Semester at Sea during the winter	Bremerhaven and Kiel	
