= MS Ambition =

Cruise ship operated by Ambassador Cruise Line

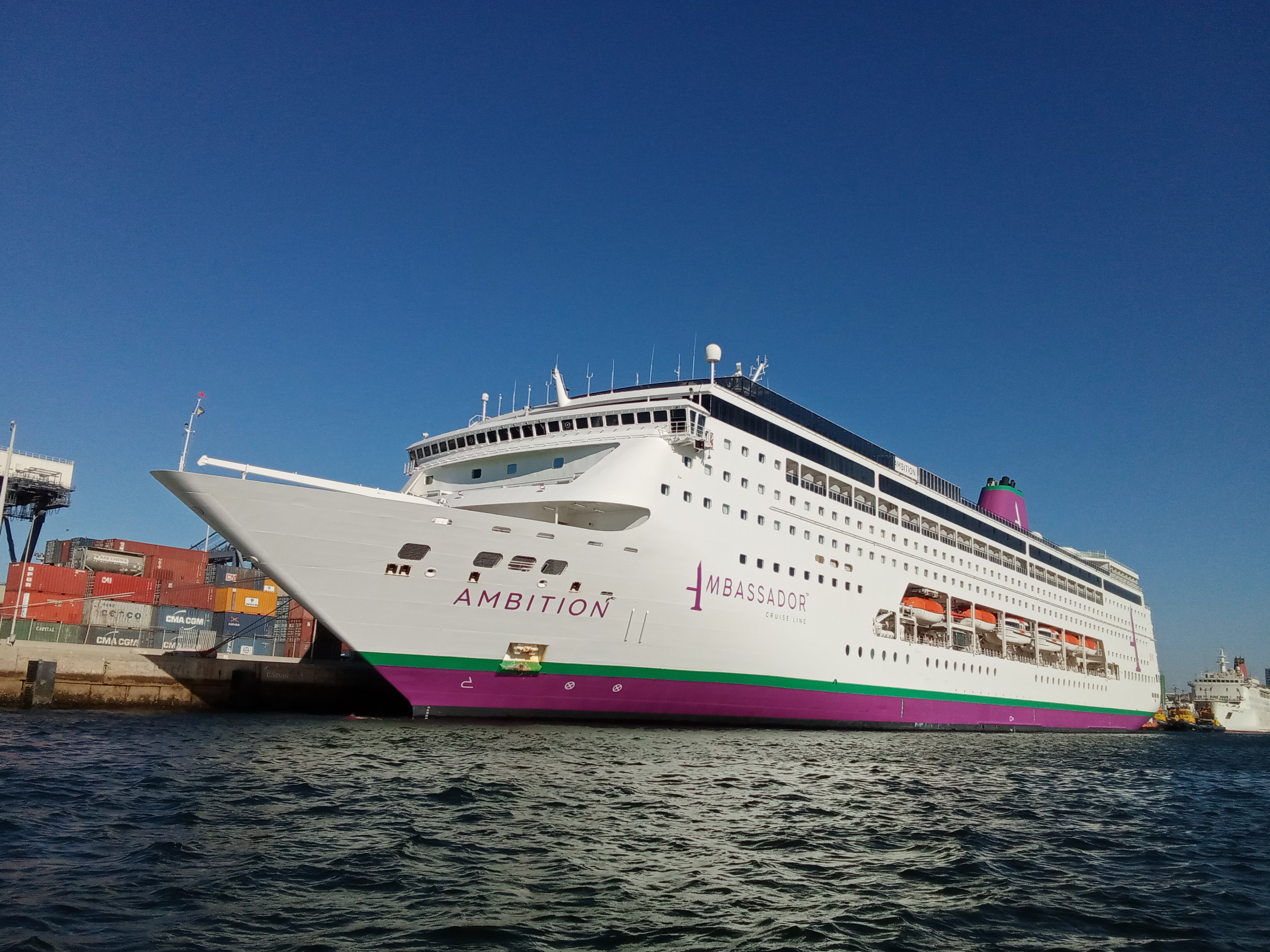
- MS Ambition at Casablanca in 2023

History
- Name: 1999–2003: Mistral; 2003–2013: Grand Mistral; 2013–2019: Costa neoRiviera; 2019–2022: AIDAmira; 2022–present: Ambition
- Operator: 1999–2003: Festival Cruises; 2003–2013: Iberocruceros; 2013–2019: Costa Crociere; 2019–2022: AIDA Cruises; 2022–present: Ambassador Cruise Line
- Port of registry: (France) Mata Utu; (Marshall Islands) Majuro; (Italy) Genoa; (Portugal) Madeira; (Italy) Genoa; (The Bahamas) Nassau
- Ordered: 1996
- Builder: Chantiers de l'Atlantique; Saint-Nazaire, France
- Yard number: J31
- Launched: 2 January 1999
- Christened: 25 June 1999
- Maiden voyage: 17 July 1999
- In service: 1999–present
- Identification: Call sign: C6FL6; IMO number: 9172777; MMSI number: 311001141
- Status: In service

General characteristics
- Class & type: Mistral-class cruise ship
- Tonnage: 48,200 GT
- Length: 216 m (708 ft 8 in)
- Beam: 28.8 m (94 ft 6 in)
- Depth: 6.8 m (22 ft 4 in)
- Decks: 8 passenger decks
- Installed power: emissions standard IMO Tier III
- Speed: 19.5 knots (36.1 km/h; 22.4 mph)
- Capacity: 1,248 passengers (double occupancy) 1,727 passengers (maximum capacity)
- Crew: 670
- Notes: When docked can plugin to external power and turn-off engines

MS Ambition is a cruise ship operated by Ambassador Cruise Line. Completed in France as Mistral for Festival Cruises in 1999, she sailed between 2005 and 2019 as Grand Mistral with Ibero Cruises and Costa neoRiviera with Costa Cruises. The ship was in service as AIDAmira with AIDA Cruises, a subsidiary of Carnival Corporation & plc, until her sale in 2022 to Ambassador Cruise Line, who renamed her Ambition, commencing sailing in May 2023.

== History ==
=== Mistral ===
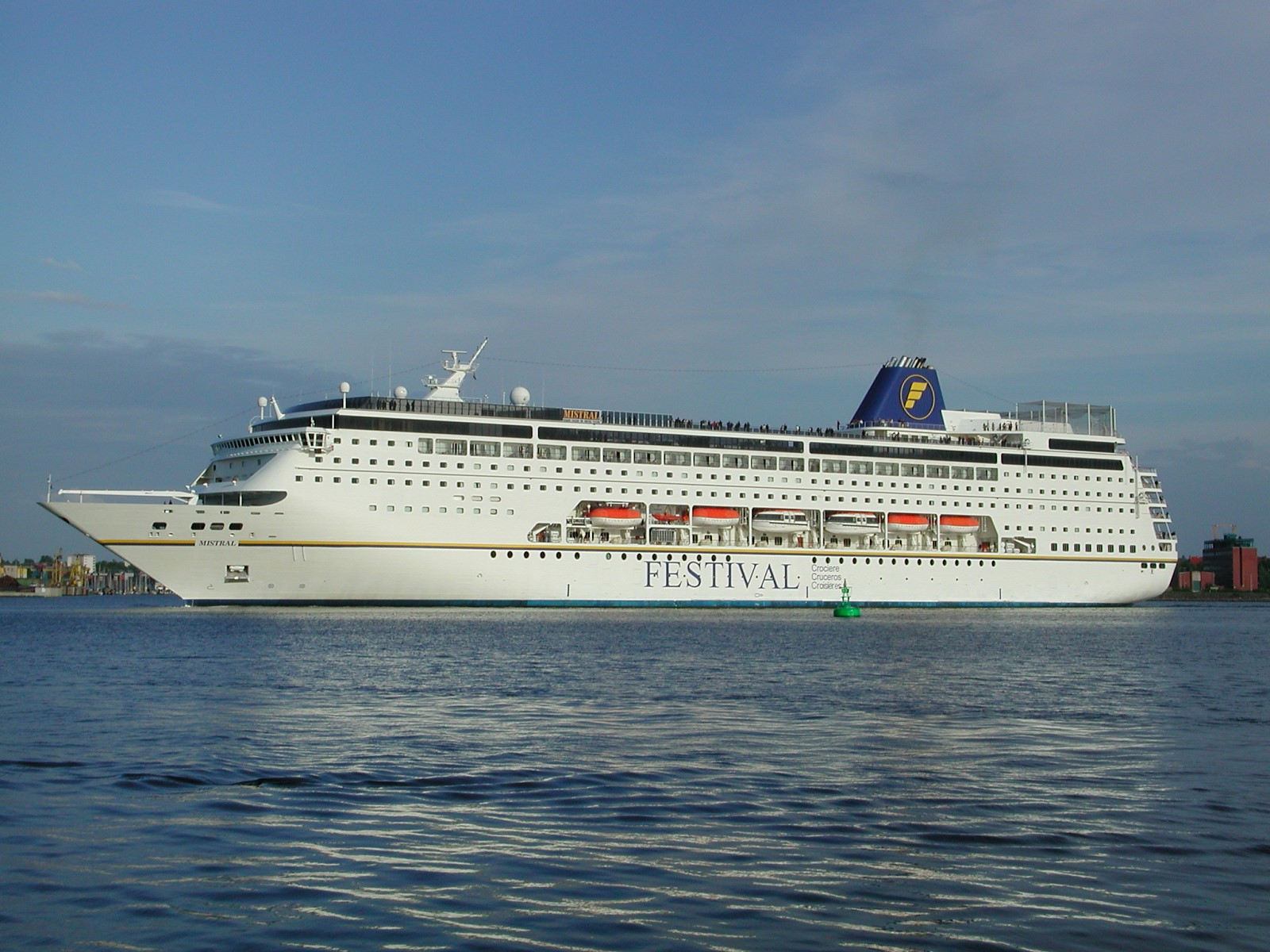
Mistral in Kiel Harbour, May 2003

The ship was originally ordered by Renaissance Cruises in mid 1996, but the order was later withdrawn. The yard and bankers together held ownership of the ship through a company called Auxiliaire Maritime. During construction at Chantiers de l'Atlantique, the order was taken over by Festival Cruises, which would receive its first new-build vessel.

Festival Cruises chartered the ship for the first 12 years, with the option to purchase the ship after the first six years. The ship was floated out on 2 January 1999 from the shipyard and was christened on 25 June 1999 by Claude Deschamps, wife of French football player Didier Deschamps. Mistral sailed on her maiden voyage on 17 July 1999, a seven-day cruise from Genoa to the Greek islands. She was deployed to Guadeloupe in the Caribbean after her inaugural Mediterranean season and later operated primarily from Cuba. Festival Cruises collapsed in 2004 and most of the company's fleet, including Mistral, was sold off.

=== Grand Mistral ===
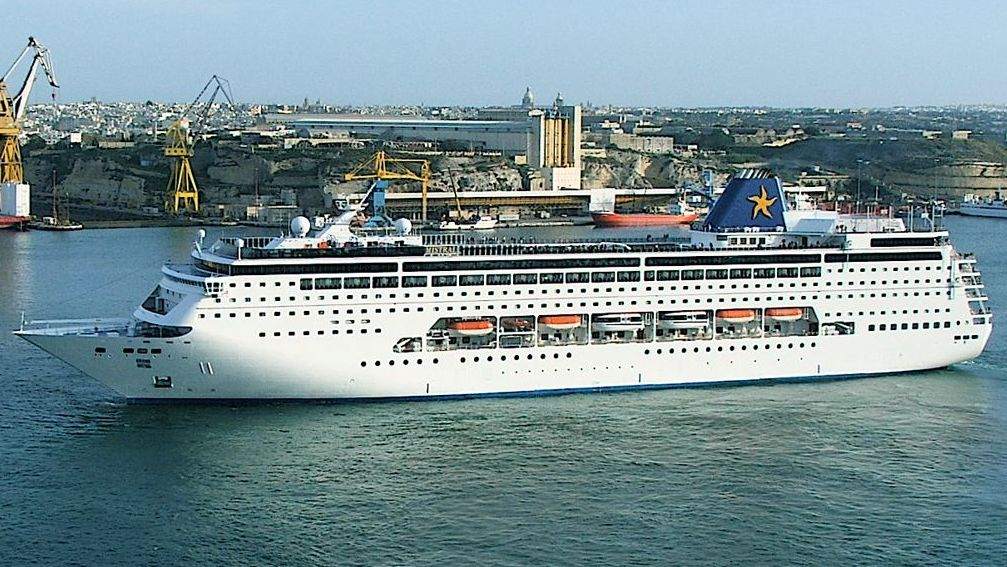
Grand Mistral in Malta, 2006

Mistral was initially sold back to Alstom Group, parent of her builders, and chartered to Viajes Iberojet and operated by Ibero Cruises, having been marketed as Iberostar Mistral. Mistral was officially sold to Iberojet at an auction and subsequently renamed Grand Mistral, debuting for the cruise line on 30 May 2005.

In 2007, Carnival Corporation & plc formed a joint venture with Orizonia Corporation under the latter's Iberojet Cruceros brand, with Carnival owning 75% and Orizonia owning 25% of the company. With this, Grand Mistral would now be owned and operated by the new joint venture company.

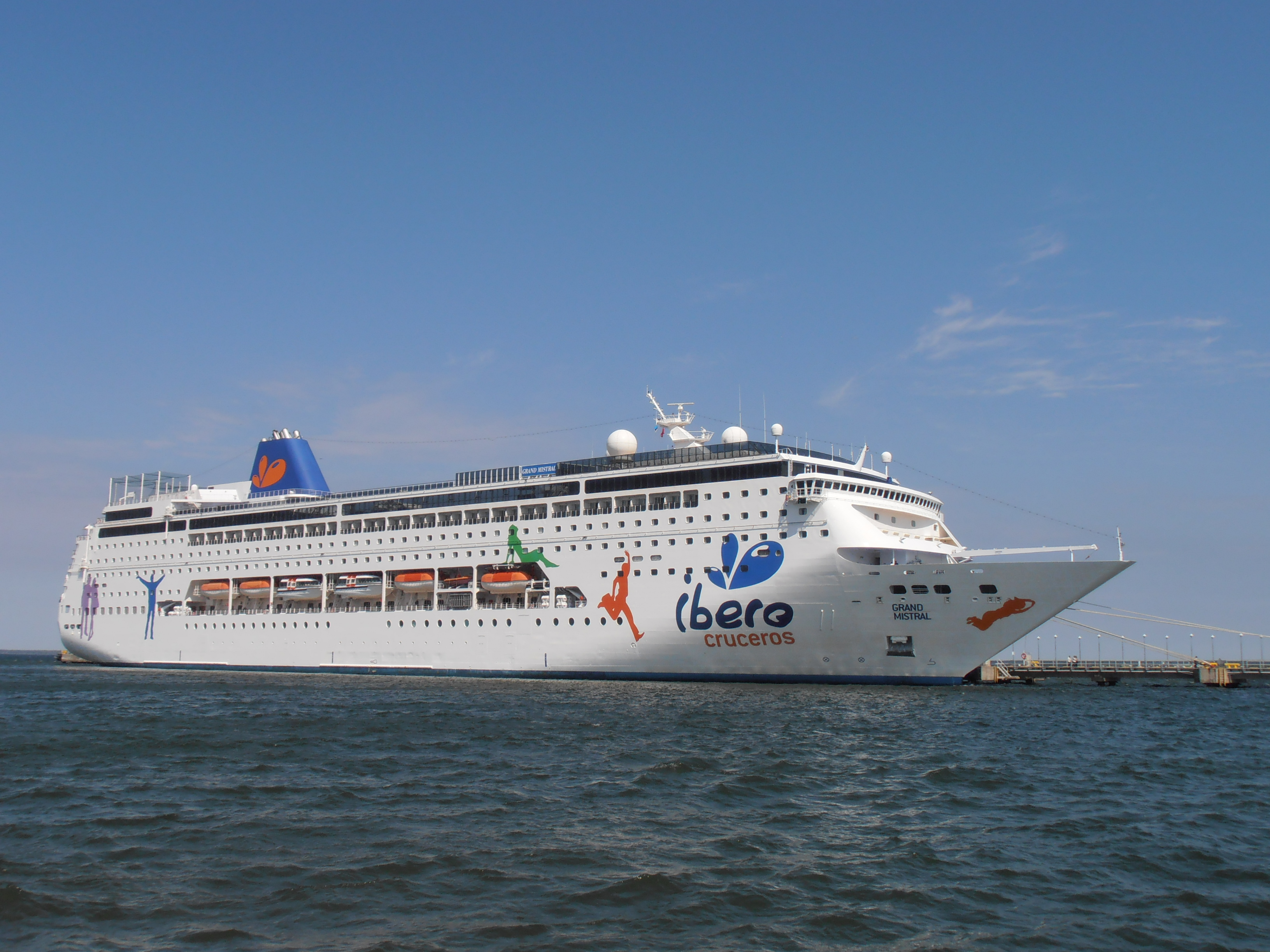
Grand Mistral with new livery, at Tallinn on 22 May 2012

In August 2013, it was announced that Grand Mistral would be transferred to Costa Cruises in November, and her intended South American itineraries from Santos, Brazil would be cancelled.

=== Costa neoRiviera ===
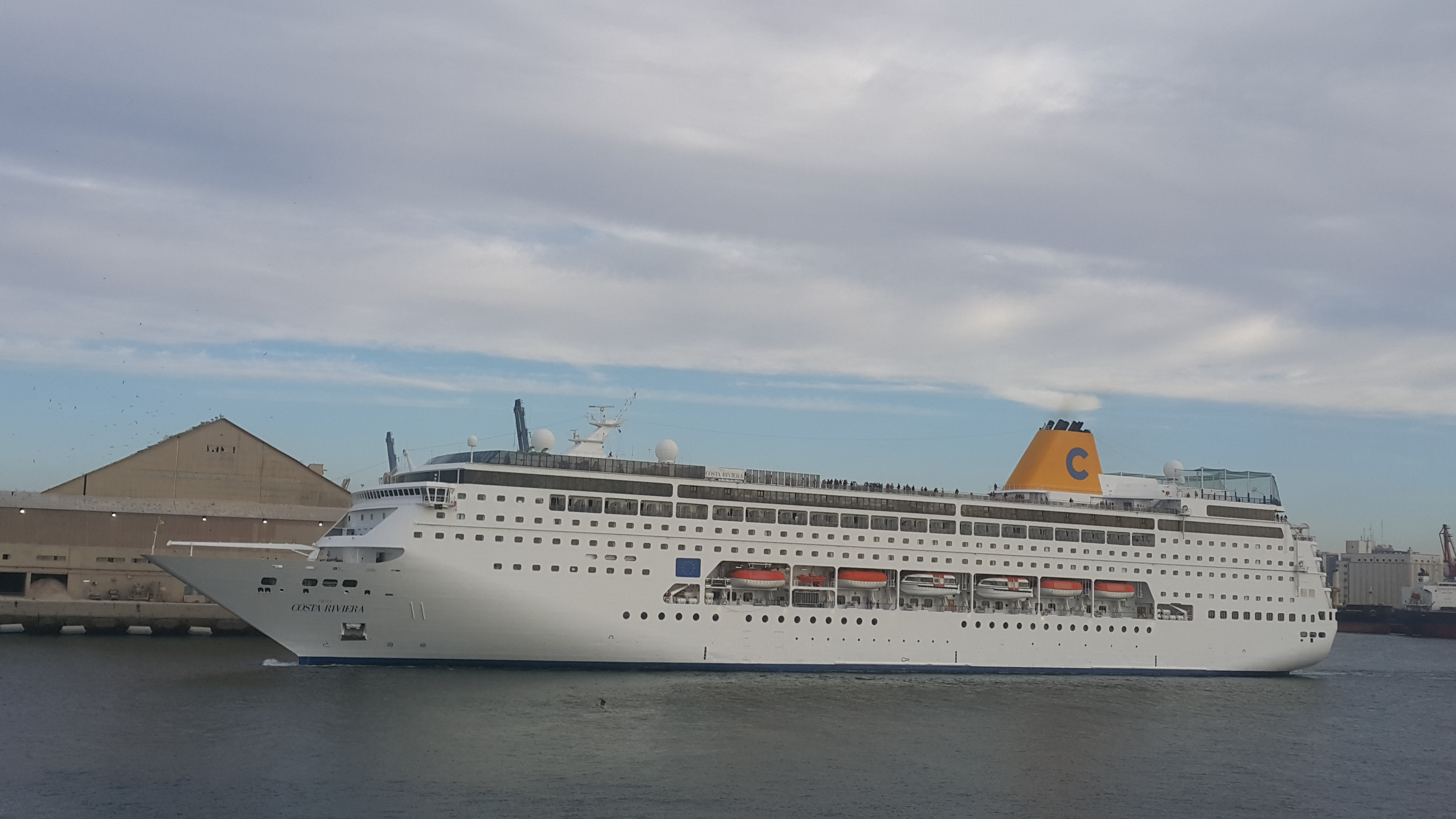
Costa neoRiviera at Casablanca, 2019

In September 2013, Costa Cruises announced that the transferred ship, which would be renamed Costa neoRiviera, would take a central role in launching a new sub-product that would focus on smaller ships with longer port calls, more overnights, and new exotic locales among the offered itineraries. In October 2013, Costa revealed that she would be based in Dubai, with her debut set for 24 November 2013. The company reportedly invested €10 million into transforming the ship for integration into its fleet.

Costa neoRiviera left Costa's fleet in October 2019 after it was announced on 25 May 2018 that the ship would be transferred to sister brand, AIDA Cruises.

=== AIDAmira ===
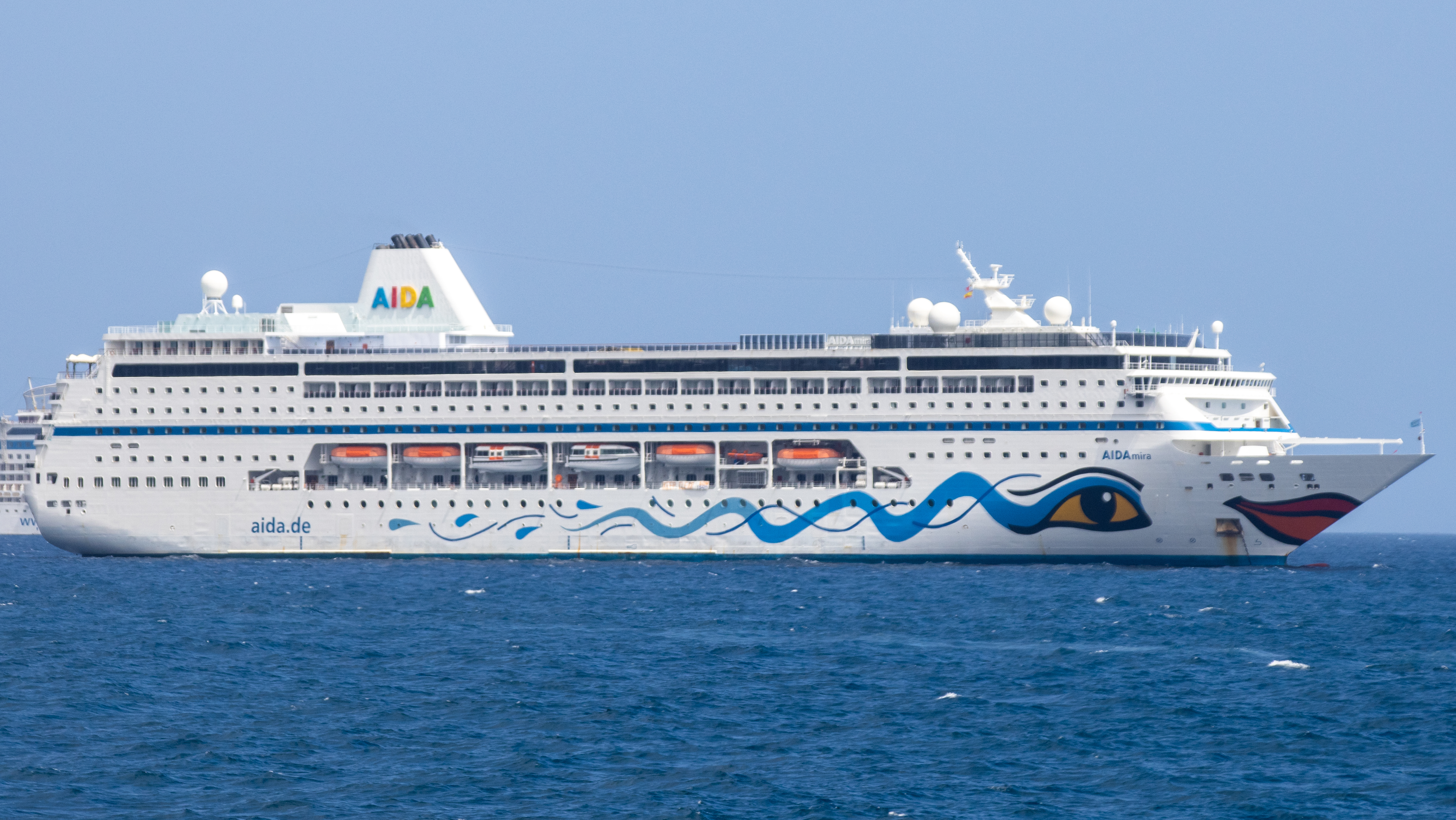
AIDAmira at Tenerife in 2021

Costa neoRiviera entered dry dock at the San Giorgio del Porto shipyard in Genoa on 30 October 2019 for a $55 million transformation to integrate her into the AIDA fleet. She departed the shipyard on 28 November 2019 and arrived in Palma de Mallorca on 29 November 2019 for her christening. AIDAmira was officially christened by Franziska Knuppe on 30 November 2019 in Palma de Mallorca.

AIDAmira was the fourth ship to be in AIDA's "AIDA Selection" program, along with AIDAaura, AIDAcara, and AIDAvita, utilizing the fleet's smaller ships to perform longer itineraries calling in exotic locales. Her inaugural cruise was scheduled to leave on 4 December 2019 to Sète and Barcelona, but was cancelled at the last minute due to continued renovations requiring her to stay in Palma de Mallorca until 4 December. The ship left for her maiden season in South Africa, offering 14-day cruises from Cape Town.

In March 2020, during the COVID-19 pandemic, six passengers were quarantined on AIDAmira, after they had flown on a plane with another guest who had later tested positive for COVID-19. Ultimately, more than 1,700 passengers were held, pending their test results, while the ship was docked at Cape Town. By 19 March, all tests returned negative, and passengers were allowed to disembark. She was scheduled to return to the Mediterranean from May to September 2020, sailing within the Eastern Mediterranean region from Corfu, but the pandemic caused AIDA to suspend its operations through the summer.

After being laid up since 2020, AIDA Cruises sold the ship in January 2022 to Ambassador Cruise Line.

=== Ambition ===
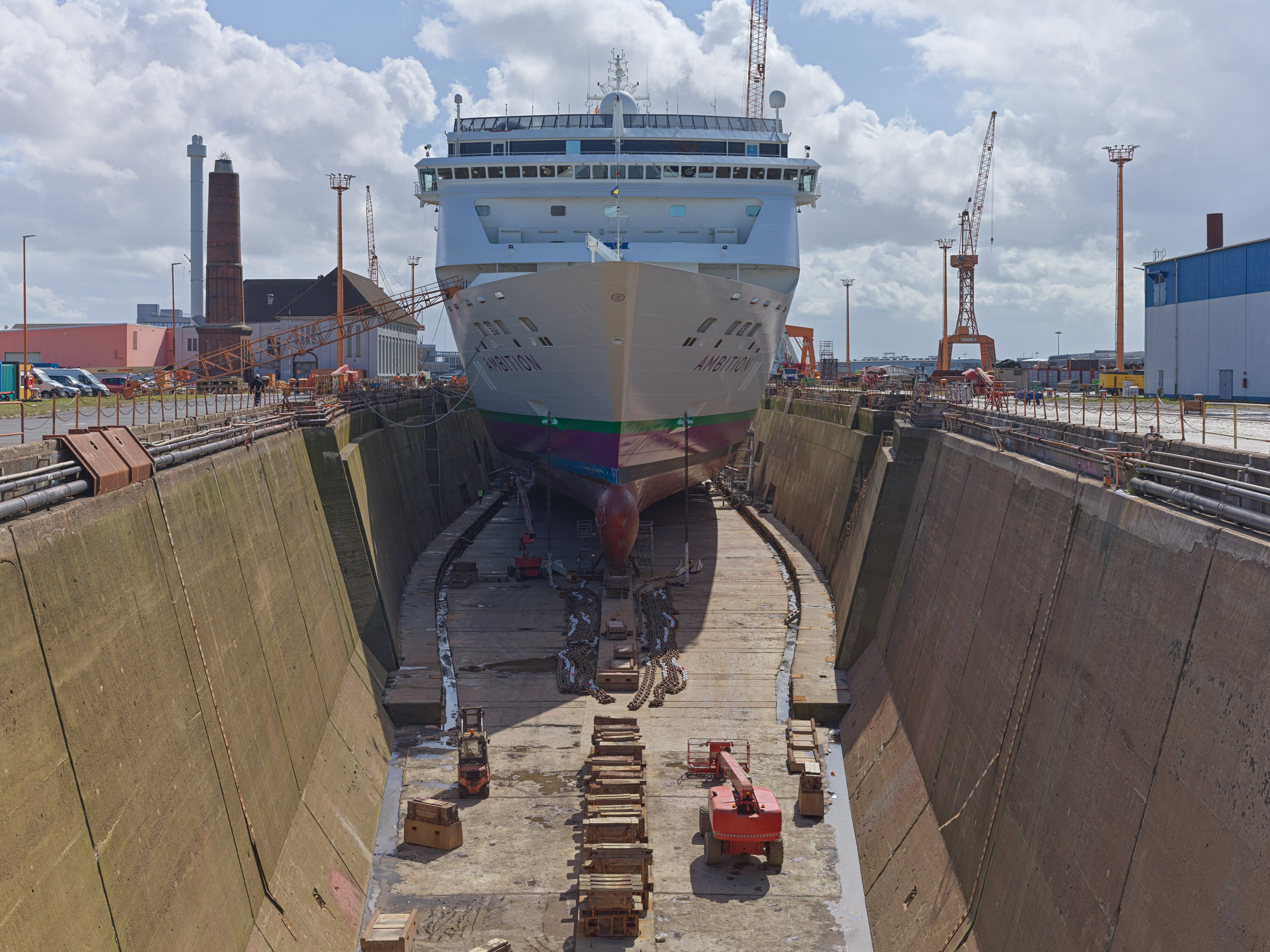
Ambition in drydock in April 2023

Ambassador Cruise Line renamed the ship Ambition and in April 2022 sent her to Bar, Montenegro to await an extensive refit prior to commencing service in March 2023. In September 2022, the ship began a six-month charter to the Scottish Government to provide accommodation on the River Clyde in Glasgow for refugees from the Russian invasion of Ukraine, delaying commencement of her cruise program.

In April 2023, a four-week refit took place at the Lloyd Werft in Bremerhaven, Germany. Ambition was upgraded to comply with the International Maritime Organization's Tier III emission standards, which required a reduction in the ship's production of nitrogen oxide. The dock work at Lloyd Werft also included maintenance work on the propulsion units, rudders and stabilizers, as well as a new coat of paint in the shipping company's colors. Ambition left Bremerhaven on 8 May 2023 before travelling to Port of Tyne in Newcastle on 11 May for the naming ceremony. Former sailing champion and double Olympic Gold medalist Shirley Robertson christened and was named godmother of the ship. The first stop on the ship's maiden voyage from Newcastle was at Dundee, Robertson's birthplace.
