= MS Jubilee =

Scrapped cruise ship

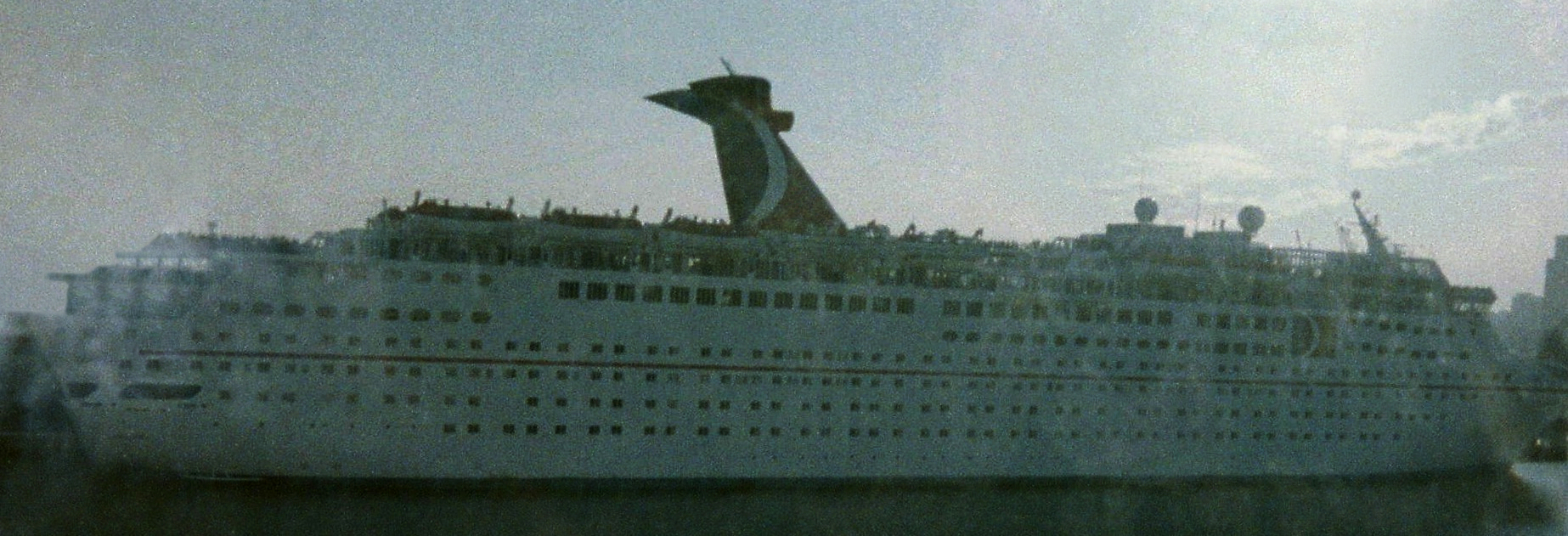
- Jubilee at Miami, Florida in 2000

History
- Name: Jubilee (1986–2004); Pacific Sun (2004–2012); Henna (2012–2017); Hen (2017)
- Owner: 1986–1993: Carnival Cruise Line; 1993–2011: Carnival Corporation & plc; 2011-2016: Triton International Investment Co
- Operator: 1986–2004: Carnival Cruise Lines; 2004–2012: P&O Cruises Australia; 2012–2015: HNA Tourism Cruise
- Port of registry: 1986–1996: Monrovia, Liberia; 1996–2000: Panama, Panama; 2000–2007: Nassau, Bahamas; 2007–2010: London, United Kingdom; 2010–2017: Valletta, Malta
- Builder: Kockums Varv, Malmö, Sweden
- Cost: US$134 million
- Yard number: 596
- Launched: 26 October 1985
- Completed: 1986
- Acquired: June 1986
- Maiden voyage: 6 July 1986
- In service: 1986–2016
- Out of service: 6 June 2016
- Identification: Call sign: 9HA2479; IMO number: 8314122; MMSI number: 248708000
- Fate: Scrapped at Alang, India in 2017.

General characteristics
- Class & type: Holiday-class cruise ship
- Tonnage: 47,262 GT; 6,405 DWT
- Length: 223.4 m (732 ft 11 in)
- Beam: 28.2 m (92 ft 6 in)
- Draft: 7.5 m (24 ft 7 in)
- Decks: 9 passenger decks
- Installed power: Two 7-cylinder Sulzer diesel engines; 23,520 kW (combined)
- Propulsion: Two propellers
- Speed: 21.7 knots (40.2 km/h; 25.0 mph)
- Capacity: 1,486 passengers
- Crew: 670

MS Jubilee (also known as Pacific Sun and Henna) was a cruise ship that was originally built for Carnival Cruise Line. She was the second of three ships to be built for Carnival's Holiday class. She was last owned by the Chinese company HNA Cruise Company, Limited, for service in the West Pacific region. The ship was retired and scrapped in 2017.

== History ==
=== Carnival Cruise Line ===
Jubilee was built in 1986 by Kockums Varv, Malmö, Sweden, for Carnival Cruise Line, along with near-sister ship Celebration. The other near-sister ship of the class, Holiday, was built earlier by Aalborg Værft in Aalborg, Denmark.

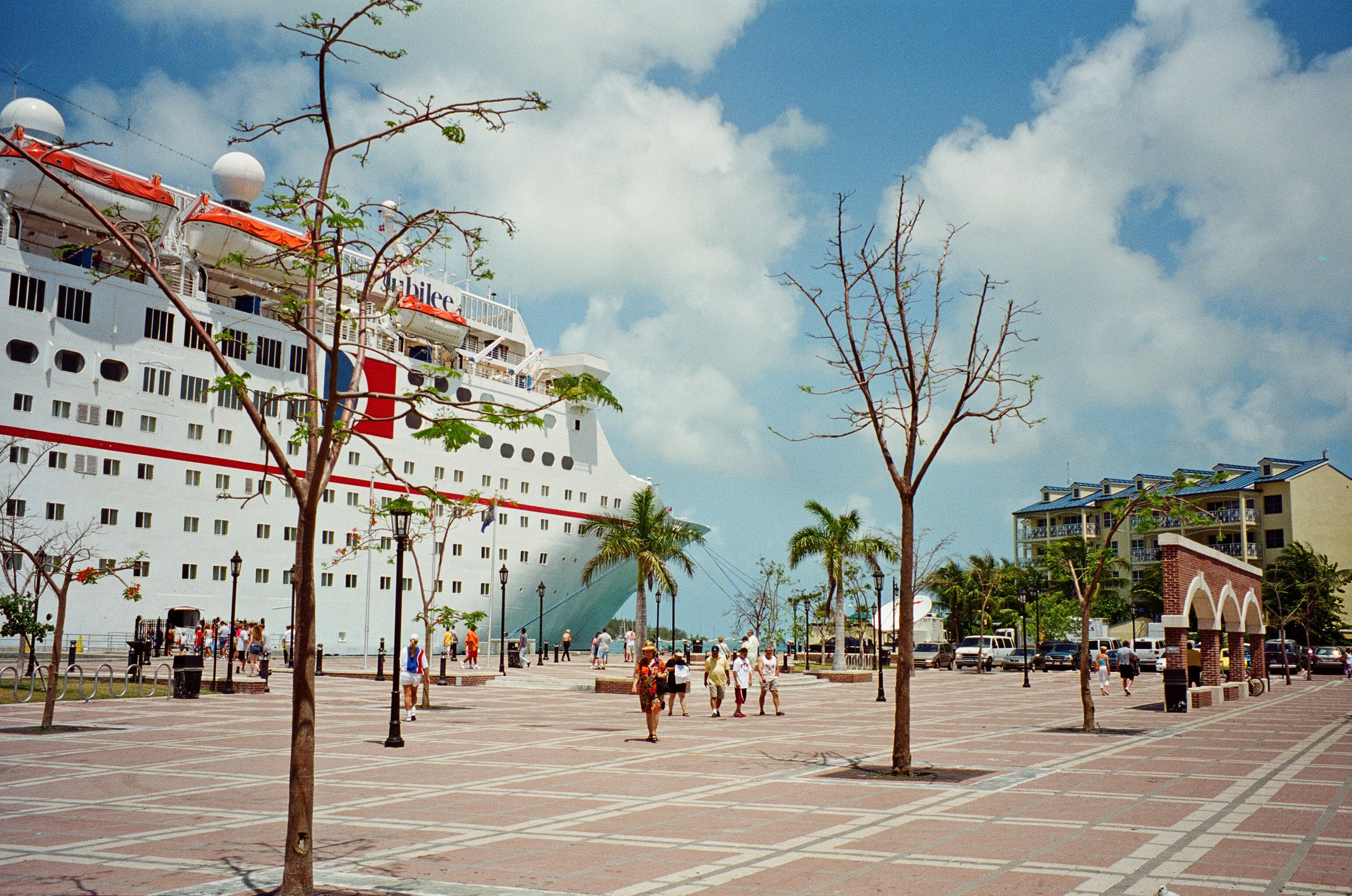
MS Jubilee at Key West

For many years, Jubilee sailed from Los Angeles to the Mexican Riviera, including Ensenada, Puerto Vallarta, Cabo San Lucas and Mazatlan. In 1989, she sailed from Vancouver to Alaska and Hawaii, and in later years, from Miami to the Caribbean and Miami to San Diego via the Panama Canal. Her final homeport was Jacksonville, Florida. The last passenger cruise with Carnival took place on August 26, 2004, to Nassau and Freeport, Bahamas.

=== P&O Cruises ===
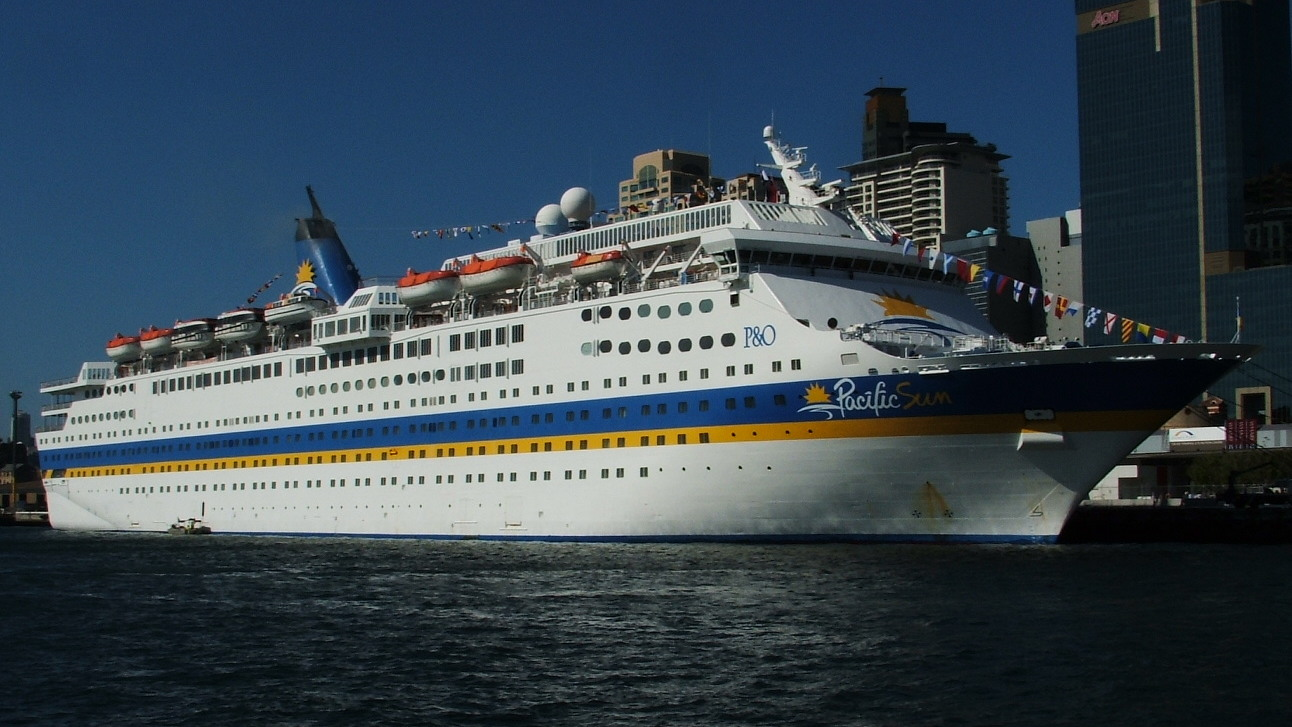
MS Pacific Sun docked at Darling Harbour, Sydney, Australia

In 2004, the vessel was transferred to P&O Cruises Australia and renamed Pacific Sun. She arrived in Australia on 9 November 2004 and began year-round cruises from Sydney to the South Pacific and Tropical North Queensland. From late 2007, she was based in Brisbane and was then the largest year-round liner to be based in Queensland. After receiving a multimillion-dollar makeover, she sailed in all-white colours, like P&O's other ships, along with new amenities. Pacific Sun was the only ship of three siblings (with Grand Celebration and Grand Holiday) whose funnel was changed upon leaving Carnival Cruise Lines; her sister's funnels were simply repainted, while Sun had both Carnival's iconic wings and a part of its shielding removed. Carnival's first newbuilt ship, the slightly older Tropicale (now MS Ocean Dream), also had her Carnival funnel replaced with Costa Cruises's round stove-pipe funnel, which she retained until the end of her career.

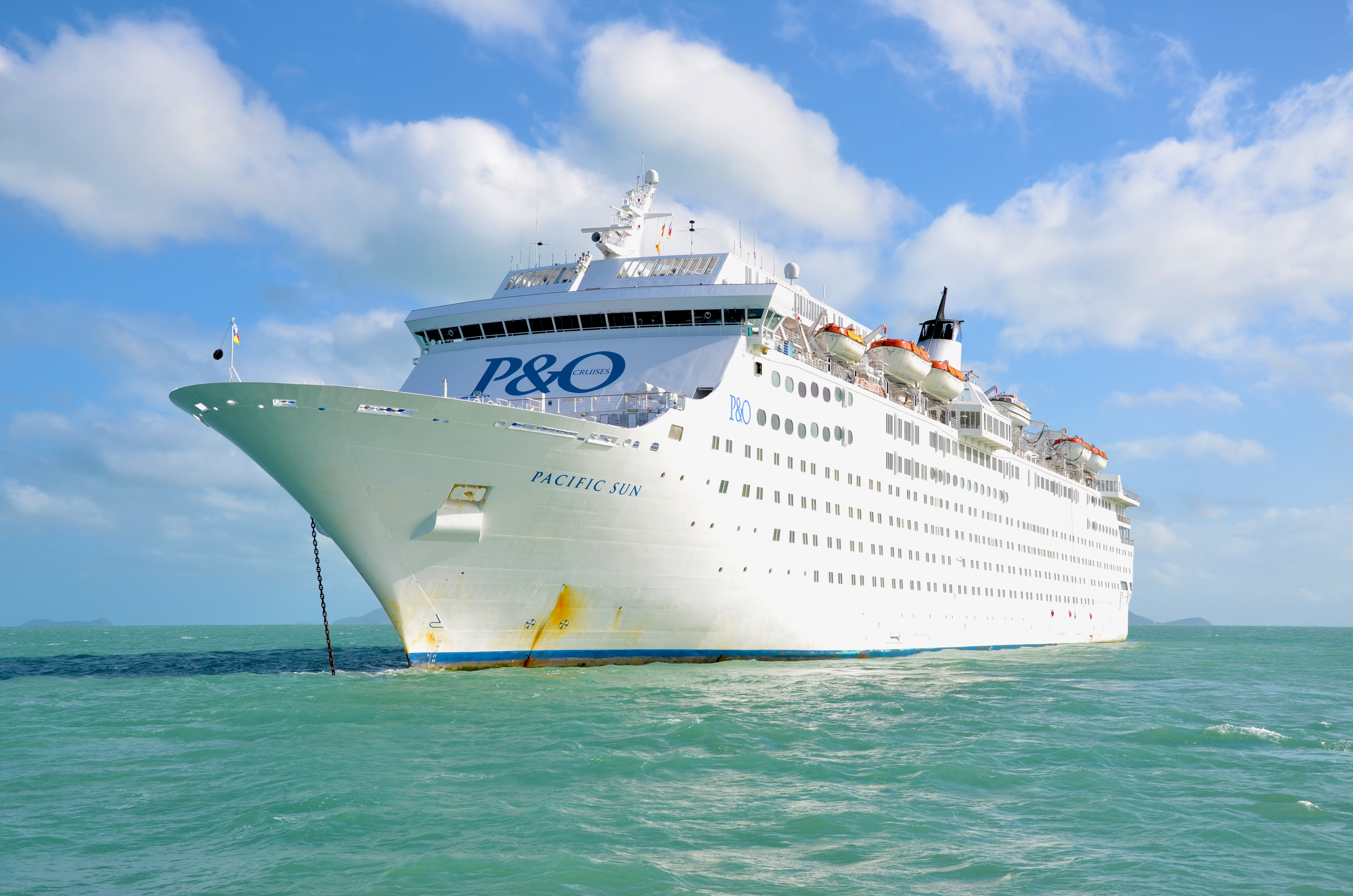
MS Pacific Sun anchored off Airlie Beach in the Whitsunday Islands in May 2011

In late July 2008, 42 passengers were injured in a storm. The event became widely known when video footage was posted on the internet two years later.

On 18 December 2011, P&O announced that Pacific Sun would leave its fleet in July 2012. Her farewell cruise was an 8-day roundtrip from Portside Wharf in Brisbane, stopping at Nouméa, Lifou, in New Caledonia, and Port Vila, Vanuatu, with three days at sea. Pacific Sun had completed between 314 and 332 cruises, with 2,707 nights at sea and an estimated 586,000 passengers carried.

=== HNA Cruises ===
The ship was then sold to Chinese interests under the newly formed cruise line, HNA Cruises. On 13 September 2012, the ship was renamed Henna. The ship made her maiden voyage under Chinese ownership on 26 January 2013 from Sanya to Vietnam. At that time, the ship was the first luxury cruise liner in mainland China at over 47,000 tons with 739 passenger cabins and a maximum passenger capacity of 1,965. She had nine suites, 432 ocean-view staterooms, and 298 interior staterooms. During its operation with HNA Cruises, the ship sailed to locations in Vietnam and in South Korea.

In September 2013 the ship was detained at the South Korean island of Jeju after Chinese shipping service company Jiangsu Shagang International applied for a seizure. After several days stuck on board, the 1,659 passengers were flown home via HNA Group's China Hainan Airlines.

In November 2015, HNA shut down its cruise ship operation after three years of losses in the region. Since the Henna's last cruise with HNA, she was laid up and was placed for sale for US$35 million.

=== Demise ===
With there being no interested buyers, Henna was sold for scrapping in Alang, India. She was photographed there, renamed as the Hen, on 1 May 2017. By late June, scrapping began and was complete by the end of 2017.
