= MS Celebration =

Cruise ship

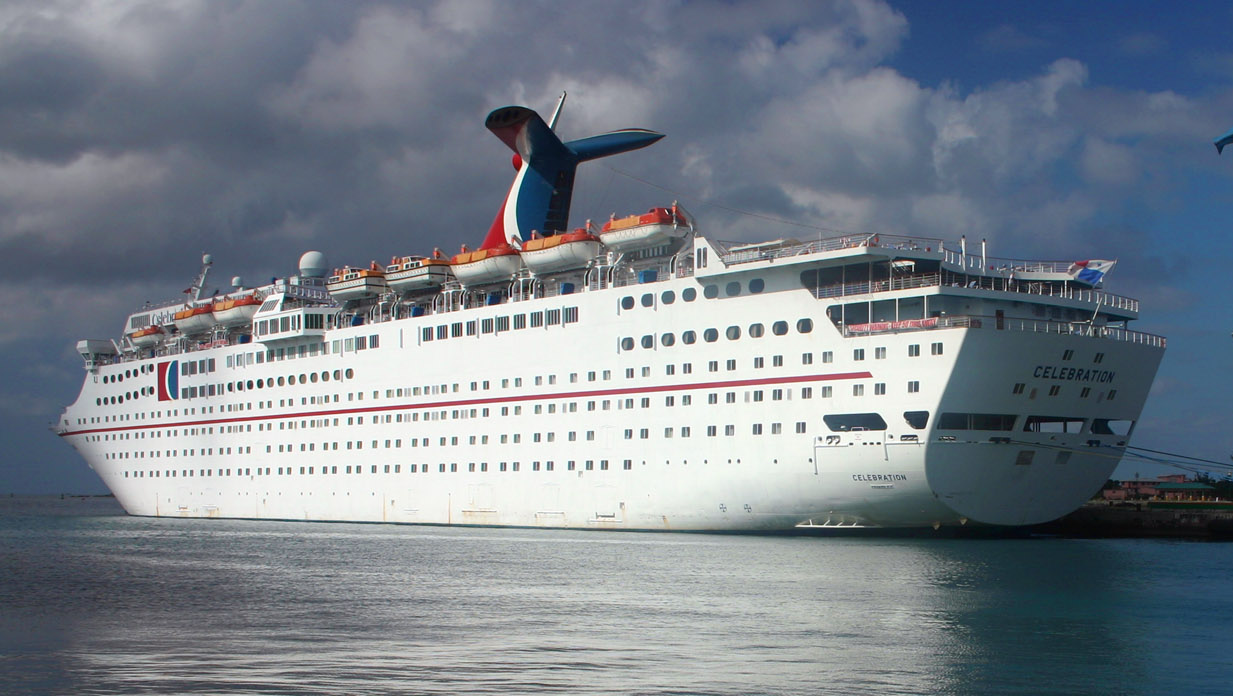
- Celebration in 2005 docked in Nassau

History
- Name: 1987–2008: Celebration; 2008–2014: Grand Celebration; 2014–2015: Costa Celebration; 2015–2020: Grand Celebration; 2020–2021: Grand
- Owner: 1987–2014: Carnival Corporation & plc; 2014–2020: Bahamas Paradise Cruise Line
- Operator: 1987–2008: Carnival Cruise Lines; 2008–2014: Ibero Cruises; 2014: Costa Cruises; 2014–2020: Bahamas Paradise Cruise Line
- Port of registry: 1987–2000: Monrovia, Liberia; 2000–2008: Panama City, Panama; 2008–2014: Madeira, (Portugal); 2014–2020: Nassau, (The Bahamas); 2020–2021: Saint Kitts and Nevis,
- Builder: Kockums Varv, Malmö, Sweden
- Cost: US$130 million
- Yard number: 597
- Launched: 9 August 1986
- Completed: 1987
- Acquired: February 1987
- Maiden voyage: 14 March 1987
- In service: 1987–2020
- Out of service: March 2020
- Identification: Call sign V4FY4; IMO number: 8314134; MMSI number: 255803270
- Fate: Scrapped at Alang, India in 2021

General characteristics
- Class & type: Holiday-class cruise ship
- Tonnage: 47,262 GT; 6,405 DWT
- Length: 223.37 m (732 ft 10 in)
- Beam: 28.20 m (92 ft 6 in)
- Draught: 7.75 m (25 ft 5 in)
- Decks: 10 (passenger accessible)
- Installed power: 2 × 7-cylinder Sulzer diesel engines; combined 23,510 kW (31,530 hp)
- Propulsion: 2 propellers
- Speed: 21.7 knots (40.2 km/h; 25.0 mph)
- Capacity: 1,496 passengers
- Crew: 670

MS Celebration (also known as Grand Celebration) was a cruise ship originally built for Carnival Cruise Line. She was the last of three ships to be built in Carnival's Holiday class of cruise ships. She last sailed for Bahamas Paradise Cruise Line between 2015 and 2020.

The Grand Celebration was sold for scrap in 2020 with her sister ship, Holiday, precipitated in part by the COVID-19 pandemic. A third sister ship, Jubilee, was last operated by HNA Tourism. Jubilee was retired and scrapped in 2017.

== History ==
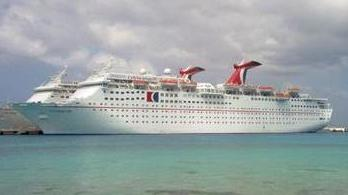
Celebration (Carnival Cruise Line) docked in Cozumel with her sister ship Holiday, March 2004

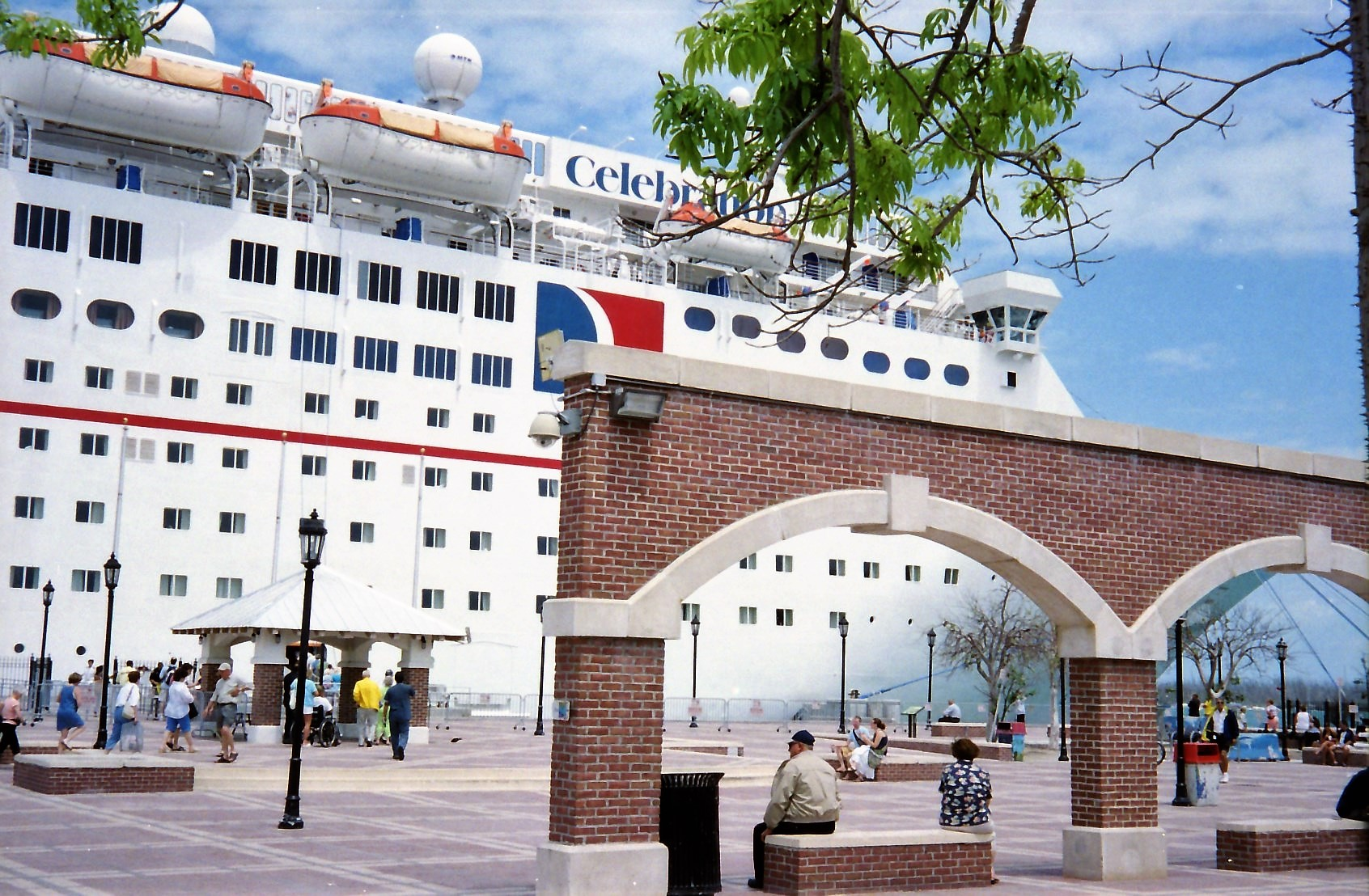
Celebration docked in Key West, Florida, May 2006

The ship was built as the Celebration in 1986 by Kockums Varv in Malmö, Sweden for Carnival Cruise Lines. Celebration began operating for Carnival on 14 March 1987.

On the morning of 10 February 1989, Celebration collided with the Cuban freighter Captain San Luis, causing the latter to break in half and sink in 13 minutes. Three crew members of the Captain San Luis, including her captain, were reported missing and presumed dead. The freighter was hauling cement at the time of the collision and had been experiencing electrical problems which left the ship without lights, navigational equipment, or steering. Celebration remained on-site, rescuing 42 survivors and transferring them to Cuban vessels before continuing to Miami.

She remained in their fleet for over 20 years until she was retired in April 2008. She underwent an extensive refit and re-entered service with Carnival's subsidiary, Iberocruceros, as the Grand Celebration in the summer. The refit included new hull artwork and updated interiors.

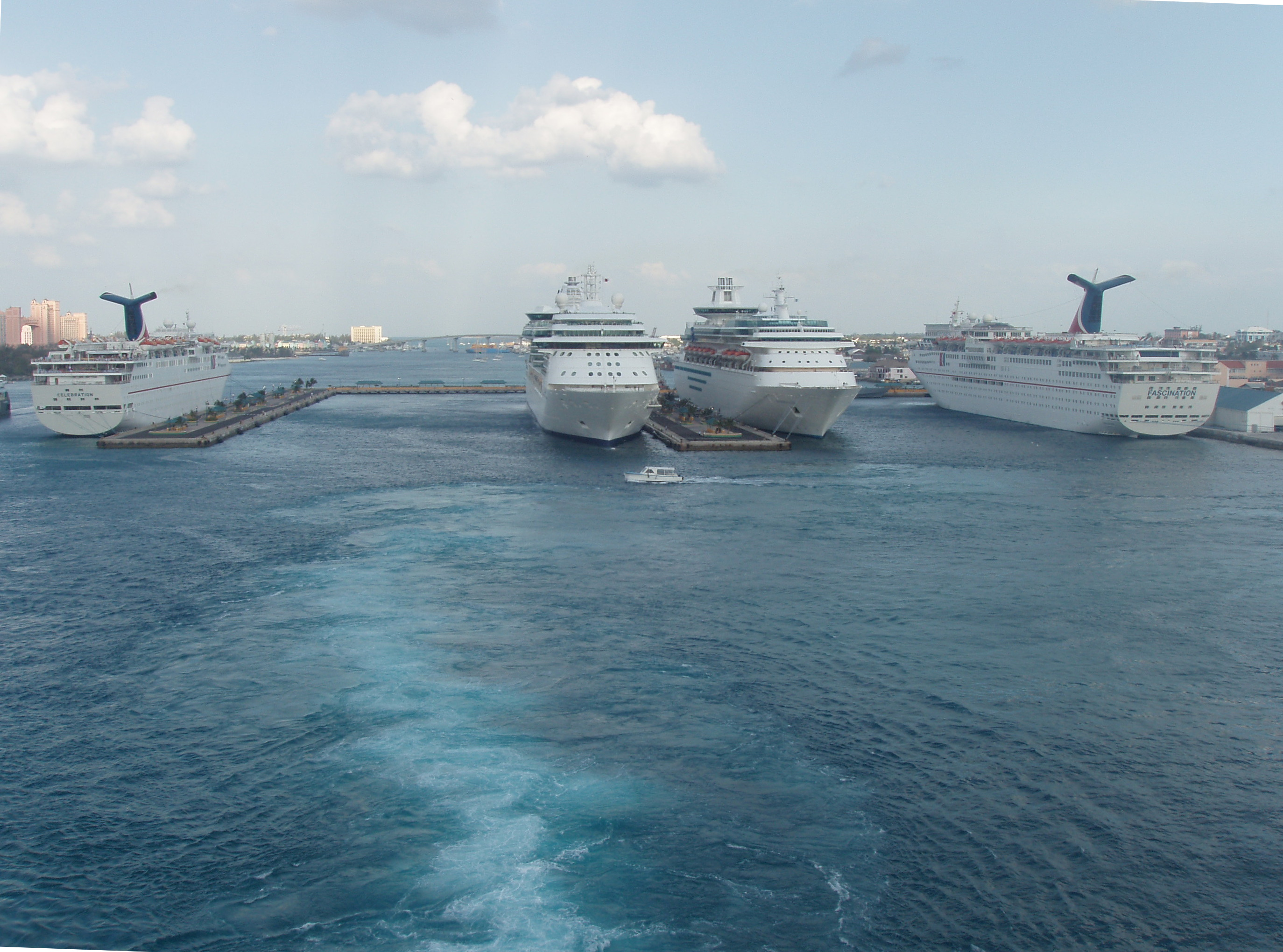
Celebration docked in Nassau, Bahamas with Carnival Fascination & Royal Caribbean Cruise Ships, June 2006

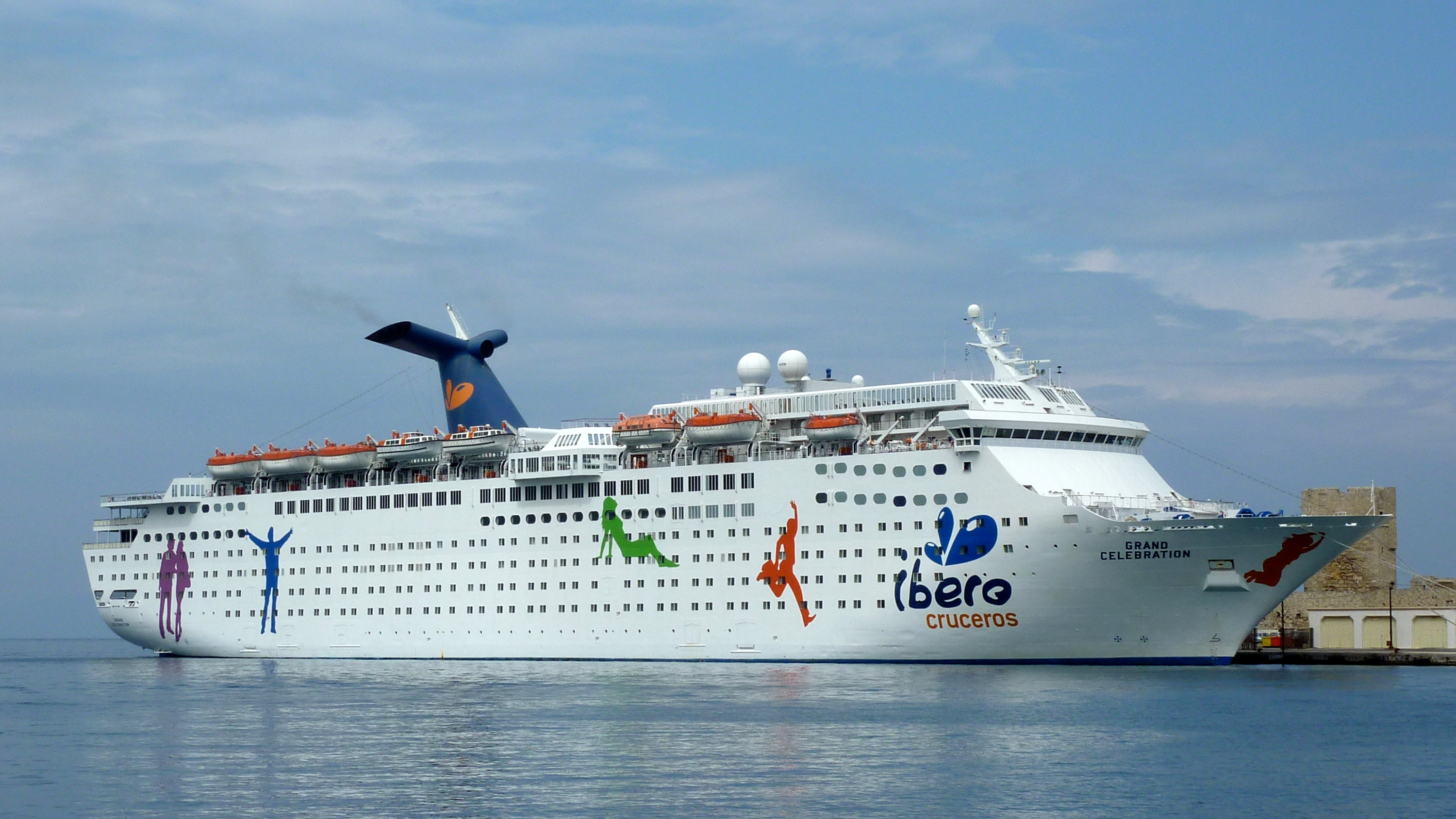
Grand Celebration (Ibero Cruises) at Rhodes, May 2012

In May 2014, as a result of the discontinuation of the Iberocruceros subsidiary, Carnival transferred the ship to another of its lines, Costa Cruises, and renamed Costa Celebration in November 2014. Another refurbishment and refit was performed at that time. On 21 November 2014, on the day before the ship was scheduled to depart on her inaugural voyage, it was announced that the vessel had been sold to an unnamed buyer. The next day, Costa Celebration was removed from Costa's fleet and all bookings were cancelled. Passengers who had booked on Costa Celebration's future cruises were either refunded or re-booked on other ships.

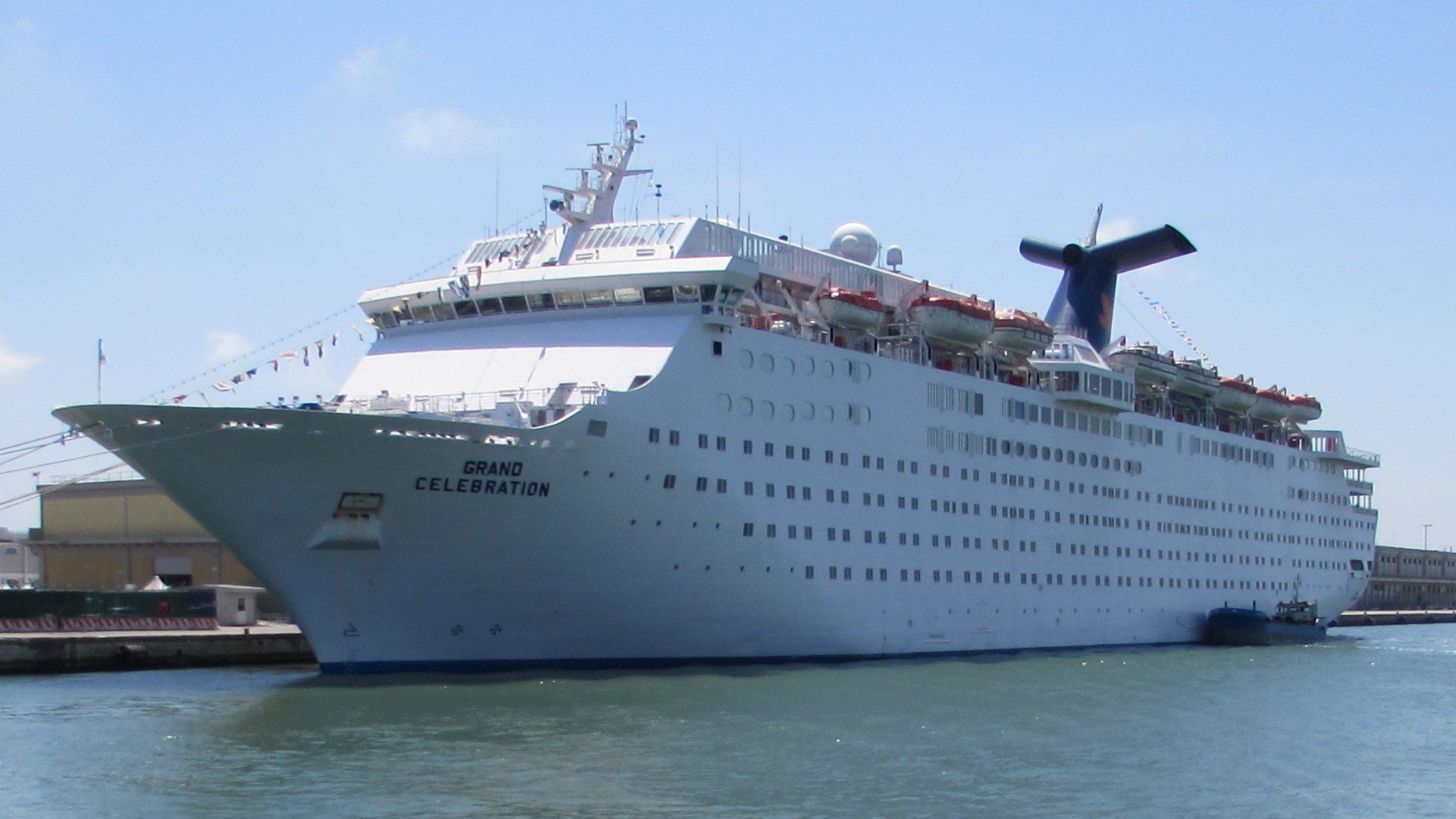
Grand Celebration docked in Venice, Italy, July 2014

On 23 December 2014, it was revealed that the ship had been purchased by the newly formed Bahamas Paradise Cruise Line, who reused the name Grand Celebration and sailed out of the Port of Palm Beach in Riviera Beach, Florida, beginning in February 2015. Bahamas Paradise was formed by former executives from the defunct Celebration Cruise Line that had operated Bahamas Celebration.

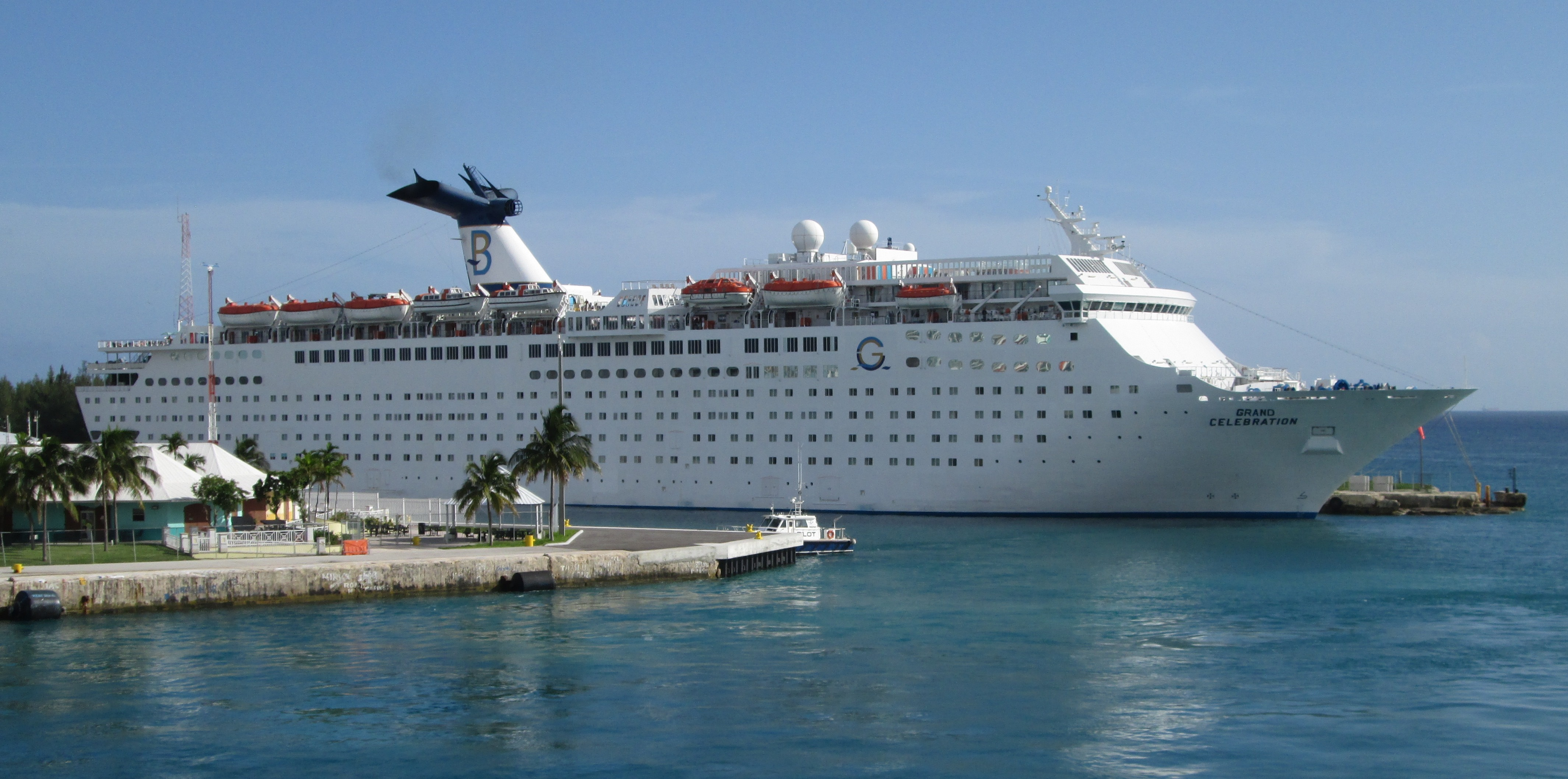
Grand Celebration with original Bahamas Paradise Cruise Line livery at Freeport, Bahamas in 2016

On 6 January 2015, the Grand Celebration arrived at the Port of Palm Beach for refit into Bahamas Paradise livery. During arrival, it was noticed that her Costa Celebration name was painted over with the Grand Celebration name, but the funnel retained the Costa livery.

Grand Celebration departed on 3 February 2015 on her inaugural cruise, two days later than anticipated due to last-minute repairs.

The ship continued to sail for the cruise line until March 2020 when the COVID-19 pandemic halted the cruise line industry. In November 2020, there were reports the ship had been sold to scrap. The company shortly thereafter announced the ship had been sold to an undisclosed buyer. She left Freeport, Bahamas, on 12 November 2020 and arrived at Port Louis Anch, Mauritius, on 30 December 2020 for refueling. She was renamed Grand during refueling and her flag was changed to Saint Kitts and Nevis. The ship later set sail for Bhavnagar, India, near the Alang shipbreaking yard. The ship was beached at Alang for scrapping on 14 January 2021, which commenced on 9 March.
