= Ibero Cruises =

British-American and Spanish-owned former cruise line

- Company type: Subsidiary
- Industry: Transportation
- Founded: 2007
- Defunct: 2014
- Fate: Brand discontinued, merged with Costa Crociere
- Headquarters: Madrid, Spain
- Products: Cruises
- Website: http://www.iberocruceros.es (via the Web Archive)

Ibero Cruises (Spanish: Ibero Cruceros) was a British-American and Spanish owned cruise line based in Madrid, Spain. The cruise line was aimed at the Spanish and Portuguese speaking markets. Iberocruceros operated voyages from Europe, the Mediterranean, and South America.

== History ==
The company was founded in 2003 as Viajes Iberojet and renamed in 2007 and became a joint subsidiary of Carnival Corporation & plc and Orizonia Corporation, under the executive control of Costa Cruises Group, Carnival Corporation's European division. Ibero Cruises started with three ships; Grand Mistral, Grand Latino, and Grand Voyager which were provided by Orizonia. In 2008, the Grand Celebration, provided by Carnival Cruises was transferred to the fleet of Ibero. An additional ship, the Grand Holiday, was transferred into the fleet in 2009 from Carnival.

It was announced in November 2014, that Costa Cruises would absorb Ibero Cruises in its entirety by the end of the year. The Grand Celebration would be transferred to the main fleet of Costa Crociere as the Costa Celebration. Also the Grand Holiday would be transferred to the British Cruise & Maritime Voyages as the Magellan.

Ibero's docking slots in Barcelona would be devoted solely to Costa's newest ship, the Costa Diadema as well.

== Former fleet ==
Ship	Class	Built	Service for Ibero Cruceros	Tonnage	Flag	Notes	Image
Grand Latino	Royal Viking Star class	1973	2004–2005	21,891 GRT	Portugal	Built as Royal Viking Sky for Royal Viking Line Sold to Fred. Olsen Cruise Lines in 2005 as Boudicca. Scrapped in Aliağa, Turkey in 2021.	
Grand Voyager		2000	2004–2011	24,427 GT	Portugal	Previously Olympic Voyager for Royal Olympic Cruises, In 2011 transferred to Costa Cruises as Costa Voyager. Sold to Bohai Ferry in 2014 as the Chinese Taishan.	
Grand Mistral	Mistral class	1999	2003–2013	48,200 GT	Portugal	Previously Mistral for the failed Festival Cruises, now with Ambassador Cruise Line as Ambition.	
Grand Celebration	Holiday class	1987	2008–2014	47,262 GT	Portugal	Previously Celebration for Carnival Cruise Lines. Transferred as the Costa Celebration to Costa Cruises in November 2014. Sold to Bahamas Paradise Cruise Line in December 2014. Scrapped in Alang, India in 2021.	
Grand Holiday	Holiday class	1985	2010–2014	46,052 GT	Portugal	Previously Holiday for Carnival Cruise Lines. She joined the Cruise & Maritime Voyages fleet in March 2015, as the Magellan. Scrapped in Alang, India in 2021.	
Costa Marina (Grand Marina)	Marina Class	1988	Never entered planned service	25,500 GT	Portugal?	Built as a container ship Axel Johnson in 1969. In 1988, Costa Cruises bought it and turned it into a cruise ship. Planned to replace the Grand Voyager in 2011, In 2012 it was sold to Harmony Cruises and Scrapped at Alang, India in 2014.	
