= Emission control area =

Regulated areas on airborne emissions

Emission control areas (ECAs), or sulfur emission control areas (SECAs), are sea areas in which stricter controls were established to minimize airborne emissions from ships as defined by Annex VI of the 1997 MARPOL Protocol.

The emissions specifically include SOx, NOx, ODSs and VOCs and the regulations came into effect in May 2005. Annex VI contains provisions for two sets of emission and fuel quality requirements regarding SOx and PM, or NOx, a global requirement and more stringent controls in special emission control areas (ECA). The regulations stems from concerns about "local and global air pollution and environmental problems" in regard to the shipping industry's contribution. In January 2020, a revised more stringent Annex VI was enforced in the emission control areas with significantly lowered emission limits.

As of 2011 there were four existing ECAs: the Baltic Sea, the North Sea, the North American ECA, including most of US and Canadian coast and the US Caribbean ECA. Also other areas may be added via protocol defined in Annex VI. ECAs with nitrogen oxides thresholds are denoted as nitrogen oxide emission control areas (NECAs).

Sulfur limits for fuel in ECAs
before 1 July 2010	1.50% m/m
1 July 2010 – 1 January 2015	1.00% m/m
after 1 January 2015	0.10% m/m

Sulfur limits for fuel in other sea areas
before 1 January 2012	4.50% m/m
1 January 2012 – 1 January 2020	3.50% m/m
after 1 January 2020	0.50% m/m

== Context ==
In 1972 with the United Nations Conference on the Human Environment, widespread concerns about air pollution led to international cooperation. Air pollution from "noxious gases from ships' exhausts" was already being discussed internationally. On 2 November 1973 the International Convention for the Prevention of Pollution from Ships was adopted and later modified by the 1978 Protocol (MARPOL 73/78). MARPOL is short for Marine Pollution. In 1979, the Convention on Long-Range Transboundary Air Pollution, the "first international legally binding instrument to deal with problems of air pollution" was signed. In 1997 the regulations regarding air pollution from ships as described in Annex VI of the MARPOL Convention were adopted. These "regulations set limits on sulfur oxide (SOx) and nitrogen oxide (NOx) emissions from ship exhausts and prohibit deliberate emissions of ozone-depleting substances." The current convention is a combination of 1973 Convention and the 1978 Protocol. It entered into force on 2 October 1983. According to the IMO, a United Nations agency responsible for the "safety and security of shipping and the prevention of marine pollution by ships", as of May 2013, 152 states, representing 99.2 per cent of the world's shipping tonnage, are parties to the convention.

== SECAs or ECAs ==
As of 2011 existing ECAs include the Baltic Sea (SOx, adopted 1997; enforced 2005) and the North Sea (SOx, 2005/2006 adopted July 2005; enforced 2006), the North American ECA, including most of US and Canadian coast (NOx & SOx, 2010/2012) and the US Caribbean ECA, including Puerto Rico and the US Virgin Islands (NOx & SOx, 2011/2014).

The Protocol of 1997 (MARPOL Annex VI ) included the new Annex VI of MARPOL 73/78, which went in effect on 19 May 2005.

== SOx emissions control ==
The purpose of the protocol was to reduce and to control the emissions coming from the marine vessels’ exhausts that pollute the environment. MARPOL convinced IMO to control the average worldwide sulfur content fuels. As of 1 January 2020 the Annex states that a global cap is 0.5% m/m on the sulfur content in fuel. However, MARPOL insist on it being 0.1% m/m in some regions classified as "SOx emission control areas" (SECAs).

On the other hand, MARPOL came up with a way to avoid using an exhaust gas cleaning systems or anything else that would limit SOx emissions. In fact, the exhaust gas cleaning systems must be approved by the State Administration before put into use. The regulations on the exhaust gas cleaning systems are to set by IMO.

The monitoring of sulfur content of residual fuel supplied for use on board ships is being performed by IMO since 1999. The IMO monitors it by the bunker reports around the world. According to The Marine Environment Protection Committee (MEPC) the worldwide average sulfur content in fuel oils for 2004 was 2.67 %m/m.

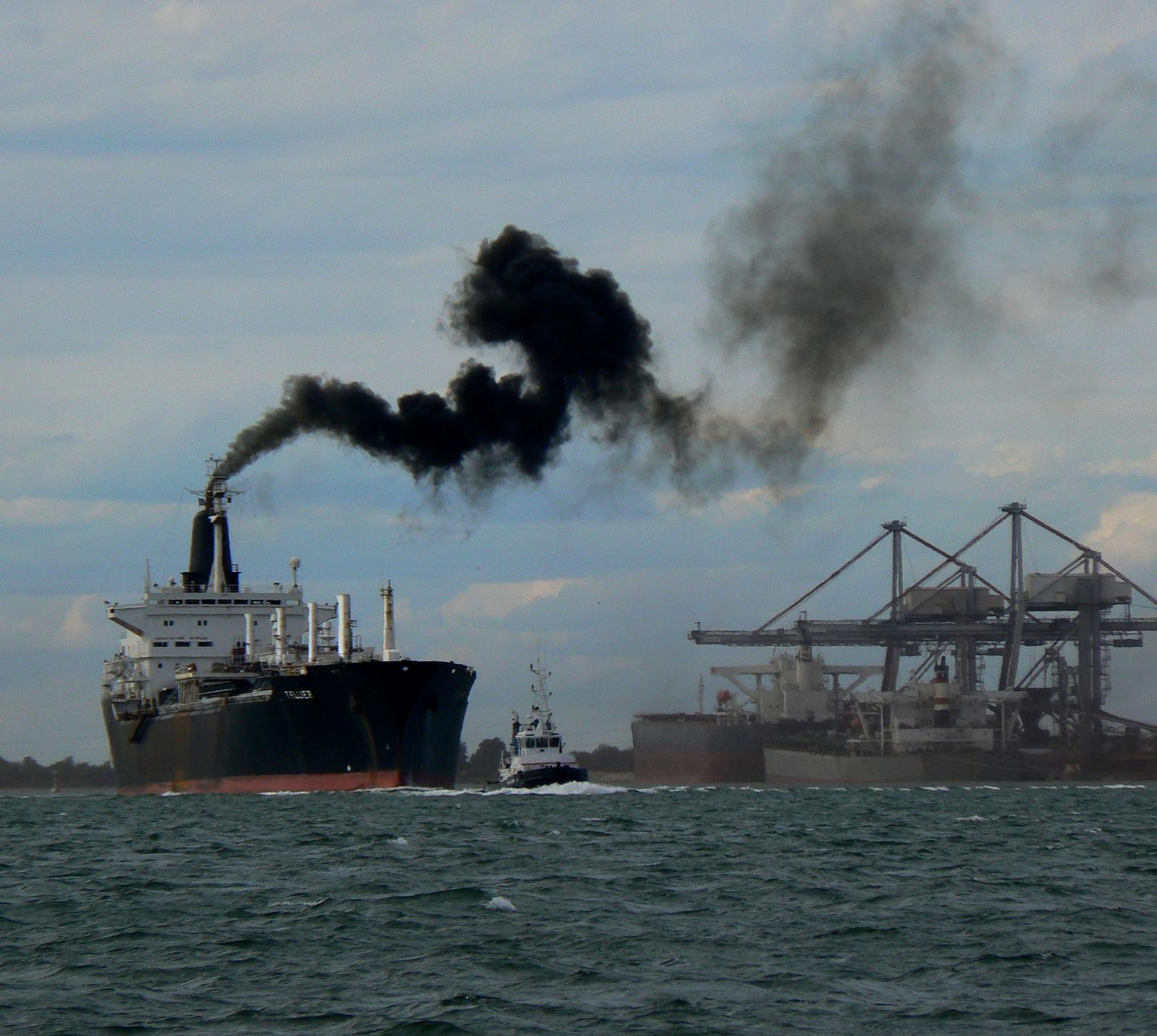
Ship Maneuvering out of Port S.Louis du Rhone, near Marseilles.

== Nitrogen Oxide (NOx) emissions – Regulation 13 ==
=== Engines ===
NOx control requirements apply worldwide to any installed marine diesel engine over 130 kW of output power other than the engines used solely for emergency purposes not in respect of the marine vessel's tonnage where the engine is installed. However, there are different levels of regulations that are based on the ship's date of construction and were the only require the regulation are met whilst in the area leading to cleaning systems that can be deactivated and engines that switch over to back to older fuel types. The levels if control are broken down into Tiers.

==== Tier I ====
Applies to the ships built after 1 January 2000. It states that for engines below 130 rpm must have the total weighted cycle emission limit (g/kWh) of 17, engines that are between 130 and 1999 rpm must have no more than 12.1 (g/kWh), engines above 2000 rpm must have the limit of 9.8 (g/kWh).

==== Tier II ====
Requirements: 14.4 (g/kWh) for engines less than 130 rpm, 9.7 (g/kWh) for engines 130 – 1999 rpm, and for engines over 2000 rpm 7.7 (g/kWh) is the limit. Tier II limits apply to the ships constructed after 1 January 2011.

==== Tier III ====
IMO Tier III is a control that only applies in specific areas where the NOx emission are more seriously controlled (NECAs) and apply to the ships constructed after 1 January 2016. For engines under 130 rpm the limit is 3.4 (g/Kwh), engines between 130 and 1999 rpm the limit us 2.4 (g/kWh), engines above 2000 rpm must have the total weighted cycle emission limit of 2.0 (g/kWh).

=== Incineration ===
Annex VI prohibits burning certain products aboard the ship. Those products include: contaminated packaging materials and polychlorinated biphenyls, garbage, as defined by Annex V, containing more than traces of heavy metals, refined petroleum products containing halogen compounds, sewage sludge, and sludge oil.

=== Greenhouse gas policy ===
The Marine Environment Protection Committee (MEPC) has strongly encouraged members to use the scheme to report the greenhouse gas emissions. Those gases include carbon dioxide, methane, nitrous oxide, hydrofluorocarbons, perfluorocarbons, and sulfur hexafluoride. The purpose of making the guidelines on CO_{2} emissions is to develop a system that would be used by ships during a trial period.

== Regulations of 2013 ==
In 2013 new regulations described in a chapter added to the MARPOL Annex VI came into effect in order to improve "energy efficiency of international shipping". The regulations apply to all marine vessels 400 gross tonnage or above. MARPOL requires the ship industry to use the EEDI mechanism that would ensure that all the required energy-efficiency levels are met. Also, all the ships are required to have a Ship Energy Efficiency Management Plan (SEEMP) on board, therefore, the seafarers always have a plan to refer to in order to maintain energy-efficiency levels required by the area the ship is at or sailing to at all times.

As for the additions to the Annex VI, there were corrections towards emissions, sewage, and garbage. Prior to the regulations adjusted in 2013 the sulfur emission control areas included: the Baltic Sea, the North Sea and the North American Area (coastal areas of the United States and Canada). However, the updated in 2013 version of Annex VI included the United States Caribbean Sea (specifically areas around Puerto Rico and the United States Virgin Islands) to the list.

As for the other regulations updates, there is possibility of establishing "special areas" where sewage discharge laws would be outstandingly stricter than in other areas, as well as, the few minor additions to the garbage disposal laws.

== Areas ==
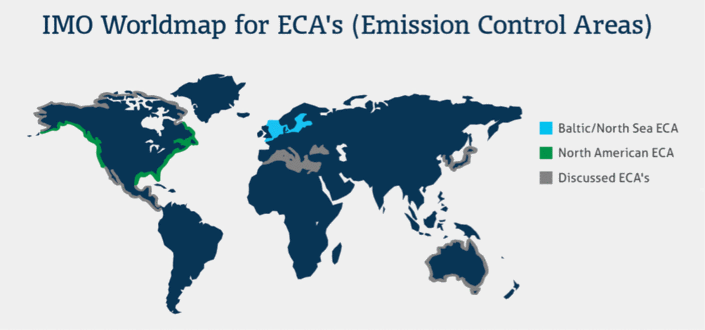
Map of the emission control areas

- Baltic Sea – since 1 August 2006
- North Sea – since 11 August 2007
- North America – since August 2012; extends 200 nautical miles (370 km; 230 mi) off the Atlantic, Gulf and Pacific coasts of Canada and the United States, including Hawaii
- Caribbean Sea – since January 2014; extends 20 to 40 nautical miles (37 to 74 km; 23 to 46 mi) off the coasts of U.S.-controlled territories, including Puerto Rico and the United States Virgin Islands
- Mediterranean Sea – since 1 May 2025

=== Proposed ===
- Norwegian Sea
- Parts of the Canadian Arctic
- North-East Atlantic Ocean

=== Areas with extra regulation ===
- heritage fjords in Norway (will require 100% emission-free sailing by 2026)

== Future ==
As with road vehicles adding large battery packs would add further benefits such as stabilising electrical systems, sailing with the engines off, plugging into the local grid when docked and the ability to visit places such as the heritage fjords in Norway (which require 100% emission-free sailing from 2026)

As well as reducing and/or cleaning diesel fumes alternative fuels maybe an option such as LNG
