= Hergot Chapel =

Church in Nordland, Norway

- Hergot kapell
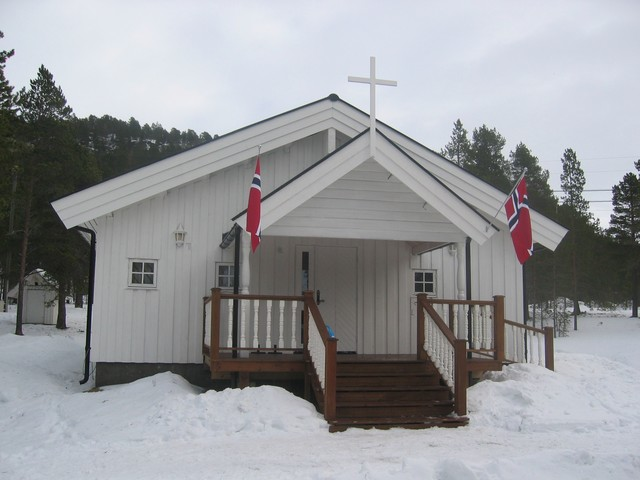
- View of the chapel
- Hergot Chapel
- 68.4501832°N 17.71073073°E
- Location: Narvik Municipality, Nordland
- Country: Norway
- Denomination: Church of Norway
- Churchmanship: Evangelical Lutheran

History
- Status: Chapel
- Founded: 2005
- Consecrated: 27 Aug 2005

Architecture
- Functional status: Active
- Architectural type: Long church
- Completed: 2005 (21 years ago)

Specifications
- Capacity: 90
- Materials: Wood

Administration
- Diocese: Sør-Hålogaland
- Deanery: Ofoten prosti
- Parish: Narvik

Hergot Chapel (Norwegian: Hergot kapell) is a chapel of the Church of Norway in Narvik Municipality in Nordland county, Norway. It is located in the village of Hergot. It is an annex chapel in the Narvik parish which is part of the Ofoten prosti (deanery) in the Diocese of Sør-Hålogaland. The white, wooden chapel was built in a long church style in 2005 to replace the old Straumsnes Chapel in nearby Straumsnes.

== History ==
A chapel was built in Straumsnes in 1927 to serve the people living around the Rombaken fjord. In 2005, a new chapel was built in Hergot, about 4 kilometres (2.5 mi) to the northeast, to replace the old chapel in Straumsnes. The new chapel is located at the site of the local cemetery. The foundation stone was laid in 1999 and the church was consecrated on 27 August 2005. In 2009, a free-standing bell tower was built next to the chapel.

== Media gallery ==
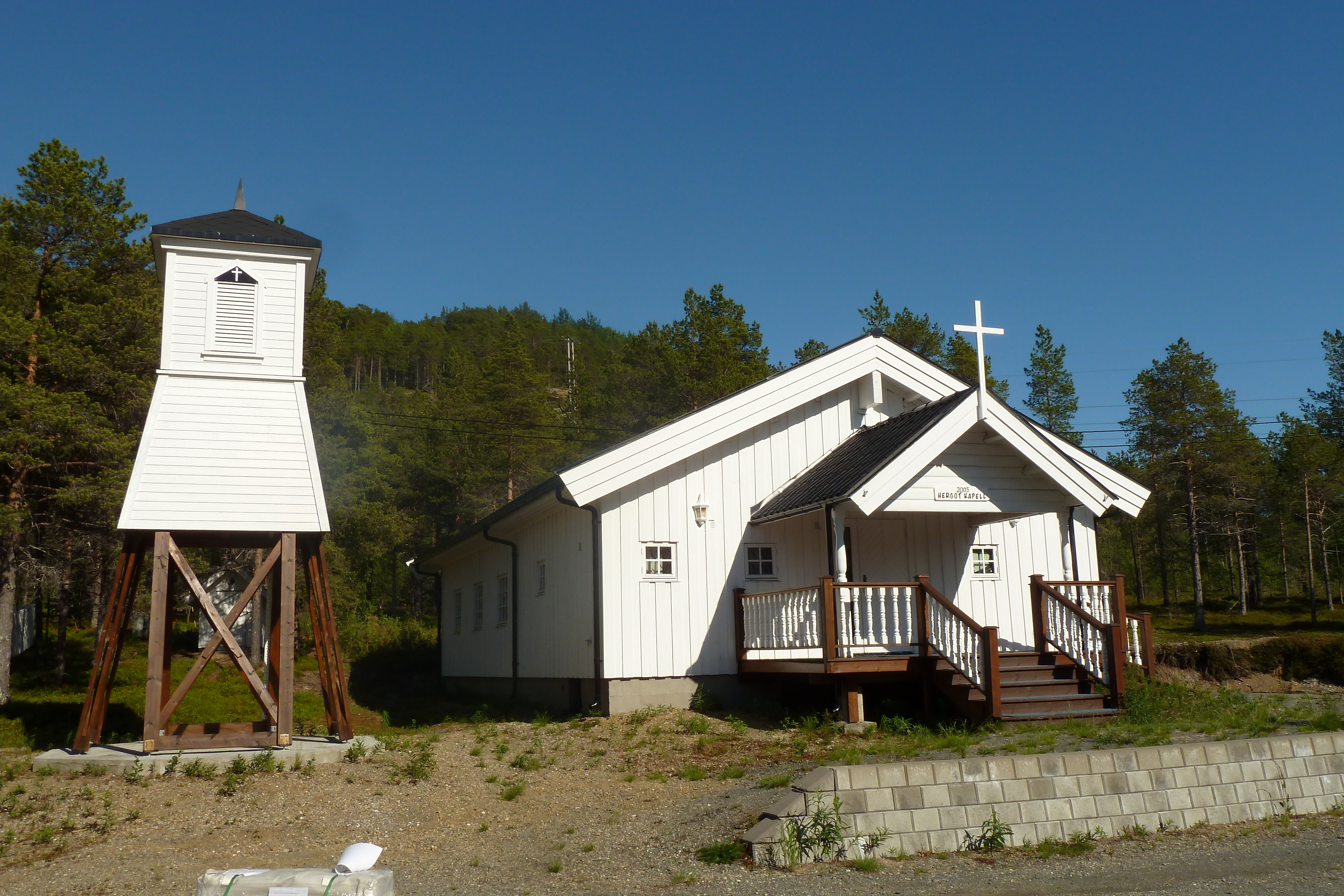

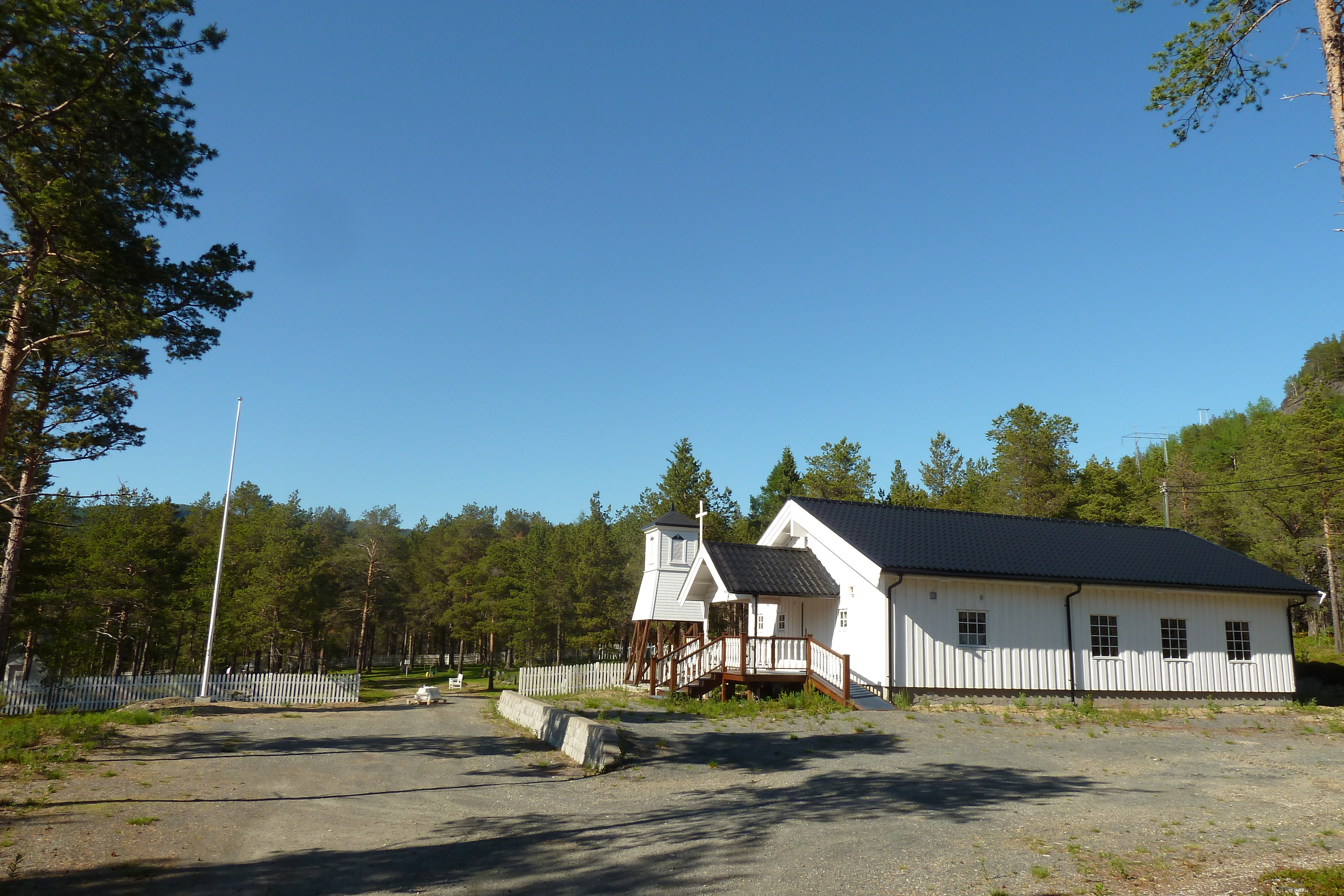

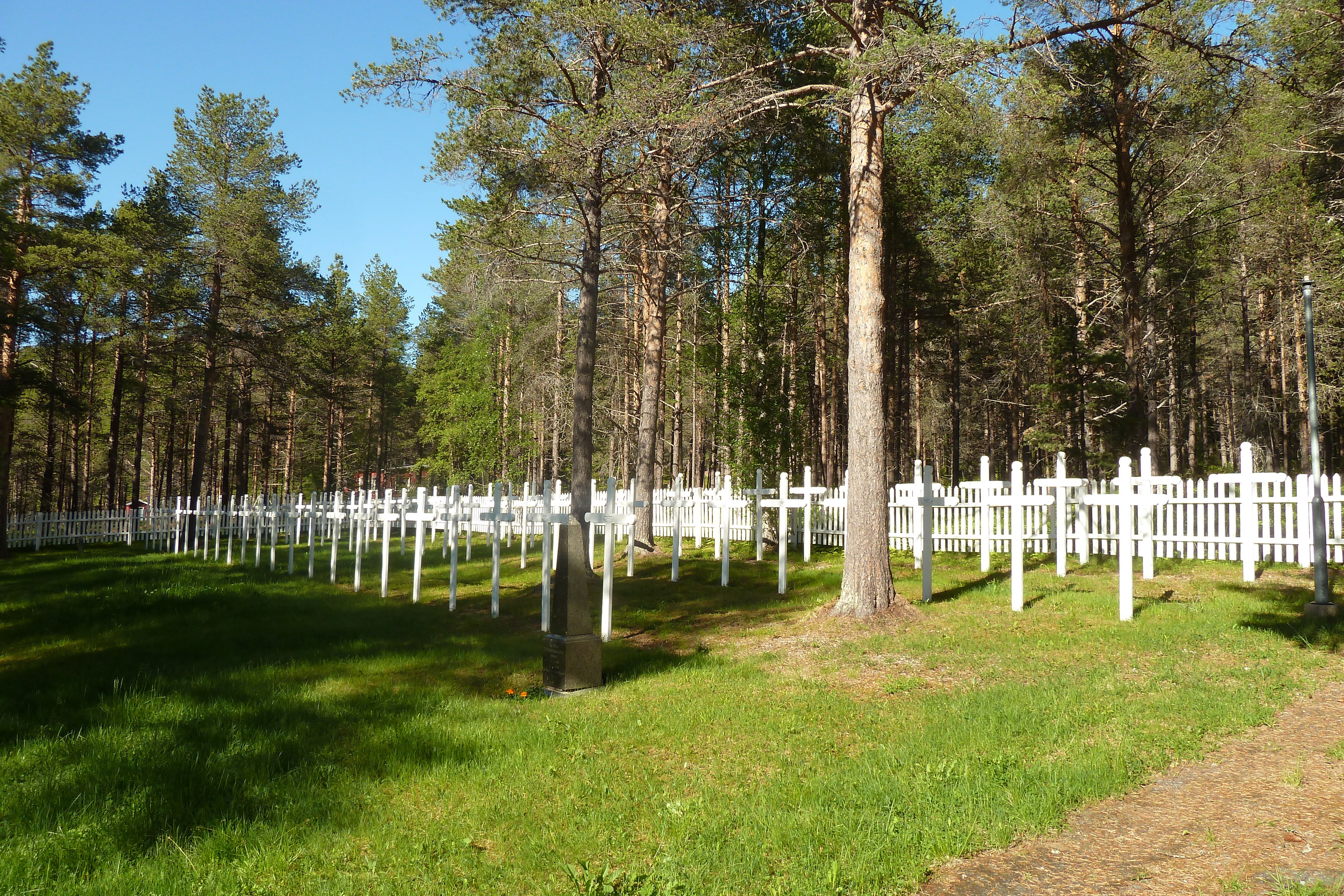

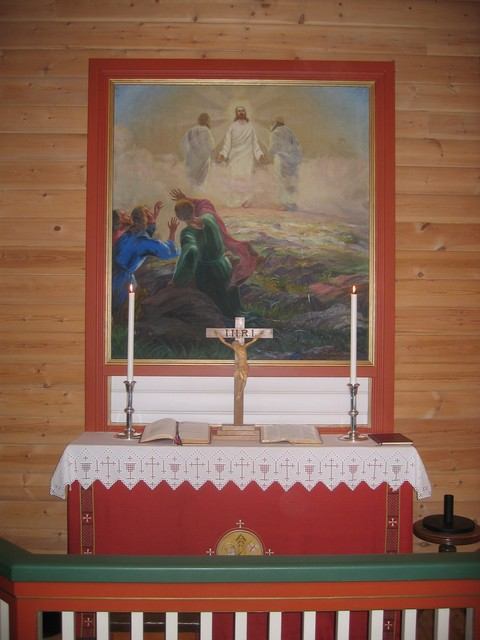

== See also ==
- List of churches in Sør-Hålogaland
