= Straumsnes, Narvik =

Village in Narvik Municipality, Norway

Straumsnes
- Village
- Interactive map of Straumsnes
- Location within Nordland Location within Norway
- Coordinates: 68.4411°N 17.6545°E
- Country: Norway
- Region: Northern Norway
- County: Nordland
- District: Ofoten
- Municipality: Narvik Municipality
- Elevation: 41 m (135 ft)
- Time zone: UTC+01:00 (CET)
  - Summer (DST): UTC+02:00 (CEST)
- Post Code: 8517 Narvik

Straumsnes (or Strømsnes) is a village in Narvik Municipality in Nordland county, Norway. The village is located along the Rombaken fjord between the town of Narvik and the village of Hergot. The village has a train station on the Ofotbanen railway line, between Narvik Station and Rombak Station. The village sits along the European route E06 highway, just southeast of the Rombak Bridge.
