= Miss Grand Japan 2025 =

11th Miss Grand Japan competition

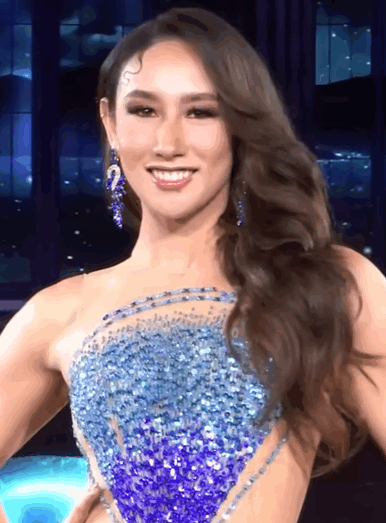
- Erika Ishibashi
- Date: 10 September 2025
- Venue: MSC Bellissima Cruise
- Broadcaster: YouTube
- Entrants: 18
- Placements: 9
- Winner: Erika Ishibashi (Japanese communities in USA)
- Best in Swimwear: Ran Izumi (Kanagawa)
- Miss Popular: Maria Shiraishi (Gunma)

External videos
- Grand final

Miss Grand Japan 2025 (Japanese: 2025 ミス・グランド・ジャパン) was the eleventh Miss Grand Japan contest, held on 10 September 2025 on the MSC Bellissima Cruise. Eighteen contestants from different prefectures of Japan competed for the right to represent Japan in the Miss Grand International 2025 pageant, held in Thailand on 18 October 2025.

The pageant was won by a professional dancer, Erika Ishibashi, representing the Japanese communities in the USA. Ishibashi was crowned by the preceding Miss Grand Japan 2024 Luma Naomi of Aichi and later competed internationally in the international tournament held in Thailand, where she was placed among the top 22 finalists and also won the Grand Talent Award.

== Background ==
=== Date and venue ===
On 2 April 2025, Miss Grand Co., Ltd. announced on social media that the 2025 Miss Grand Japan competition will be held on the MSC Bellissima Cruise with 18 contestants participating. However, no further details have been revealed.

=== Selection of contestants ===
The national finalists for this year's edition were decided through an online screening by the national licensee and regional preliminaries round held in 4 regions of the country, as detailed below.

Region	Date	Qualifiers	Ref.
North region – Akita	3 March 2025	7	
West region – Osaka	8 March 2025	6	
South region	8 March 2025	17 (Note: Combined number of eligible contestants from both South and East regions.)	
East region – Tokyo	15 March 2025	17	

== Competition results ==
Miss Grand Japan 2025 competition result by prefecture of origin
Color key:
Winner	1st runner-up
2nd runner-up	3rd runner-up
4th runner-up	Top 9
Unplaced	No representative

Placement	Candidate
Winner	Japanese in USA – Erika Ishibashi
1st runner-up	Nara – Yuka Oyama
2nd runner-up	Fukuoka – Miyu Onodera
3rd runner-up	Gunma III – Mio Yamamoto
4th runner-up	Hyogo – Hazuki Ogino
Top 9	Gunma I – Maria Shiraishi; Osaka I – Umi Shirano; Saitama – Rinka; Tokyo – Lena Takeuchi
Special awards
Best in Mysta	Hyogo – Hazuki Ogino
Best in Live	Osaka I – Umi Shirano
Best in Swimwear	Kanagawa – Ran Izumi
Best in Social Media	Saitama – Rinka
Best in Evening Gown	Fukuoka – Miyu Onodera
Miss Popular	Gunma I – Maria Shiraishi
Miss MSC Belissima	Tokyo – Lena Takeuchi
Regional Director Award
Best Director	West Region – Yukako Sakata and Yuka Hatanaka

== Contestants ==
Initially, 30 candidates qualified for the early stage; the number was then reduced to 18 due to disqualifications and withdrawals.

=== Finalized candidates ===
Eighteen candidates competed for the title.

- Akita – Yoshii Yukako
- Aomori – Iida Kokone
- Fukuoka – Onodera Nayu
- Gunma I – Shiraishi Maria
- Gunma II – Satō Minami
- Gunma III – Yamamoto Miu
- Hyōgo – Hagino Natsuki
- Japanese in USA – Ishibashi Erika
- Kanagawa – Izumi Ran
- Kōchi – Yamagata Himeki
- Nara – Ōyama Yuka
- Osaka I – Shirano Umi
- Osaka II – Shiba Naika
- Saga – Harada Roderikku Ragureva
- Saitama – Rinka
- Tokyo – Takeuchi Reina
- Toyama – Momose Sarika
- Yamanashi – Sasaki Miho

=== Original 30 aspirants ===
Prefecture	Candidate		Hometown
Prefecture	Romanized name	Japanese name	Hometown
Akita I	Murakami Tsukasa	村上 つかさ	Daisen
Akita II	Sato Yuka	佐藤 優果	Akita
Akita III	Kimura Saki	木村 颯希	Akita
Akita IV	Yoshii Yukako	吉井 優花子	Akita
Aomori	Iida Kokone	飯田 心音	Aomori
Chiba	Megumi Rivera	リベラ メグミ	
Fukuoka	Miyu Onodera	小野 寺南友	
Gunma I	Minami Sato	佐藤みなみ	
Gunma II	Maria Shiraishi	白石 万梨亜	
Gunma III	Mio Yamamoto	山本 実生	
Hyogo	Hazuki Ogino	荻野葉月	
Japanese in USA	Erika Ishibashi	石橋 恵莉加	
Kanagawa	Ran Izumi	和泉 蘭	
Kochi	Satsuki Yamagata	山形 颯生	
Kyoto	Nomura Seina	野村星奈	
Miyagi I	Riho Miyai	宮井 梨帆	
Miyagi II	Kaori Hirose	広瀬 香織	
Nara	Yuka Oyama	大山祐佳	
Osaka I	Maika Shiba	斯波真以佳	
Osaka II	Umi Shirano	白乃うみ	
Saga	Hadara Rodelyn Lagleva	原田 ロデリン ラグレヴァ	
Saitama I	Rinka	凜華	
Saitama II	Kyoka Itabashi	板橋 きょうか	
Tokyo I	Hamabe Kaho	濱辺 華穂	Tokyo
Tokyo II	Rin'i (Lily)	凜衣（リリィ）	
Tokyo III	Izumi Nishida	西田 いづみ	
Tokyo VI	Lena Takeuchi	竹内 怜奈	
Toyama	Sarika Momose	百生 沙梨香	
Yamanashi	Miho Sasaki	佐々木 美穂	
Withdrawals
Miyazaki	Matsuda Yume	松田 侑女	Miyazaki

== List of regional coordinators ==
The following is a list of Miss Grand Japan 2025 coordinators who organized their local preliminary pageant to select regional representatives for this year's national contest.

- East region, directed by Saeko Oda (織田さえこ) and Airi Nakamura (中村あいり).
- North region (Tōhoku region), headquartered at the Akita Model Agency (秋田モデル事務所) in Akita, directed by Erika Toyoshima (豊嶋江梨香).
- South region, directed by Midori Kotani (小谷 緑).
- West region, directed by Yuka Hatanaka (畠中 優香) and Yukako Sakata (坂田 侑嘉子).
