= Hergot =

Village in Narvik Municipality, Norway

Hergot: Hergot (Norwegian); Hearrágoahti (Northern Sami)
- Village
- Interactive map of Hergot
- Location within Nordland Location within Norway
- Coordinates: 68.4578°N 17.7007°E
- Country: Norway
- Region: Northern Norway
- County: Nordland
- District: Ofoten
- Municipality: Narvik Municipality
- Elevation: 20 m (66 ft)
- Time zone: UTC+01:00 (CET)
  - Summer (DST): UTC+02:00 (CEST)
- Post Code: 8519 Narvik

Hergot (Norwegian) or Hearrágoahti (Northern Sami) is a hamlet in Narvik Municipality in Nordland county, Norway. It is located by the Rombaken fjord, just north of the Rombak Bridge. Hergot Chapel is located on the south side of the hamlet.

Road 7575 from Narvik crosses Hergot, and links to E10 between Lofoten in the west and Luleå, Sweden in the east.
