= Building Giants (TV series) =

British-American documentary television series

- Genre: Documentary
- Narrated by: Julian Barratt
- Country of origin: United Kingdom
- Original language: English
- No. of seasons: 4
- No. of episodes: 8 per season

Production
- Running time: 44 minutes
- Production company: Windfall Films

Original release
- Network: Science Channel (United States); Channel 4 (United Kingdom)
- Release: January 4, 2018 – present

Building Giants is a British documentary television series covering the design and construction of large structures, including stadiums, tunnels, bridges, cruise ships, and other giant engineering feats that premiered in early 2018.

== Broadcast History ==
The show first aired on the Science Channel in the U.S. on January 4, 2018 with the "World's Greatest Stadium" episode that shows the Mercedes-Benz Stadium in Atlanta. Discovery Networks reported that along with Mega Machines, the series pushed Thursday ratings up 32% over January 2017. The series premiered on Channel 4 in the United Kingdom (the show's production country), starting on April 16, 2018 beginning with the "World's Strongest Wall" episode that features the MOSE in Venice, Italy.

On August 5, 2019, it was announced that the second season will premiere on August 7, 2019.

On May 4, 2020, it was announced that the third season will premiere on May 6, 2020.

The first season of the series is currently available for streaming online on ITV Studios' YouTube channel Blueprint, as well as Amazon Prime Video, FilmRise (who holds the AVOD streaming rights to ITV Studios shows that Shout! Studios does not distribute in North America), The Roku Channel and Tubi, while the second, third and fourth seasons of the show are currently available on Discovery+.

== Episode list ==
=== Season 1 ===
1. January 4 "World's Greatest Stadium" Mercedes-Benz Stadium in Atlanta, Georgia, United States
2. January 11 "Monster Cruise Ship" MSC Meraviglia in Saint-Nazaire, Loire-Atlantique, France
3. January 18 "Super Skyscraper NYC" 53W53 (MoMA Tower) in New York, New York, United States
4. January 25 "Arctic Mega Bridge" Hålogaland Bridge in Narvik, Nordland, Norway
5. February 1 "World's Strongest Wall" MOSE Project around Venice, Veneto, Italy
6. February 8 "Monster Tunnel" Copenhagen–Ringsted Line on Zealand, Denmark
7. February 15 "World's Tallest Church" Sagrada Familia in Barcelona, Catalonia, Spain
8. February 22 "World's Toughest Skyscraper" CITIC Tower (China Zun) in Beijing, China

The first episode was re-aired as "episode 9" (titled "Big Game Stadium") at the end of January 2019, just before the stadium hosted Super Bowl LIII.
