= Miss Grand Japan =

National beauty contest in Japan

Miss Grand Japan ミス・グランド・ジャパン
- Formation: August 24, 2015; 11 years ago
- Founder: Eriko Yoshii
- Type: Beauty pageant
- Headquarters: Tokyo
- Location: Japan
- Official language: Japanese
- National Director: Eriko Yoshii
- Parent organization: Miss Grand Japan Co., Ltd.
- Affiliations: Miss Grand International
- Website: Official website

Miss Grand Japan (Japanese: ミス・グランド・ジャパン) is a national female beauty pageant in Japan, held annually since 2015, aiming to select the country representative for Miss Grand International, which is an annual international beauty pageant promoting World Peace and against all kinds of conflicts. The pageant has been being organized by Miss Grand Japan Co., Ltd., headed by the first Miss Grand Japan Eriko Yoshii, since its establishment.

Since its first participation at Miss Grand International in 2013, Japan holds a record of 6 placements; in 2014 – 2015, 2018 – 2020 and 2024. The highest achievement is the fourth runner-up, obtained by Haruka Oda of Saitama in 2018. Japan also won the best evening gown award in 2015 and the best national costume award in 2020 and 2023.

Eriko Yoshii won the Silver Grand Award in 2022 for being one of the top three national directors and the Golden Grand Award in 2024, which is awarded for being the best national director.

== History ==
Japan has participated in Miss Grand International since 2013. The inaugural edition of Miss Grand Japan was organized by Eriko Yoshii, Miss Grand Japan 2013, acquired the license in 2013. In 2015, The first event was arranged at Happo-en in Minato, featuring 20 national finalists, of which, a 25-year-old registered nurse from Saitama, Ayaka Tanaka, was named the winner. Since then, the pageant had been held annually in Greater Tokyo Area.

In 2021, the original winner, Sarina Chanana of Chiba, was forced to resign due to some documents problems, which caused the organizer to cancel all results of such an edition and hold the contest again to determine the replacement. In 2023, Yayoi Machida won the title of Miss Grand Japan.

== Edition ==
=== Location and date ===
The following list is the edition detail of the Miss Grand Japan contest, since its inception in 2015.

Year	Edition	Date	Final venue	Host Prefecture	Entrants	Ref.
2015	1st	24 Aug	Happo-en, Minato	Tokyo	22	
2016	2nd	11 Sep	Bunka Fashion College, Shibuya	Tokyo	20	
2017	3rd	12 Sep	Selene Studio, Minato	Tokyo	8	
2018	4th	31 Jul	WOMB Night Club, Shibuya	Tokyo	15	
2019	5th	16 July	Yokohama Kannai Hall, Naka-ku	Yokohama	30	
2020	6th	11 Sep	The Grand Hall Tokyo, Minato	Tokyo	36	
2021	7th	24 Sep	Hotel Gajoen Tokyo, Meguro	Tokyo	46	
2021	—N/a	21 Oct	The event was virtually held due to the COVID-19 pandemic.		15	
2022	8th	6 Aug	Yokosuka Arts Theater, Yokosuka	Kanagawa	22	
2023	9th	16 Jul	Tokyo FM Center, Chiyoda	Tokyo	14	
2024	10th	20 Jul	New Piea Hall, Minato	Tokyo	20	
2025	11th	10 Sep	MSC Bellissima Cruise	—N/a	18	
2026	12th	10 Aug	Hulic Hall, Yurakucho	Tokyo	17	

=== Competition result ===
Year	Miss Grand Japan	Runners-up				Ref.
Year	Miss Grand Japan	1st runner-up	2nd runner-up	3rd runner-up	4th runner-up	Ref.
2013	Eriko Yoshii (Akita)	No runners-up, the titleholders were appointed to the position.				
2014	Mieko Takeuchi^{[α]} (Hyōgo)	No runners-up, the titleholders were appointed to the position.				
2015	Ayaka Tanaka (Saitama)	Mao Kaneko (Aichi)	Nanami Tomita (Chiba)	—N/a	—N/a	
2016	Ayaka Sato (Aichi)	Eria Taira (Okinawa)	Ruri Yoshida (Chiba)	—N/a	—N/a	
2017	Erika Tsuji (Kyoto)	Arisa Katsumoto (Fukui)	Aya Kitoya (Kumamoto)	—N/a	—N/a	
2018	Haruka Oda (Saitama)	Rie Kuroki (Aichi)	Kanami Tobita (Miyagi)	—N/a	—N/a	
2019	Adeline Minatoya (Nagano)	Daina Itagaki (Fukuoka)	Miho Omori (Kanagawa)	Honomi Sekine (Tochigi)	Hina Taniguchi (Osaka)	
2020	Ruri Saji (Saga)	Karin Kyotan (Toyama)	Makaha Oguma (Nara)	Arika Wakabayashi (Tokyo)	Yuri Koezuka (Kanagawa)	
2021	Sarina Chanana (Chiba)	Kayo Kishikawa (Tokyo)	Karen Ishigaki (Yamagata)	—N/a	—N/a	
2021	Chika Mizuno (Tokyo)	Rika Kinoshita (Hyōgo)	Yumiko Nishimori (Tokyo)	Yuka Sano (Kyoto)	Fumika Kiryu (Tokyo)	
2022	Seira Inoue (Tokyo)	Maria Nasu (Yamagata)	Mizuki Takashima (Chiba)	Anna Yamanouchi (Kanagawa)	Yukino Jahana (Okinawa)	
2023	Yayoi Machida (Tokyo)	Karina Yamada (Chiba)	Yuka Oyama (Nara)	Taeko Yoshida (Osaka)	Yuki Furihata (Chiba)	
2024	Naomi Shigemitsu (Aichi)	Erika Ishibashi (Japanese in USA)	Anna Hayakawa (Kanagawa)	Sayo Nodake (Hokkaido)	Miho Ogawa (Tochigi)	
2025	Erika Ishibashi (Japanese in USA)	Yuka Oyama (Nara)	Miyu Onodera (Fukuoka)	Mio Yamamoto (Gunma)	Hazuki Ogino (Hyogo)	
2026	Sara Chiba (Aichi)	Chieko Ishibashi (Japanese in USA)	Yuka Oyama (Nara)	Reika Nakatsu (Japanese in China)	Maria Sano (Tottori)	
Note: 1. ^α Later Miss Supranational Japan 2015.

== International competition ==
The following is a list of Japanese representatives at the Miss Grand International contest.

Color keys

- : Declared as the winner
- : Ended as a runner-up (Top 5)
- : Ended as a finalist (Top 10)
- : Ended as a semifinalist (Top 20/21)
- : Ended as special awards winner

Year	Prefecture	Miss Grand Japan	National qualification	Placement	Special Awards	National Director
2026	Aichi	Sara Chiba	Miss Grand Japan 2026	Unplaced		Eriko Yoshii
2025	Japanese in USA	Erika Ishibashi	Miss Grand Japan 2025	Top 22	Grand Talent Award	Eriko Yoshii
2024	Aichi	Luma Naomi Shigemitsu	Miss Grand Japan 2024	Top 20		Eriko Yoshii
2023	Tokyo	Yayoi Machida	Miss Grand Japan 2023	Unplaced	Best National Costume	Eriko Yoshii
2022	Tokyo	Seira Inoue	Miss Grand Japan 2022	Unplaced		Eriko Yoshii
2021	Tokyo	Chika Mizuno	Miss Grand Japan 2021	Unplaced		Eriko Yoshii
2021	Chiba	Sarina Chanana	Miss Grand Japan 2021	Resigned		Eriko Yoshii
2020	Saga	Ruri Saji	Miss Grand Japan 2020	Top 20	Best National Costume	Eriko Yoshii
2019	Nagano	Adeline Minatoya	Miss Grand Japan 2019	Top 20		Eriko Yoshii
2018	Saitama	Haruka Oda	Miss Grand Japan 2018	4th runner-up		Eriko Yoshii
2017	Kyoto	Erika Tsuji	Miss Grand Japan 2017	Unplaced		Eriko Yoshii
2016	Aichi	Ayaka Sato	Miss Grand Japan 2016	Unplaced		Eriko Yoshii
2015	Saitama	Ayaka Tanaka	Miss Grand Japan 2015	Top 10	Best Evening Gown	Stephen Diáz
2014	Hyōgo	Mieko Takeuchi	Appointment	Top 20	Best in Social Media	Stephen Diáz
2013	Akita	Eriko Yoshii	Appointment	Unplaced		Stephen Diáz

== Gallery ==
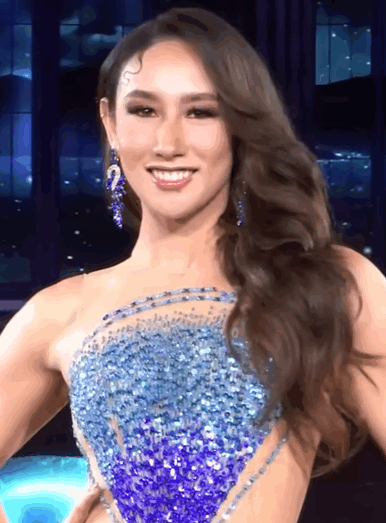
Erika Ishibashi
Miss Grand Japan 2025

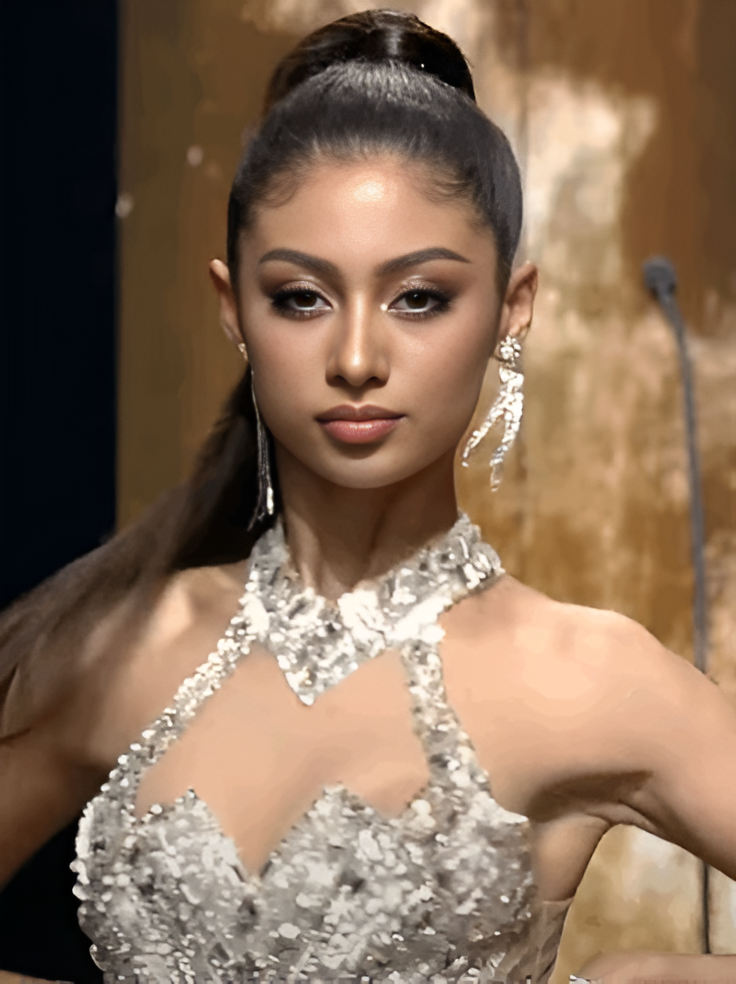
Naomi Shigemitsu
Miss Grand Japan 2024

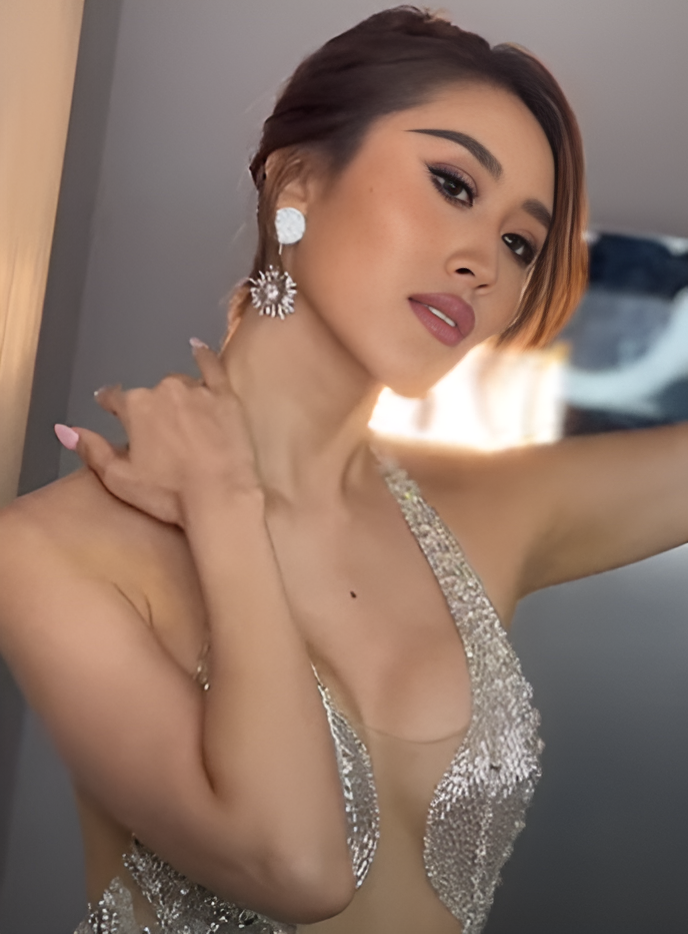
Yayoi Machida
Miss Grand Japan 2023

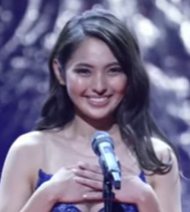
Seira Inoue
Miss Grand Japan 2022

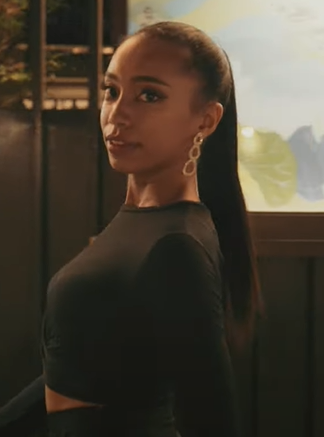
Chika Mizuno
Miss Grand Japan 2021

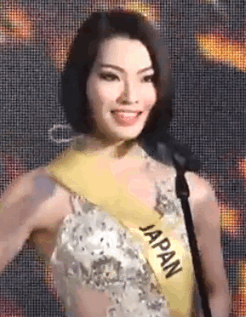
Ayaka Tanaka
Miss Grand Japan 2015
