= Miss Grand Japan 2017 =

3rd edition of the Miss Grand Japan beauty pageant

- Date: September 12, 2017
- Presenters: Ryusuke Kelly
- Entertainment: Strom
- Venue: Selene Studio, Minato, Tokyo
- Entrants: 8
- Placements: 5
- Winner: Erika Tsuji (Kyoto)
- Best in Swimsuit: Arisa Katsumoto (Fukui)

Miss Grand Japan 2017 (Japanese: 2017 ミス・グランド・ジャパン) was the third edition of the Miss Grand Japan pageant, held on September 12, 2017, at the Selene Studio, Minato, Tokyo. Eight contestants from different prefectures competed for the title. At the end of the event, a 27-year-old MC and model from Kyoto, Erika Tsuji, was announced the winner, while Arisa Katsumoto of Fukui and Aya Kitoya of Kumamoto were named the first and second runners-up, respectively.

Erika Tsuji later represented Japan at the Miss Grand International 2017 pageant, held in Phú Quốc, Vietnam, but was unplaced.

The event was hosted by a Japanese radio personality and screenwriter, Ryusuke Kelly, and featured a live performance by a Japanese electronic music artist trio group, Strom.

== Background ==
In the committee meeting arranged after the finishing of the Miss Grand Japan 2016 contest in September 2016, the schedule for the 2017 national competition was decided: the application to participate was set to be launched from February 1 to May 14, 2017, with the regional competition started from May to August, and the national final round on September 11.

Of all the applicants, only 14 qualified for the semi-final round, in which six were eliminated, making the final of eight candidates who competed at the national final held on September 12, 2017, in Tokyo.

== Result ==
Position	Delegate
Miss Grand Japan 2017	05. Kyoto – Erika Tsuji
1st runner-up	11. Fukui − Arisa Katsumoto
2nd runner-up	06. Kumamoto – Aya Kitoya
Top 5	No data available; No data available
Special award
Best in Swimsuit	11. Fukui − Arisa Katsumoto
Miss Popular Vote	01. Kyoto − Yui Morie
Best Social Media	04. Akita − Erina Kudo

== Contestants ==
Initially, fourteen contestants were confirmed to participate; however, six withdrew or were eliminated, finalizing eight contestants.

No.	Prefecture	Candidate		Age	Height
No.	Prefecture	Romanized name	Japanese name	Age	Height
01.	Kyoto	Yui Morie	森江 由衣	23	1.71 m (5 ft 7 1/2 in)
02.	Tokyo	Ayami Yamamoto	山本 彩未	27	1.68 m (5 ft 6 in)
03.	Tokyo	Erina Kudo	工藤 えりな	26	1.69 m (5 ft 6 1/2 in)
04.	Akita	Tsukika Kudo (Note: Eliminated/Withdrew)	Not available; eliminated candidate		
05.	Kyoto	Erika Tsuji	辻 絵里華	27	1.71 m (5 ft 7 1/2 in)
06.	Kumamoto	Aya Kitoya	清田 彩	27	1.73 m (5 ft 8 in)
07.	Chiba	Sosori Hashimoto	Not available; eliminated candidate		
08.	Chiba	Kaori Hashimoto	Not available; eliminated candidate		
09.	Kanagawa	Miu Takahashi	髙橋 美羽	17	1.70 m (5 ft 7 in)
10.	Hokkaido	Satomi Matsuda	松田 里美	25	1.65 m (5 ft 5 in)
11.	Fukui	Arisa Katsumoto	勝本 有莉実		1.70 m (5 ft 7 in)
12.	Tokyo	Nanaka Katakura	片倉 奈々加	25	1.70 m (5 ft 7 in)
13.	Shizuoka	Yuki Hosoya	細谷 優希	24	1.75 m (5 ft 9 in)
14.	Osaka	Rukana Kitajima	Not available; eliminated candidate		
