= MSC Meraviglia =

Cruise ship operated by MSC Cruises

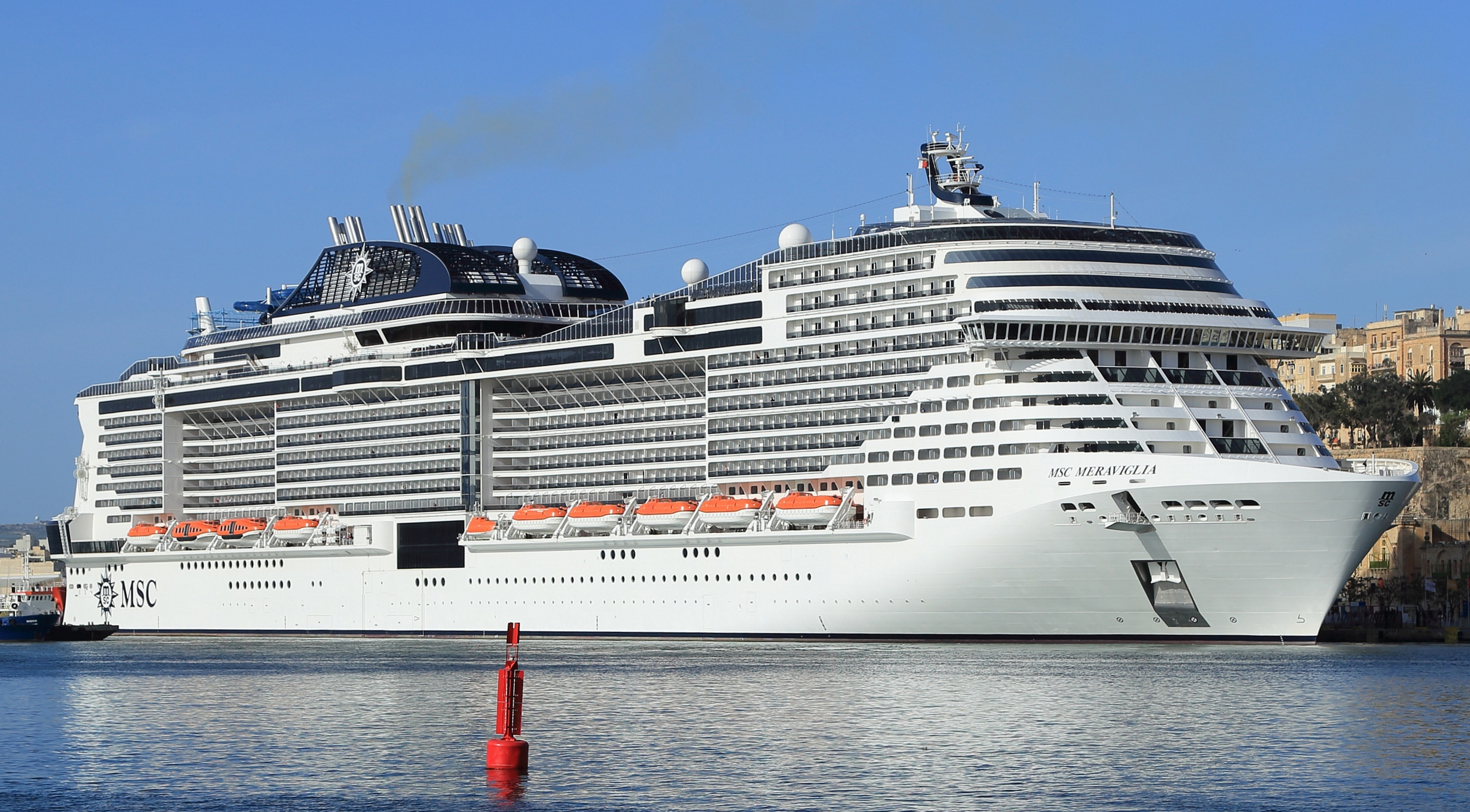
- MSC Meraviglia in Grand Harbour, Malta in 2018

History

Malta
- Name: MSC Meraviglia
- Owner: MSC Cruises
- Operator: MSC Cruises
- Port of registry: Valletta, Malta
- Ordered: 20 March 2014
- Builder: STX France (Saint-Nazaire)
- Laid down: October 2015
- Launched: 2 September 2016
- Sponsored by: Sophia Loren
- Christened: 3 June 2017
- Completed: 31 May 2017
- In service: 3 June 2017–present
- Identification: Call sign: 9HA4455; IMO number: 9760512; MMSI number: 249973000
- Status: In service

General characteristics
- Class & type: Project Vista (MSC) cruise ship
- Tonnage: 171,598 GT; 12,200 DWT
- Length: 315.83 m (1,036 ft 2 in)
- Beam: 43 m (141 ft 1 in)
- Height: 65 m (213 ft)
- Draught: 8.75 m (28 ft 8 in)
- Decks: 15 passenger decks
- Installed power: 2 × 4T - 12 cyl Wärtsilä 12V46CR diesel engines; 2 × 4T - 16 cyl Wärtsilä 16V46CR diesel engines
- Propulsion: Diesel-electric; 2 × ABB Azipod (2 × 19.2 MW) 38.4 MW (51,500 hp) total power
- Speed: 22.7 knots (42.0 km/h; 26.1 mph) (maximum); 21.8 knots (40.4 km/h; 25.1 mph) (service)
- Capacity: 4,488 passengers at double occupancy; 5,642 passengers maximum
- Crew: 1,536 crew

MSC Meraviglia is a cruise ship owned and operated by MSC Cruises, built at the Chantiers de l'Atlantique shipyard in Saint-Nazaire, France, by STX France. MSC Meraviglia is the lead ship of the Meraviglia class, second ship, MSC Bellissima, entering service in 2019. Each vessel has a passenger capacity of 4,500. The ship design includes a large interior promenade with an LED panel ceiling. A larger Meraviglia Plus variant was later introduced with MSC Grandiosa, MSC Virtuosa. and MSC Euribia

After entering service in June 2017, the MSC Meraviglia operated in Europe, as well as operating some cruises from Miami. In February 2020, with the outbreak of the COVID-19 pandemic, the ship was denied entry to ports in Jamaica and the Cayman Islands before being allowed to dock in Cozumel, Mexico. In April 2023, the MSC Meraviglia began year-round operations from the Brooklyn Cruise Terminal in New York City, where there was some backlash from the local community over pollution and other issues. MSC Meraviglia is ending operations from New York City in April 2026, with future plans to operate seasonal cruises from Miami, the Caribbean, and Europe. In late 2027, the vessel is debuting in South America for cruises to Brazil and Argentina.

== Design and construction ==
MSC Cruises and STX France signed a letter of intent in March 2014 for the construction of two ships in a new Meraviglia class, each measuring 167,600 gross tons, with the first to be delivered in 2017. The following year, the vessel's name was announced, and steel was cut, at a ceremony held at Chantiers de l'Atlantique on 20 April 2015. The ship was formally named on 3 June 2017 by her godmother, Italian actress Sophia Loren at a ceremony in Le Havre, which also featured French actor Patrick Bruel, musical group Kids United, and comedian Gad Elmaleh.

Construction of MSC Meraviglia involved building 50 large prefabricated hull sections, or “megablocks”, with about 35,000 tons of steel, which were then used to assemble the ship. Cabins were constructed as modules at a separate facility and later installed on the ship. The building of MSC Meraviglia was shown in the second episode of the Science Channel series, Building Giants, and titled "Monster Cruise Ship".

The ship uses a diesel-electric propulsion system, with four diesel engines generating electrical power that drive the two azipod units, each containing an electric motor and fixed-pitch propeller, mounted beneath the stern.

The ship's facilities include an interior promenade with a long LED roof, a water park with water slides, a rope course and a theater. The ship overall has less passenger space and more passengers onboard than other similar cruise ships. The ship also has over ten dining areas and a spa. The ship is equipped with an exhaust gas cleaning system and an advanced wastewater treatment system, with the ability to retain wastewater on board for up to two days rather than discharging it immediately.

The ship is equipped for cold ironing (shore power), allowing it to connect to shoreside electricity while in port and turn off its engines. Despite this capability, MSC Meraviglia had been unable to connect to shore power at the Brooklyn Cruise Terminal due to issues with being able to reach the ship's power connector, exacerbating concerns from local residents over pollution resulting from cruise ship operations at the cruise terminal. After upgrades to the Brooklyn Cruise Terminal, MSC Meraviglia was able to connect to shore power in Brooklyn for the first time in October 2025.

== Operational history ==
In June 2015, MSC Cruises opened bookings for MSC Meraviglia's inaugural 2017 season. MSC Meraviglia was delivered to MSC Cruises by STX France on May 31, 2017. Following her christening in Le Havre, France on 3 June, the ship entered service and initially operated in the western Mediterranean Sea.

The ship also cruised in Northern Europe in summer 2019, then repositioned to the United States for the first time, arriving in New York City on October 7, 2019. It did three sailings from New York in fall 2019, including two cruises to New England and Canada. The ship then relocated to Miami, from which it planned to operate western Caribbean cruises from November 2019 through April 2020. This was part of a North American expansion program by MSC.

MSC planned for the ship to return to Northern Europe for the summer of 2020, then return to New York City in the fall and back to Miami in late 2020.

=== COVID-19 pandemic ===
On 26 February 2020, during the COVID-19 pandemic in Mexico, Mexican authorities granted permission for MSC Meraviglia, registered in Malta, to dock in Cozumel, Quintana Roo, because she carried a passenger presumed to be infected with COVID-19. The ship was previously denied access to ports in Jamaica and the Cayman Islands. Two cases of common seasonal flu were found.

=== Post-COVID ===
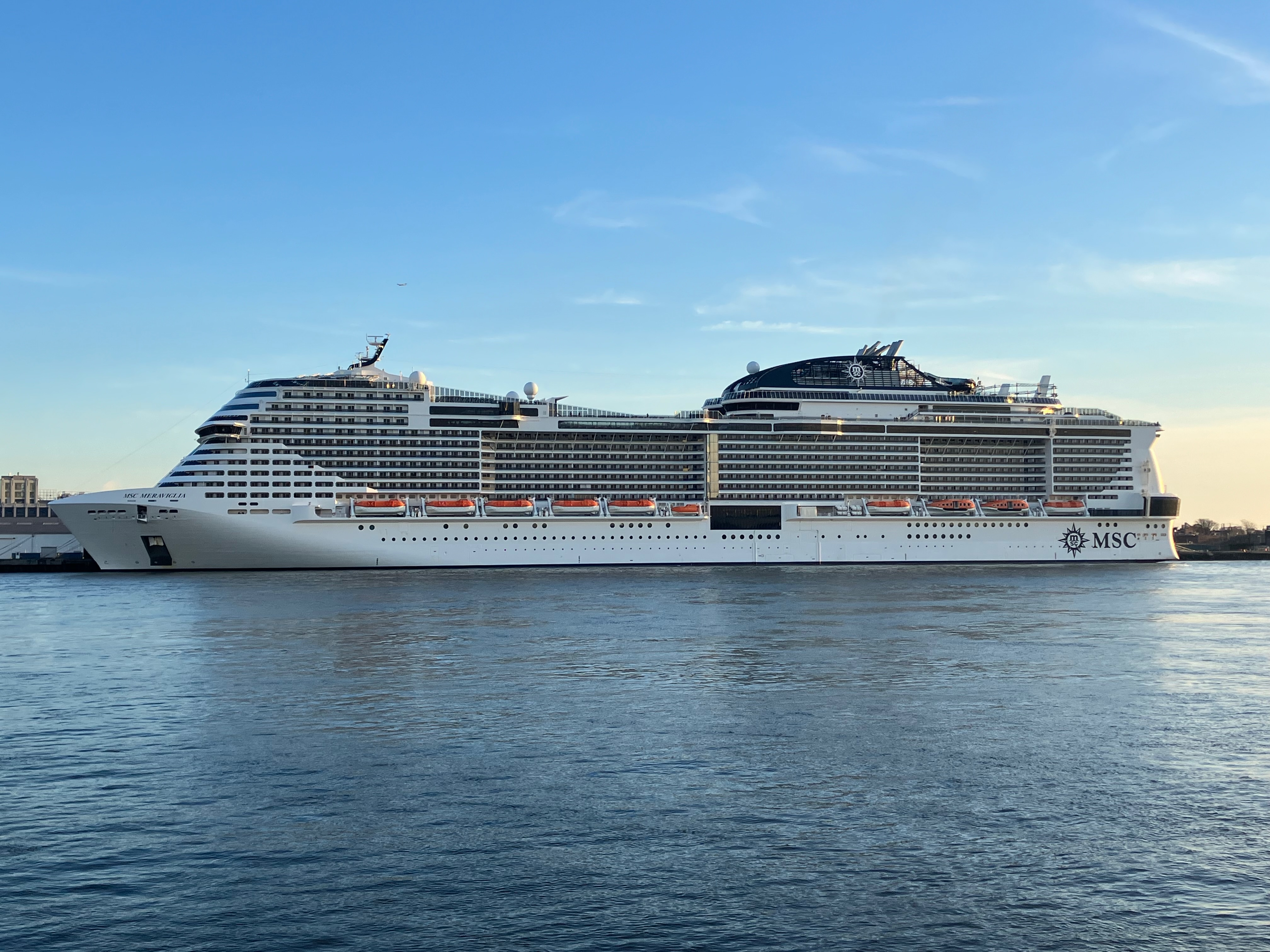
MSC Meraviglia docked in Brooklyn on December 16, 2023

MSC Meraviglia restarted operations after COVID in August 2021, with cruises from Miami. In 2022, MSC Meraviglia operated cruises from Barcelona.

Starting in April 2023, MSC Meraviglia began operating year-round from the Brooklyn Cruise Terminal in New York City, with cruises to the Caribbean and Bermuda. It has also operated cruise itineraries from New York City to Canada and New England during autumn months.

In May 2024, MSC Meraviglia arrived in Brooklyn with a dead 44-foot mature female sei whale lodged on its bow. Authorities and marine conservation officials conducted a necropsy and collected samples to investigate the circumstances of the whale's death.

In May 2025, the ship underwent repairs in Portland, Maine, which included replacing propeller blades.

In August 2025, MSC announced plans to relocate the ship out of Brooklyn in April 2026, with itineraries in Europe during the summer of 2026 and then it will operate out of Miami during the winter of 2027. In the summer of 2027, it will operate out of Southampton.

In March 2026, the ship reported serious issues with its plumbing and sewage disposal system, although its itinerary was not effected.
