= Miss Grand Japan 2023 =

9th Miss Grand Japan competition, beauty pageant edition

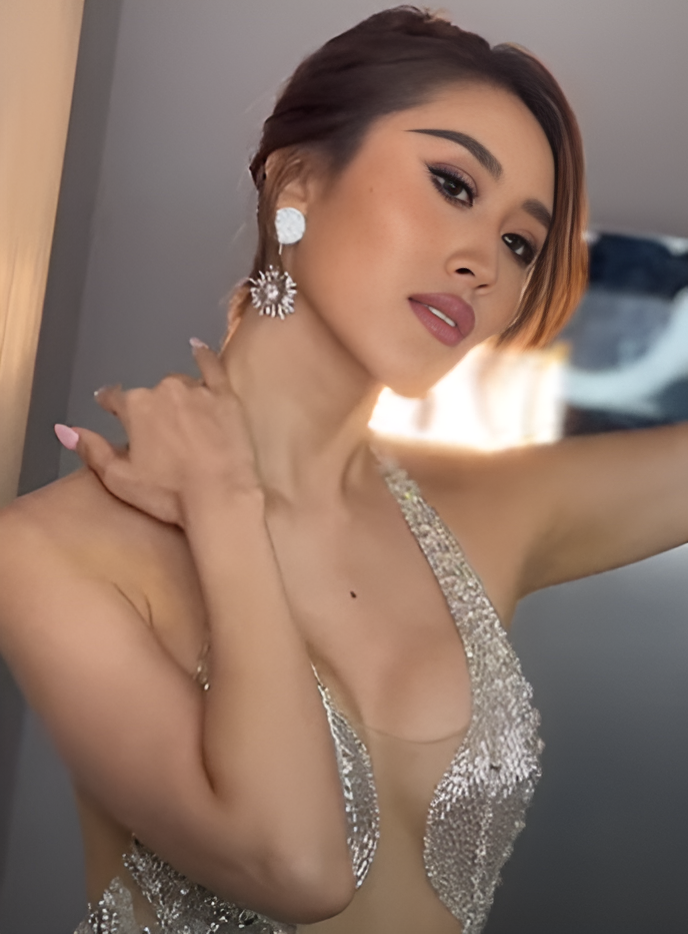
- Yayoi Machida, the winner of the contest
- Date: 16 July 2023
- Venue: Tokyo FM Hall, Chiyoda, Tokyo
- Broadcaster: YouTube
- Entrants: 14
- Placements: 7
- Winner: Yayoi Machida (Tokyo)
- Congeniality: Karina Yamada (Chiba)

External videos
- Miss Grand Japan 2023 & Mr. Gay Japan 2023: Grand final coronation, on July 16, 2023, YouTube video

Miss Grand Japan 2023 (Japanese: 2023 ミス・グランド・ジャパン) was the ninth edition of the Miss Grand Japan pageant, held on July 16, 2023, at the Tokyo FM Hall of the Tokyo FM Center in Chiyoda, Tokyo. Fourteen candidates who qualified for the national pageant via an audition performed in March 2023 competed for the title, and a 26-year-old Tokyo-based Entrepreneur, Yayoi Machida, was elected the winner, and obtained right to represent Japan at the international parent contest, Miss Grand International 2023, to be held in Ho Chi Minh City, Vietnam, on October 25.

The contest was run concurrently with the second edition of the Mister Gay Japan pageant, Mister Gay Japan 2023.

== Background ==
After the end of the Miss Grand Japan 2022, Miss Grand Japan Inc. began to open an application for the 2023 national pageant to select the final candidates for such; an application was officially opened in August, with the deadline on December 31, 2022. An initial profile screening was then done to select the qualified applicants to attend an actual physical audition performed in March.

== Result ==
Position	Delegate
Miss Grand Japan 2023	Tokyo – Yayoi Machida
1st runner-up	Chiba – Karina Yamada
2nd runner-up	Nara – Yuka Oyama
3rd runner-up	Osaka – Taeko Yoshida
4th runner-up	Chiba – Yuki Furihata
Top 7	Ibaraki – Mizuki Ueda; Osaka – Saki Inoue
Special awards
Best in Social Media	Nara – Yuka Oyama
Best in Swimwear	Tokyo – Miyuki Nozawa
Best in Evening Gown	Tokyo – Yayoi Machida
Miss Popular	Tokyo – Yayoi Machida
Miss Peace	Chiba – Yuki Furihata
Miss Friendship	Chiba – Karina Yamada
Mix Chanel Award	Tokyo – Yayoi Machida

== Candidates ==
14 candidates competed for the title.

Code	Prefectures	Candidate	Age	Height
MGJ01	Ibaraki	Mizuki Ueda	25	1.58 m (5 ft 2 in)
MGJ02	Kanagawa	Saho Suenaga	29	1.63 m (5 ft 4 in)
MGJ03	Tokyo	Midori Sawano	28	1.69 m (5 ft 6 1/2 in)
MGJ04	Chiba	Yuki Furihata	28	1.68 m (5 ft 6 in)
MGJ05	Osaka	Taeko Yoshida	23	1.70 m (5 ft 7 in)
MGJ06	Tokyo	Miyuki Nozawa	27	1.71 m (5 ft 7 1/2 in)
MGJ07	Osaka	Saki Inoue	27	1.77 m (5 ft 9 1/2 in)
MGJ08	Osaka	Mami Shinoki	24	1.73 m (5 ft 8 in)
MGJ09	Tokyo	Yayoi Machida	26	1.71 m (5 ft 7 1/2 in)
MGJ10	Nara	Yuka Oyama	25	1.71 m (5 ft 7 1/2 in)
MGJ11	Tokyo	Yurina Ishihara	25	1.71 m (5 ft 7 1/2 in)
MGJ12	Aichi	Megumi Oteki	22	1.69 m (5 ft 6 1/2 in)
MGJ13	Chiba	Karina Yamada	24	1.65 m (5 ft 5 in)
MGJ14	Chiba	Yukiko Hayashi	21	1.60 m (5 ft 3 in)
