= Symphony bridge =

Hypothetical type of bridge

A symphony bridge or bridge symphony is a bridge which combines the structural support systems of a suspension bridge, a cable-stayed bridge and a cantilever bridge. No such bridges have been built, nor are there any specific plans, although the method has been considered for several bridges in Norway. It was developed collaboratively by the Norwegian Public Roads Administration and the civil engineering consulting company Aas-Jakobsen as a means of building bridges with spans between 1,000 and 3,000 meters (3,300 and 9,800 ft).

The design is based on two separate roadways which are connected by crossbeams. A symphony bridge would have two pylons, which would be circular in hollow cross-section. The center of the bridge would be supported by a central cable (unlike the conventional two side cables of a suspension bridge) connected to the deck via hangers connected to the crossbeams. The cross-beams and hangers are triangular in form. On both sides of the suspension section, the bridge would be built as a cable-stayed bridge with cables from the pylon. The areas closest to the pylons would be constructed with cantilever support. The designers have stated that the bridge would allow for greater wind stability, more drag, faster construction time, lower cost, and increased access for inspections and maintenance.

For the Hålogaland Bridge, which is proposed to have a 1,345-meter (4,413 ft) long main span, a symphony bridge was considered but was discarded after it was deemed too expensive at a projected cost of 2,380 million Norwegian kroner (NOK), compared to NOK 1,860 for a suspension bridge. The proposed Storfjord Bridge could be built as a symphony bridge.
