= Miss Grand Japan 2018 =

4th edition of the Miss Grand Japan beauty pageant

- Date: July 30, 2018
- Venue: WOMB Club, Shibuya, Tokyo
- Entrants: 15
- Placements: 5
- Winner: Haruka Oda (Saitama)
- Congeniality: Honami Nishikawa (Chiba)
- Best in Swimsuit: Mariko Nakagawa (Chiba)

Miss Grand Japan 2018 (Japanese: 2018 ミス・グランド・ジャパン) was the 4th edition of the Miss Grand Japan pageant, held on July 30, 2018, at the WOMB Club, Shibuya, Tokyo. Fifteen contestants, who applied through an online application launched from December 24, 2017, to February 24, 2018, competed for the title.

At the end of the event, a 24-year-old model from Saitama, Haruka Oda, was elected the winner, while Rie Kuroki of Aichi and Kanami Tobita of Miyagi were named the runners-up. Haruka Oda later took part in the international parent stage, Miss Grand International 2018, held in Myanmar on October 25, 2018, and was named the fifth runner-up, making her the first Japanese candidate to reach the top 5 finalists in the said international event.

== Result ==
Position	Delegate
Miss Grand Japan 2018	03. Saitama – Haruka Oda
1st runner-up	04 Aichi – Rie Kuroki
2nd runner-up	09. Miyagi – Kanami Tobita
Top 5	07. Akita – Fuyumi Takahashi; 13. Chiba – Honami Nishikawa
Special awards
Best in Social Media	16. Tokyo – Mina Yoshida
People's Choice	14. Aichi – Platon Mary Eri
Best in Swimsuit	10. Chiba – Mariko Nakagawa
Best in Evening Gown	13. Chiba – Honami Nishikawa
Miss Congeniality	13. Chiba – Honami Nishikawa
Miss Showroom	03. Saitama – Haruka Oda

== Contestants ==
Initially, seventeen contestants qualified for the national final round, but two withdrew, making the final of fifteen contestants.

No.	Prefecture	Candidate		Age
No.	Prefecture	Romanized name	Japanese name	Age
01.	Tokyo	Emika Aoki	Withdrew/Eliminated	
02.	Kanagawa	Haruka Izaki	伊崎 遥	20
03.	Saitama	Haruka Oda	小田 はるか	23
04.	Aichi	Rie Kuroki	黒木 莉恵	23
05.	Chiba	Ami Sugano	菅野 亜未	23
06.	Shiga	Sakiko Takada	高田 咲子	26
07.	Akita	Fuyumi Takahashi	髙橋 ふゆみ	23
08.	Fukuoka	Aimi Tanaka	田中 愛美	22
09.	Miyagi	Kanami Tobita	飛田 叶美	25
10.	Chiba	Mariko Nakagawa	中川 真理子	26
11.	Tokyo	Yuri Nakagawa	中川 結理	25
12.	Fukuoka	Satsuki Nakano	中野 皐月	27
13.	Chiba	Honami Nishikawa	西川 穂奈美	27
14.	Aichi	Platon Mary Eri	プラトン・メリー・恵梨	23
15.	Tokyo	Sakurako Yamada	山田 桜子	23
16.	Tokyo	Mina Yoshida	吉田 美奈	26
17.	Saitama	Natsumi Yanase	Withdrew/Eliminated	
