= Miss Grand Japan 2015 =

1st edition of the Miss Grand Japan beauty pageant

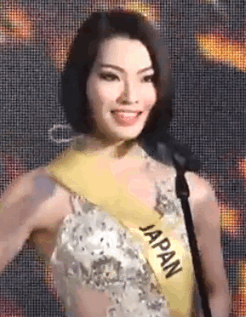
- Ayaka Tanaka, the winner of the contest
- Date: August 24, 2015
- Venue: Happo-en, Minato, Tokyo
- Entrants: 22
- Placements: 10
- Winner: Ayaka Tanaka (Saitama)
- Congeniality: Chisato Nagayasu (Kanagawa)
- Photogenic: Hirasawa Natsuka (Tokyo)
- Miss Face of Beauty: Miyu Tanaka (Hyōgo)

Miss Grand Japan 2015 (Japanese: 2015ミス・グランド・ジャパン) was the first edition of the Miss Grand Japan pageant, held on August 24, 2015, at the Happo-en, Minato, Tokyo. Twenty-two contestants competed for the title, of whom a 25-year-old nurse representing Saitama, Ayaka Tanaka, was announced the winner, while Miyu Tanaka of Hyōgo was named Miss Face of Beauty Japan 2015.

Ayaka Tanaka later represented Japan in the Miss Grand International 2015 pageant held in Bangkok, Thailand, on October 25, 2015, and won the Best Evening Gown award as well as was placed among the top 10 finalists. Meanwhile, Miyu Tanaka competed internationally at the Face of Beauty International 2015 contest in Taiwan, where she qualified to the top 15 finals.

The event was organized by Intergo Co., Ltd. and Views Co., Ltd, (株式会社ヴューズ) with Eriko Yoshii and Ayako Suzuki as the companies' representatives, respectively.

== Pageant ==
An application for the Miss Grand Japan 2015 was launched on April 1, 2015. Through the seminar and online screening, only 32 applicants qualified for the semi-final round, held on July 4, 2015, at the Yurakucho station square, where the final 19 contestants were elected. Together with the 3 revenge match winners, determined later at the Happo-en, completed the twenty-two finalists, who then entered the national final round held at the Happo-en on August 24.

In the grand final round, the top 10 finalists, determined earlier in the preliminary competition held on August 23, were announced, followed by the top 5 finalists, who then competed in the question and answer section. Afterward, Miss Grand Japan 2015 as well as other supplemental title winners were named.

== Result ==
Position	Delegate
Miss Grand Japan 2015	18. Saitama – Ayaka Tanaka
Miss Face of Beauty Japan 2015	16. Hyōgo – Miyu Tanaka
1st runner-up	21. Aichi – Mao Kaneko
2nd runner-up	19. Chiba – Nanami Tomita
Top 5	11. Tokyo – Fuyuki Fujiwara; 15. Kanagawa – Mayu Kubota
Top 10	01. Osaka – Airi Yamamoto; No data available; No data available; No data available
Special awards
Miss Friendship	17. Kanagawa – Chisato Nagayasu
Miss Photogenic	13. Tokyo – Hirasawa Natsuka
People's Choice Award	11. Tokyo – Fuyuki Fujiwara
Best in Social Media	11. Tokyo – Fuyuki Fujiwara
Best in Swimsuit	18. Saitama – Ayaka Tanaka

== Contestants ==
Twenty-two contestants competed for the title.

No.	Prefectures	Candidate		Age	Height
No.	Prefectures	Romanized name	Japanese name	Age	Height
01.	Osaka	Airi Yamamoto	山本 愛莉	23	1.61 m (5 ft 3 1/2 in)
02.	Akita	Maiko Ishikawa	石川 真依子	25	1.60 m (5 ft 3 in)
03.	Saitama	Aiko Takada	高田 愛子	26	1.66 m (5 ft 5 1/2 in)
04.	Fukuoka	Chisa Higuchi	樋口 千紗	25	1.68 m (5 ft 6 in)
05.	Tokyo	Seira Inoue	井上 セイラ	18	1.68 m (5 ft 6 in)
06.	Wakayama	Mari Takeuchi	竹内 麻莉	20	1.66 m (5 ft 5 1/2 in)
07.	Hokkaido	Kazuyo Abe	阿部 和代	23	1.71 m (5 ft 7 1/2 in)
08.	Nagasaki	Matsunaga Sawako	松永 佐和子	23	1.70 m (5 ft 7 in)
09.	Tokyo	Maria Ueyama	上山 真里愛	20	1.70 m (5 ft 7 in)
10.	Tokyo	Uruma Ayame	閏間 あやめ	22	1.64 m (5 ft 4 1/2 in)
11.	Tokyo	Fuyuki Fujiwara	藤原 冬姫	26	1.68 m (5 ft 6 in)
12.	Tokyo	Shima Maki	志摩 マキ	23	1.65 m (5 ft 5 in)
13.	Tokyo	Hirasawa Natsuka	平澤 夏加	25	1.70 m (5 ft 7 in)
14.	Tokyo	Emiri Tsukui	津久井 えみり	21	1.70 m (5 ft 7 in)
15.	Kanagawa	Mayu Kubota	窪田 麻佑	26	1.72 m (5 ft 7 1/2 in)
16.	Hyōgo	Miyu Tanaka	田中 実結	21	1.72 m (5 ft 7 1/2 in)
17.	Kanagawa	Chisato Nagayasu	永易 千怜	23	1.72 m (5 ft 7 1/2 in)
18.	Saitama	Ayaka Tanaka	田中綾郁	25	1.70 m (5 ft 7 in)
19.	Chiba	Nanami Tomita	冨田 七々海	24	1.70 m (5 ft 7 in)
20.	Tokyo	Miki Shima	志摩 ミキ	19	1.65 m (5 ft 5 in)
21.	Aichi	Mao Kaneko	兼子真央	25	1.74 m (5 ft 8 1/2 in)
22.	Miyagi	Airi Miyata	宮田 愛理	20	1.65 m (5 ft 5 in)
