= Miss Grand Japan 2024 =

10th Miss Grand Japan competition

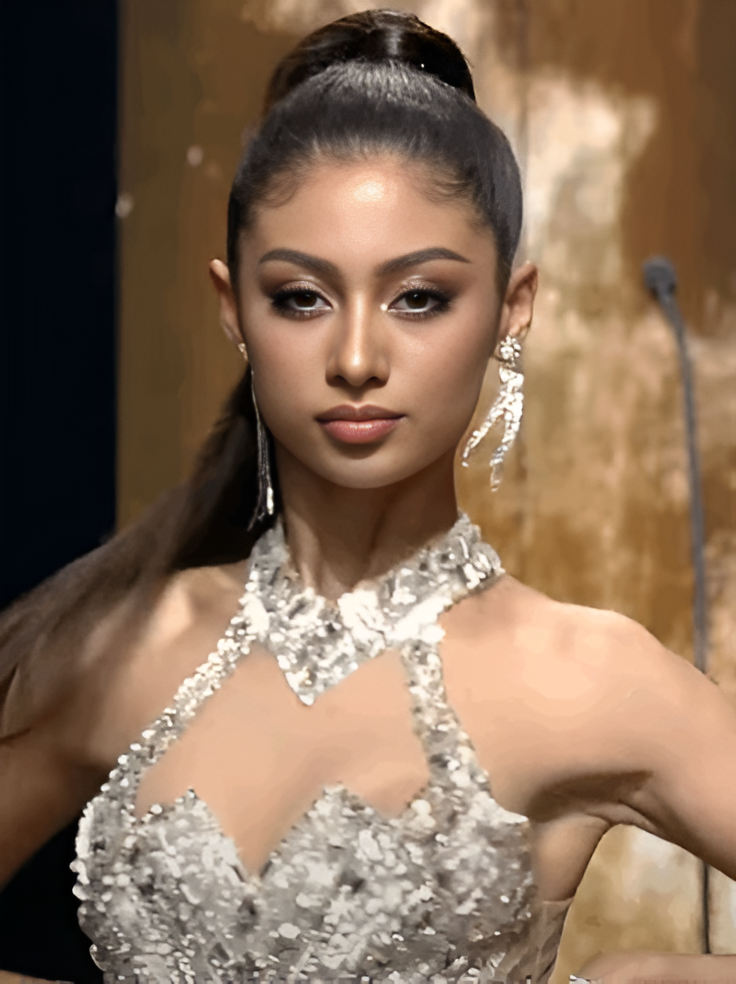
- Naomi Shigemitsu, the winner of the contest
- Date: 20 July 2024
- Venue: New Piea Hall, Minato, Tokyo
- Broadcaster: YouTube
- Entrants: 20
- Placements: 8
- Winner: Luma Naomi Shigemitsu (Aichi)
- Miss Popular: Anna Hayakawa (Kanagawa)

External videos
- Grand final competition

Miss Grand Japan 2024 (Japanese: 2024 ミス・グランド・ジャパン) was the 10th edition of the Miss Grand Japan pageant, held on 20 July 2024, at the New Piea Hall, Minato, Tokyo. Twenty candidates, who qualified for the national round through the online profile screening, competed for the title. Of whom, a 21-year-old Japanese Brazilian real estate consultant from Aichi, Luma Naomi Shigemitsu, was announced the winner. Luna represented Japan at the international stage of Miss Grand International 2024 held on 25 October 2024 in Thailand, and was placed among the top 20 finalists.

The grand final round of the pageant was also attended by Nawat Itsaragrisil and Teresa Chaivisut, president and vice president of Miss Grand International.

== Background ==
After the end of the 2023 international tournament in Vietnam, the Miss Grand Japan management team led by Eriko Yoshii launched an online application for the 2024 national pageant on 2 November 2023, with a deadline of 31 December 2023. Through the profile screening and virtual interview, 20 applicants qualified for the national round held on 20 July 2024 at the New Piea Hall, Minato, Tokyo.

== Result ==
Miss Grand Japan 2024 competition result by prefecture of origin
Color key:
Winner	1st runner-up
2nd runner-up	3rd runner-up
4th runner-up	Top 8
Unplaced	No representative

Placement	Candidate
Miss Grand Japan 2024	Aichi – Luma Naomi Shigemitsu
1st runner-up	Japanese communities in USA – Erika Ishibashi
2nd runner-up	Kanagawa – Anna Hayakawa
3rd runner-up	Hokkaido – Sayo Nodake
4th runner-up	Tochigi – Miho Ogawa
Top 8	Japanese communities in Italy – Shiori Sato; Kanagawa – Mao Eguchi; Osaka – Yukako Sakata
Special awards
Best in Mysta Award	Kanagawa – Anna Hayakawa
Best in Live Award	Osaka – Yukako Sakata
Best in Swimwear	Hokkaido – Sayo Nodake
Best in Social Media	Osaka – Yukako Sakata
Best in Evening Gown	Aichi – Luma Naomi Shigemitsu
Best in Performer	Osaka – Yuzuki Hirano
Miss Popular	Kanagawa – Anna Hayakawa
Miss Peace	Tottori – Midori Kotani

== Contestants ==
Twenty candidates will compete for the title.

Prefectures/City/etc.	Candidate	
Prefectures/City/etc.	Romanized name	Japanese name
Aichi	Luma Naomi Shigemitsu	重光 ルマ ナオミ
Chiba	Kilica	霧華
Fukui	Himawari Kojima	小嶋 向日葵
Kanagawa	Aimi McCormack	マコーマック 愛美
Kanagawa	Anna Hayakawa	早川 杏奈
Kanagawa	Mao Eguchi	江口 真央
Hokkaido	Sayo Nodake	野嶽沙世
Hyōgo	Yuka Hatanaka	畠中 優香
Japanese communities in Italy	Shiori Sato	佐藤 汐莉
Japanese communities in USA	Erika Ishibashi	石橋 恵莉加
Okayama	Mako Ohara	尾原 真子
Osaka	Yukako Sakata	坂田 侑嘉子
Osaka	Yuzuki Hirano	平野 柚希
Saga	Taeka Katano	片野 妙香
Tochigi	Miho Ogawa	小川 美穂
Tokushima	Kyoka Yuasa	湯浅 京香
Tokyo	Reina Yokokura	横倉 麗奈
Tokyo	Sasha Takahashi	高橋 サーシャ
Tottori	Midori Kotani	小谷 緑
Yamanashi	Eresa Yakoh	谷古宇 愛麗
