= Hålogaland Bridge =

Hålogaland Bridge Hålogalandsbrua
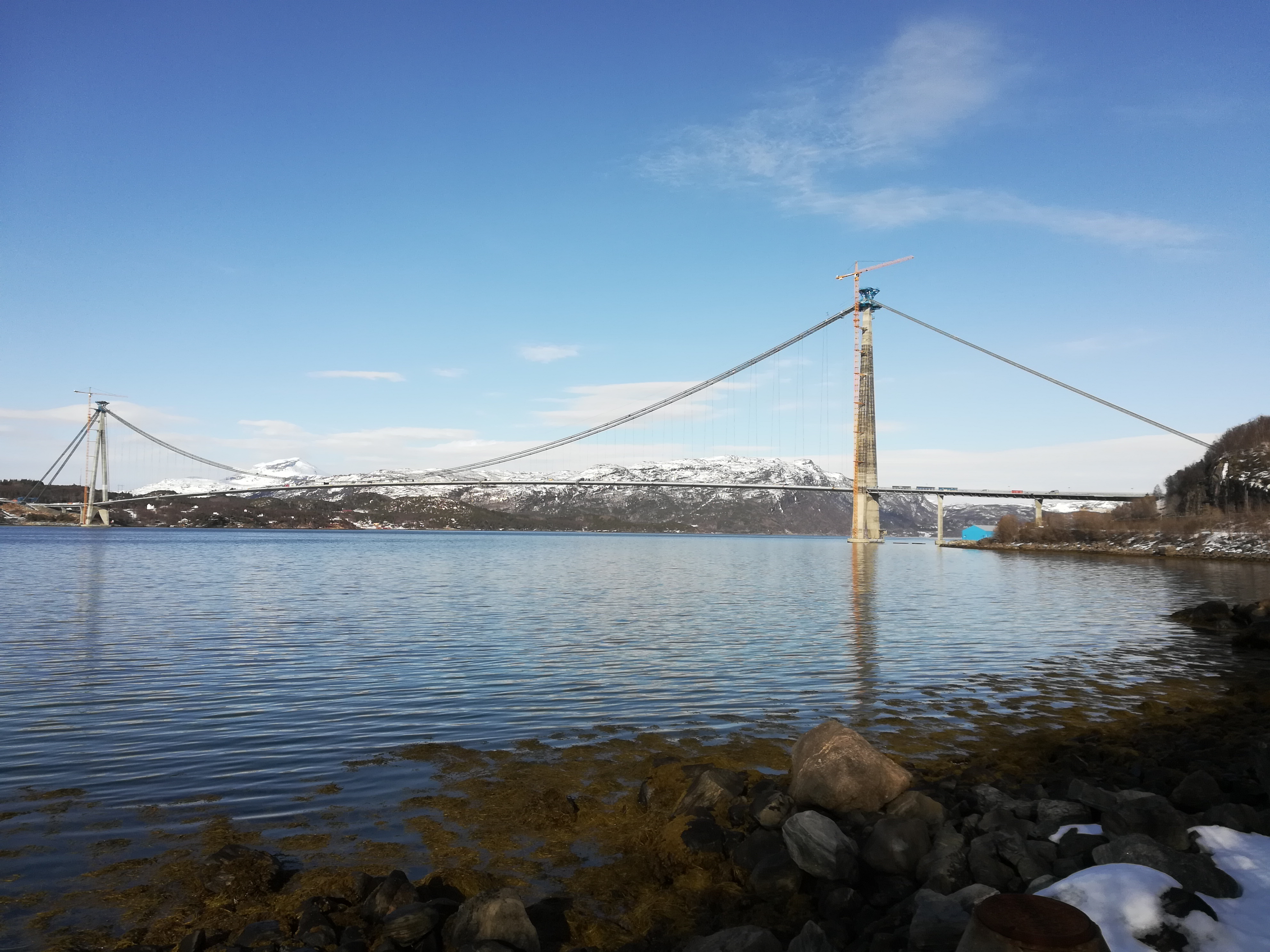
- The Hålogaland Bridge, under construction in April 2018
- Coordinates: 68.4534°N 17.4823°E
- Carries: E06
- Crosses: Rombaken fjord
- Locale: Narvik Municipality, Norway
- Named for: Hålogaland
- Website: haalogalandsbrua.no

Characteristics
- Design: Suspension bridge
- Material: Reinforced concrete and Steel
- Total length: 1,533 metres (5,030 ft)
- Longest span: 1,145 metres (3,757 ft)
- No. of spans: 1
- No. of lanes: 2

History
- Construction start: 18 February 2013
- Construction end: 2018
- Construction cost: 2.2 billion kr
- Opened: 9 December 2018
- Inaugurated: 9 December 2018
- Replaces: Rombak Bridge (E6 Highway rerouted)

Statistics
- Toll: Yes

Location
- Interactive map of Hålogaland Bridge

The Hålogaland Bridge (Norwegian: Hålogalandsbrua) is a suspension bridge which crosses the Rombaksfjorden in Narvik Municipality in Nordland county, Norway. It is the second-longest bridge span in Norway. The bridge is part of the European Route E6 highway. It was built to shorten the driving distance from the town of Narvik to the village of Bjerkvik by 17 kilometres (11 mi) and from Narvik to Bjørnfjell via European Route E10 by 5 kilometres (3.1 mi). The bridge cost 2.2 billion kr. Financing came from a mix of state grants and tolls.

The bridge lies above the Arctic Circle and is the longest suspension bridge within the Arctic Circle at the time of its construction. Construction of the bridge was featured on Season 1 Episode 4 of the Science Channel show Building Giants, titled Arctic Mega Bridge. Another suspension bridge, the Rombak Bridge, is nearby further east through the fjord.

Construction began on 18 February 2013 and was completed in 2018. The inauguration ceremony was held on 9 December 2018, and the bridge was opened to traffic that same day.

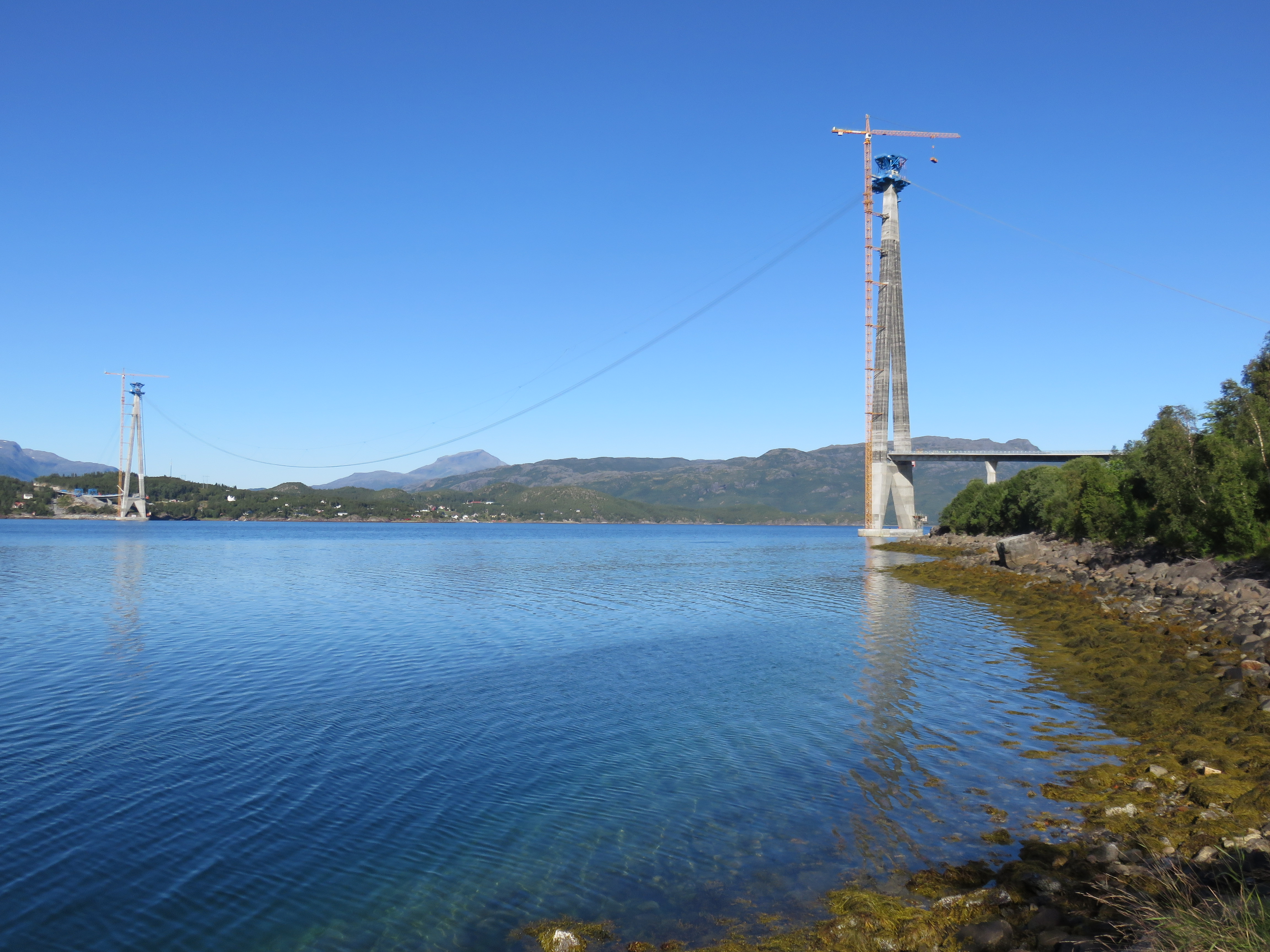
The Hålogaland Bridge under construction, August 2016

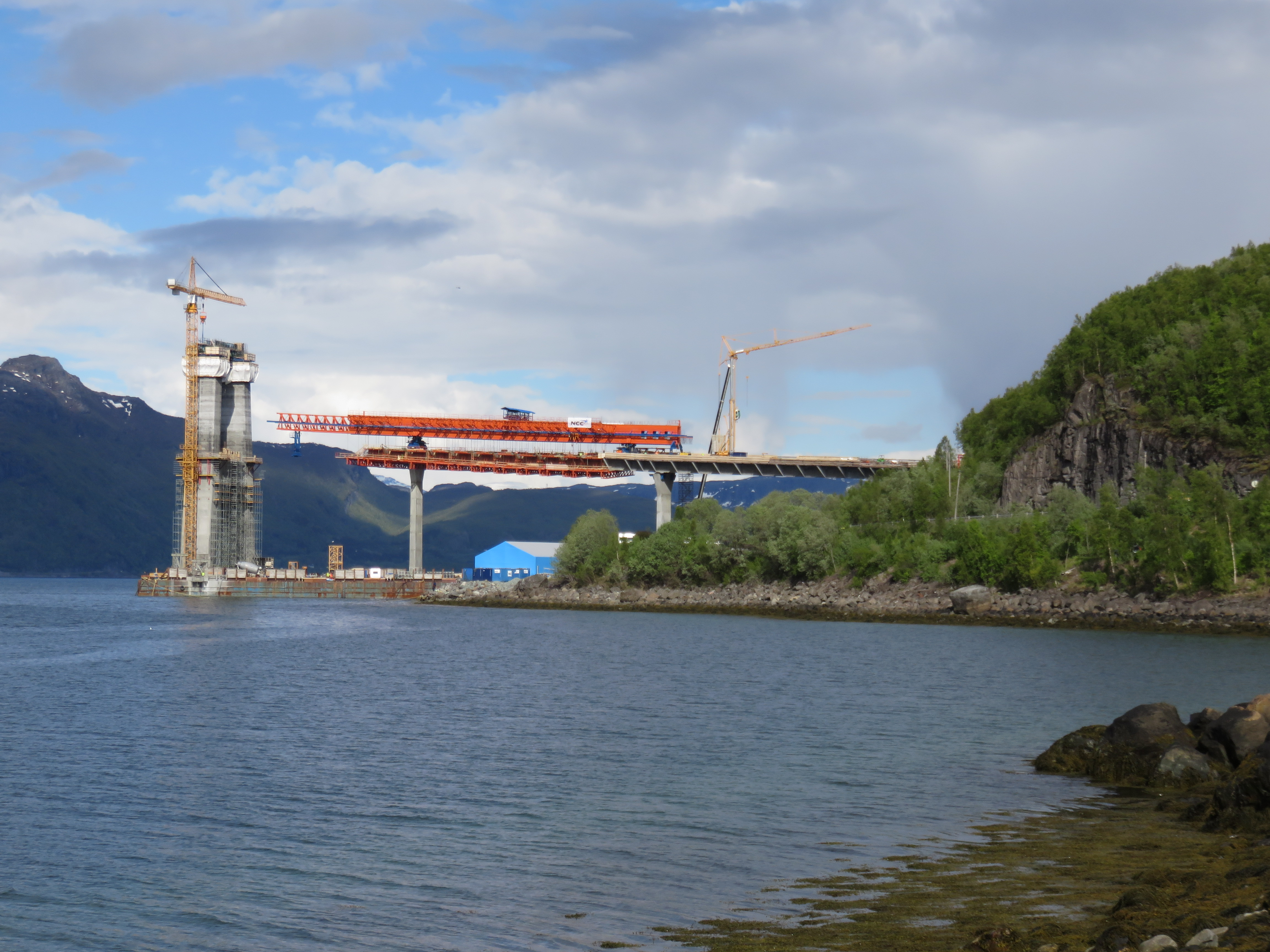
Construction of the bridge, June 2015

== History ==
The bridge was originally planned to be either a suspension bridge or a symphony bridge (a combination of a suspension bridge, a cable-stayed bridge and a cantilever bridge), but the latter was dropped in 2008, as it would cost 520 million kr more. The Norwegian Public Roads Administration estimated the cost of a suspension bridge in 2008 to 1,860 million kr. In addition to the bridge, a tunnel between Trældal and Leirvika was planned at an estimated cost of 85 million kr. The administration also worked on a method which would shorten the main span from 1,345 to 1,120 metres (4,413 to 3,675 ft) by placing pylons in the fjord. The bridge was inaugurated on 9 December 2018 and was opened for traffic the same day.

== Financing ==
As part of the comprehensive financing of the bridge, Narvik Airport, Framnes, was closed on 1 April 2017, one year before the opening. The bridge shortens travel time to Harstad/Narvik Airport, Evenes, from 60 to 40 minutes, and local politicians have accepted the deal. The Ofoten Regional Council has estimated savings of 840 million kr over 30 years should the airport be closed. In October 2009, State Secretary Erik Lahnstein stated that he was unhappy with the calculations, as they were based on unrealistic presumptions. In September 2010, Minister of Transport and Communications Magnhild Meltveit Kleppa stated that the state would issue a "several hundred million kroner" grant. On 25 May 2012, Kleppa announced that the government would grant 1.6 billion kr for the bridge, which would supplement 850 million kr in tolls and a minor amount from Narvik Municipality. A toll station with a 43 kr toll was opened in September 2015 along the old road, and a toll station with a 113 kr toll was opened on the north access road after the bridge opened.

== Construction ==
Construction started on 18 February 2013 and was built by the Chinese company Sichuan Road and Bridge Group. The project was connected to the Belt and Road Initiative and also involved the Serbian firm VNG.

The expected opening was in the spring of 2018, although due to various delays, it was opened for traffic on 9 December 2018.

In addition to the Hålogaland Bridge, there are a total of 4.9 kilometres (3.0 mi) of new road, two new smaller tunnels and a new 1.1-kilometre (0.68 mi) long avalanche protection tunnel on the old road in Trældal, north of Narvik.

The project comprised:

- The Hålogaland Bridge, 1,533 metres (5,030 ft)
- Construction of 1.4 kilometres (0.87 mi) of road on the Narvik side
- The Ornes tunnel, 270 metres (890 ft), on the Narvik side
- Construction of 3.5 kilometres (2.2 mi) of road at Øyjord
- The Storlikoll tunnel, 330 metres (1,080 ft), at Øyjord
- The Trældal tunnel, 1.1 kilometres (0.68 mi)
