= Miss Grand Japan 2016 =

2nd edition of the Miss Grand Japan beauty pageant

- Date: September 11, 2016
- Venue: Bunka Fashion College, Shibuya, Tokyo
- Entrants: 20
- Placements: 10
- Winner: Ayaka Sato (Aichi)
- Congeniality: Riri Yoshida (Chiba)
- Photogenic: Shiori Takashima (Aichi)

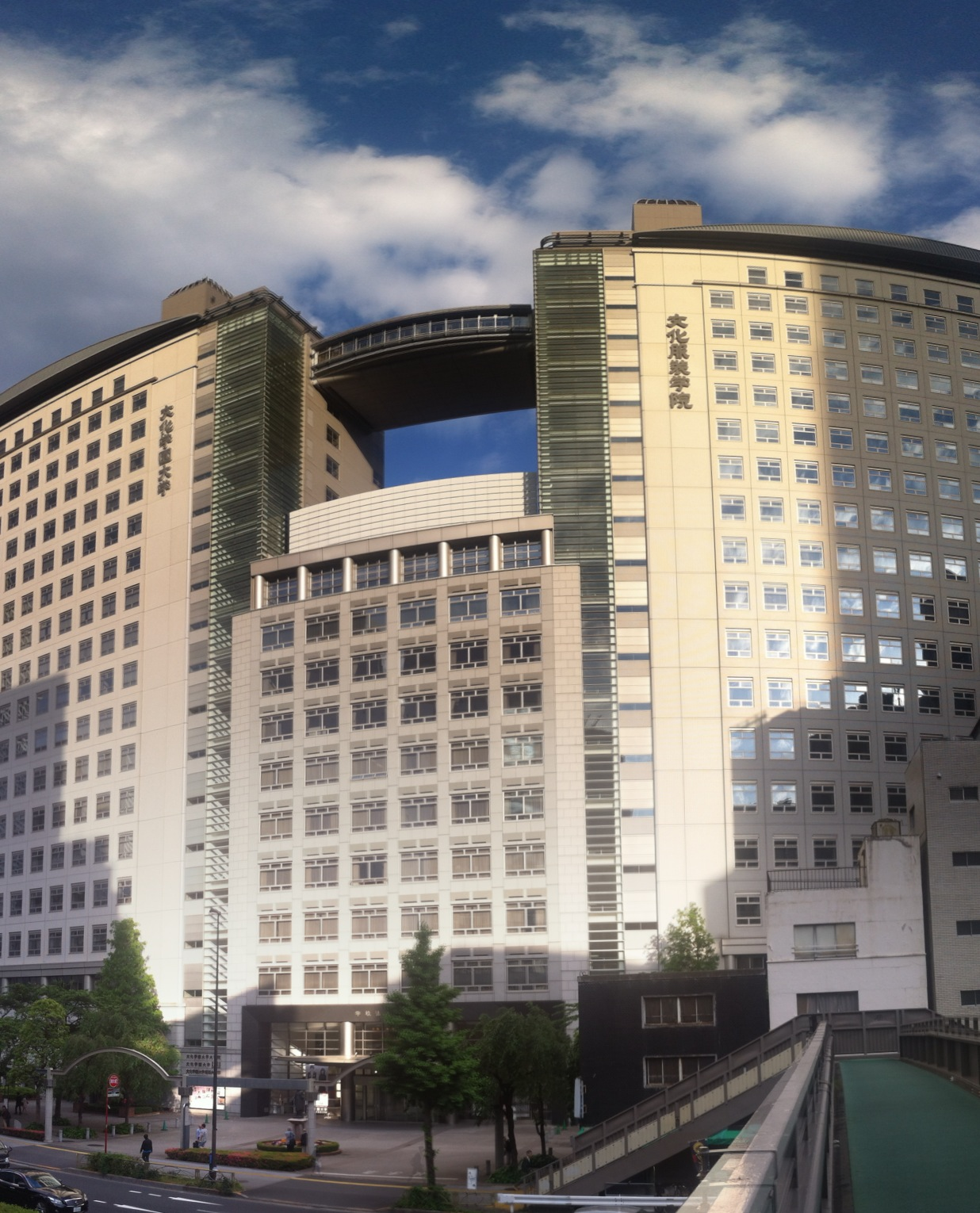
Bunka Fashion College, the venue of the contest.

Miss Grand Japan 2016 (Japanese: 2016 ミス・グランド・ジャパン) was the second edition of the Miss Grand Japan pageant, held on September 11, 2016, at the Bunka Fashion College, Shibuya, Tokyo. Twenty contestants from different prefectures competed for the title. At the end of the event, a 27-year-old company employee from Aichi, Ayaka Sato, was announced the winner. Her court included Erea Taira of Okinawa and Riri Yoshida of Chiba. The event was also attended Miss Grand International 2015, Claire Elizabeth Parker of Australia.

Ayaka Sato later represented Japan at the Miss Grand International 2016 pageant, held in Las Vegas, Nevada, but was unplaced.

In this edition, the regional preliminary rounds to select the national finalist was also held in Hokkaido, Tōhoku, and Tokyo.

== Result ==
Position	Delegate
Miss Grand Japan 2016	11. Aichi – Ayako Sato
1st runner-up	15. Okinawa − Erea Taira
2nd runner-up	01. Chiba – Riri Yoshida
Top 5	18. Aichi – Yurika Watanabe; 19. Aichi – Shiori Takashima
Top 10	03. Iwate – Aya Shishido; 05. Kanagawa – Natsuki Suzuki; 09. Nara – Maria Nakayama; 13. Akita – Ayumi Sato (Note: Automatically qualified to the top 10 round after winning the Miss Popular Vote.); 17. Chiba – Natsuki Sato
Special awards
Miss Friendship	01. Chiba – Riri Yoshida
Miss Photogenic	19. Aichi – Shiori Takashima
Miss Popular	13. Akita – Ayumi Sato
Miss Social Media	08. Kanagawa – Rika Matsuo
Miss Bikini	20. Kyoto – Chizu Yokoe

== Contestants ==
Twenty contestants competed for the title.

No.	Prefecture	Candidate		Age	Height
No.	Prefecture	Romanized name	Japanese name	Age	Height
01.	Chiba	Riri Yoshida	吉田 吏里	26	1.63 m (5 ft 4 in)
02.	Hokkaido	Mai Miyata	宮田 真衣	25	1.65 m (5 ft 5 in)
03.	Iwate	Aya Shishido	宍戸 亜弥	27	1.65 m (5 ft 5 in)
04.	Miyagi	Hiromi Morita	森田 博美	27	1.65 m (5 ft 5 in)
05.	Kanagawa	Natsuki Suzuki	鈴木 夏生	24	1.65 m (5 ft 5 in)
06.	Kagoshima	Lina Tobimatsu	飛松 利菜	21	1.66 m (5 ft 5 1/2 in)
07.	Miyagi	Hitimi Sato	佐藤 仁美	26	1.67 m (5 ft 5 1/2 in)
08.	Kanagawa	Rika Matsuo	松尾 梨華	22	1.67 m (5 ft 5 1/2 in)
09.	Nara	Maria Nakayama	中山 まりあ	23	1.69 m (5 ft 6 1/2 in)
10.	Hokkaido	Saori Kawahara	川原 沙織	26	1.69 m (5 ft 6 1/2 in)
11.	Aichi	Ayako Sato	佐藤 彩花	27	1.70 m (5 ft 7 in)
12.	Hokkaido	Ayako Momiyama	籾山 采子	21	1.71 m (5 ft 7 1/2 in)
13.	Akita	Ayumi Sato	佐藤 歩美	25	1.72 m (5 ft 7 1/2 in)
14.	Aichi	Shiori Suzuki	鈴木 詩織	25	1.72 m (5 ft 7 1/2 in)
15.	Okinawa	Erea Taira	平良 絵玲亜	27	1.73 m (5 ft 8 in)
16.	Kanagawa	Ruri Chikuma	竹間 瑠莉	24	1.73 m (5 ft 8 in)
17.	Chiba	Natsuki Sato	佐藤 夏希	25	1.75 m (5 ft 9 in)
19.	Aichi	Yurika Watanabe	渡辺 由梨佳	25	1.75 m (5 ft 9 in)
19.	Aichi	Shiori Takashima	高島 詩緒莉	26	1.75 m (5 ft 9 in)
20.	Kyoto	Chizu Yokoe	横江 千寿	27	1.75 m (5 ft 9 in)
