= MSC Bellissima =

Cruise ship built in 2019

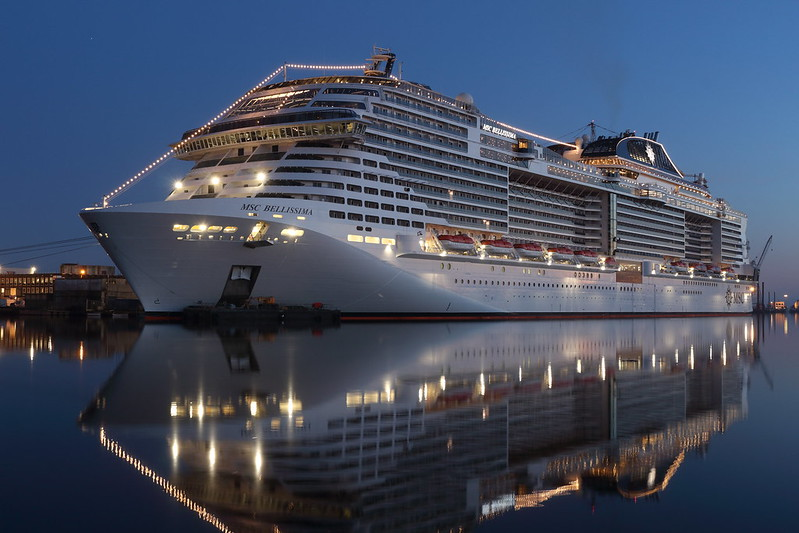
- MSC Bellissima in Saint-Nazaire (France) shipyard on 19 February 2019

History
- Name: MSC Bellissima
- Owner: MSC Cruises
- Operator: MSC Cruises
- Port of registry: Valletta, Malta
- Ordered: 20 March 2014
- Builder: Chantiers de l'Atlantique
- Laid down: 15 November 2017
- Launched: 14 June 2018
- Christened: 2 March 2019
- Acquired: 27 February 2019
- Maiden voyage: 4 March 2019
- In service: 4 March 2019
- Identification: Call sign: 9HA4902; IMO number: 9760524; MMSI number: 248992000
- Status: In service

General characteristics
- Class & type: Meraviglia-class cruise ship
- Tonnage: 171,598 GT
- Length: 315.83 m (1,036 ft 2 in)
- Beam: 43 m (141 ft 1 in)
- Draught: 8.75 m (28 ft 8 in)
- Decks: 18
- Installed power: 38,400 kW (51,500 hp)
- Propulsion: 2 × ABB Azipods
- Speed: 21.8 knots (40.4 km/h; 25.1 mph)
- Capacity: 4,500

MSC Bellissima is a cruise ship operated by MSC Cruises. She was constructed at the Chantiers de l'Atlantique in Saint-Nazaire, France.

The ship joined MSC Meraviglia in the company's Meraviglia class of cruise ships. She has a tonnage of 171,598 gross tonnage (GT) and a capacity of 4,500 passengers. The ship debuted in March 2019.

MSC Cruises announced the suspension of all North American itineraries until 30 June 2020 due to the COVID-19 pandemic.

== History ==
MSC Cruises and STX France cut the first steel of MSC Bellissima on 28 November 2016, with £750M investment. Her keel laying and coin ceremony happened on 15 November 2017. It also features 2,217 cabins and 1,418 balconies that can accommodate 5,686 guests, with the length of 315.8m and a width of 43m. On 14 June 2018, the ship was floated out. Her sea trials took place in December 2018. Andrea Bocelli, alongside his son, performed during the christening of the ship. The ship joined MSC Meraviglia in the company's Meraviglia class of cruise ships which it has a tonnage of 171,598 GT and a capacity of 4,500 passengers.

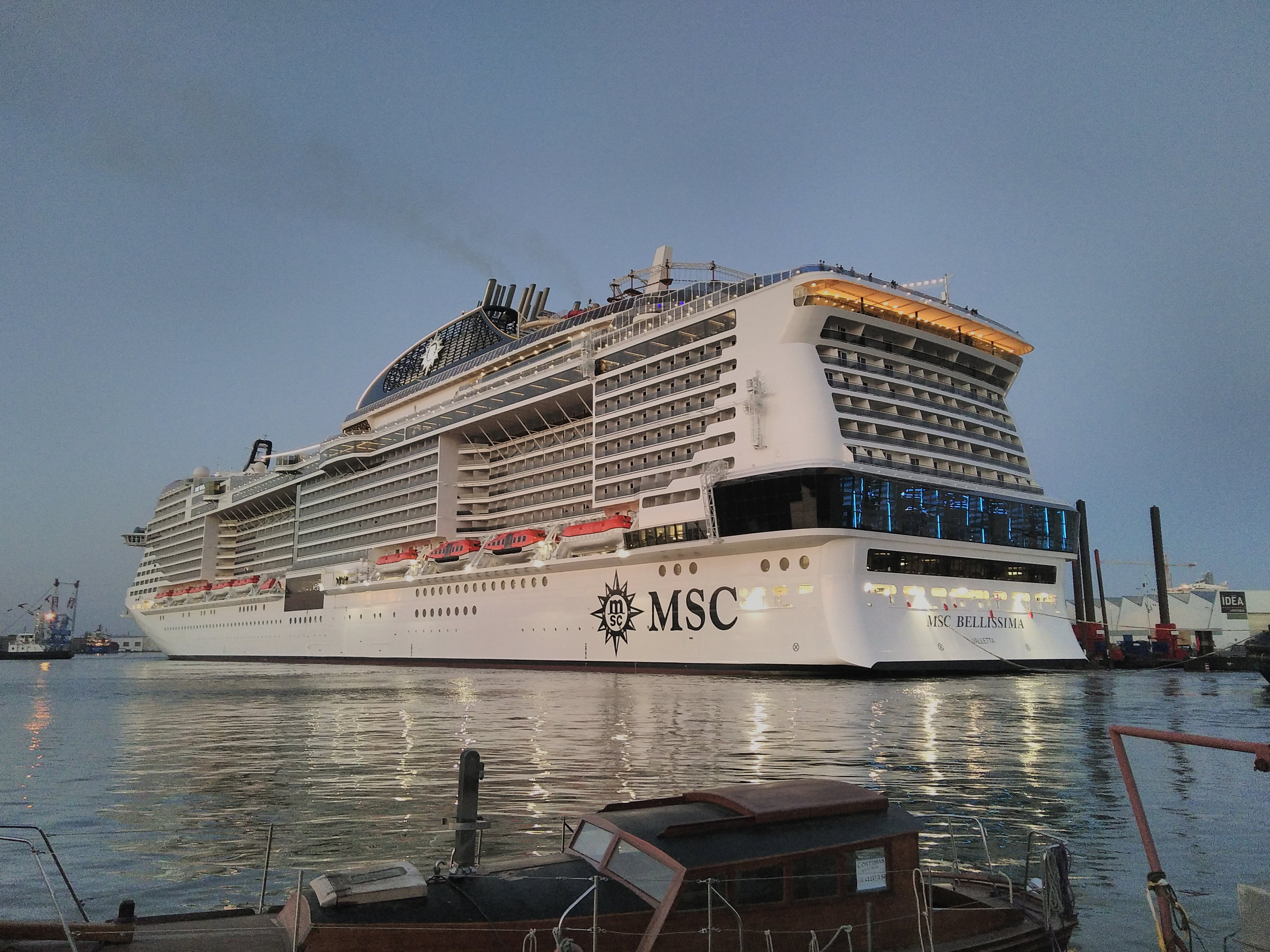
MSC Bellissima in Saint-Nazaire the day before its departure on 26 February 2019

Her delivery ceremony took place on 27 February 2019. MSC Bellissima was officially named on 2 March 2019, at Southampton, by the actress Sophia Loren. The original ceremony in a marquee on the quayside had to be abandoned due to high winds, so a substitute ceremony was quickly organised and Loren pressed a button on the ship's bridge to smash the bottle of champagne on the ship's bow.

MSC Cruises collaborated with Harman International to bring "ZOE," the first virtual assistant to be featured on any cruise ship, to MSC Bellissima and future MSC Cruises ships. In September 2019, as a part of MSC Cruises' longstanding relationship with Swarovski, MSC Bellissima featured a suite fully embellished with 700,000 crystals.

On 13 February 2020, MSC Bellissima was featured on Ultimate Mega Cruise Ship on Channel 5 in the United Kingdom.

== Route ==
MSC Bellissima departed for her maiden voyage on 4 March 2019, and made an inaugural call in Spain on 12 March 2019. She spent her maiden season in the Mediterranean, before re-positioning to the Persian Gulf in November 2019, cruising from Dubai for the winter season, and made a maiden call at Doha, Qatar in December 2019. She then redeployed to serve MSC's China program in spring 2020. Later in 2020, the ship relocated to Asia, serving itineraries such as China.

== Incidents ==
=== Coronavirus pandemic ===
On 21 March 2020, officials from the Indian state of Telangana reported that a 33-year-old crew member of MSC Bellissima had tested positive for SARS-CoV-2. The crew member was also deported to Dubai, and was stable at the time of the deport.

On 24 March 2020, it was reported that three Azoreans who were former passengers of MSC Bellissima during its cruise to Dubai from 7 March 2020 to 14 March 2020 had tested positive. (Note: Two cases were from São Miguel Island, a 31-year-old man and a 22-year-old woman, while one case from São Jorge Island had been diagnosed previously, but had been in contact with a newly-diagnosed case from Terceira Island.)

On 2 April 2020, a 22-year-old crew member of MSC Bellissima, who had quarantined himself at home in Trappeto, Sicily after returning from Dubai, announced that he had tested positive that day. On 10 April 2020, a dancer from Klagenfurt, Austria, who performed in Cirque du Soleil shows aboard MSC Bellissima, tested positive for the virus while she was still on board the ship. The crew member was tested a day before she was scheduled to leave for home, and the result came as a surprise as she had been asymptomatic. As of 4 May 2020, she has been stuck aboard MSC Bellissima for 50 days.

=== Engine failure ===
On December 4 2024, MSC Bellissima set sailed from Keelung, Taiwan, and bounded for Okinawa, Japan. After the stopovers at Ishigaki Island and Miyako Island, MSC Bellissima had finally reached Naha on December 6. The ship had a critical engine failure and was immobilized at Naha harbour, which resulted in thousands of passengers being stranded at Naha. The company announced there woud be a full refund to all passengers, and arranged return flights from Naha to Taiwan.
