= Rombak Bridge =

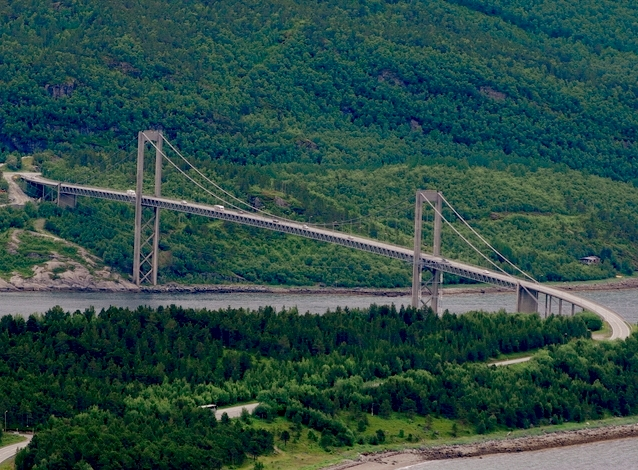
- View of the bridge
- Coordinates: 68°26′29″N 17°42′19″E
- Crosses: Rombaken fjord
- Locale: Narvik Municipality, Norway

Characteristics
- Design: Suspension bridge
- Total length: 765 metres (2,510 ft)
- Longest span: 325 metres (1,066 ft)
- Load limit: 90 tonnes (99 short tons)
- Clearance below: 41 metres (135 ft)

History
- Opened: 1964

Statistics
- Toll: No (but further north on E10)

The Rombak Bridge (Norwegian: Rombaksbrua) is a suspension bridge in Narvik Municipality in Nordland county, Norway. The bridge crosses the Rombaken fjord near the town of Narvik. The 765-metre-long (2,510 ft) bridge was opened in 1964. The main span is 325 metres (1,066 ft), and the maximum clearance to the sea is 41 metres (135 ft).

The bridge was originally part of the European route E6 highway, but the road was in December 2018 re-routed further west over the new Hålogaland Bridge, a long suspension bridge. The reason for that was to shorten the distance by 18 kilometres (11 mi); the Rombak Bridge has a weight limit of 90 metric tons (89 long tons; 99 short tons), which is not sufficient for a modern highway, and that there is a danger of avalanches on the road near the bridge. The Rombak Bridge is now on a county road.

The bridge is not tolled, and when driving from Narvik to Kiruna in Sweden over the Rombak Bridge, there is no toll. The Hålogaland Bridge has a toll station, and there is one more along E10 on the north side of the fjord.

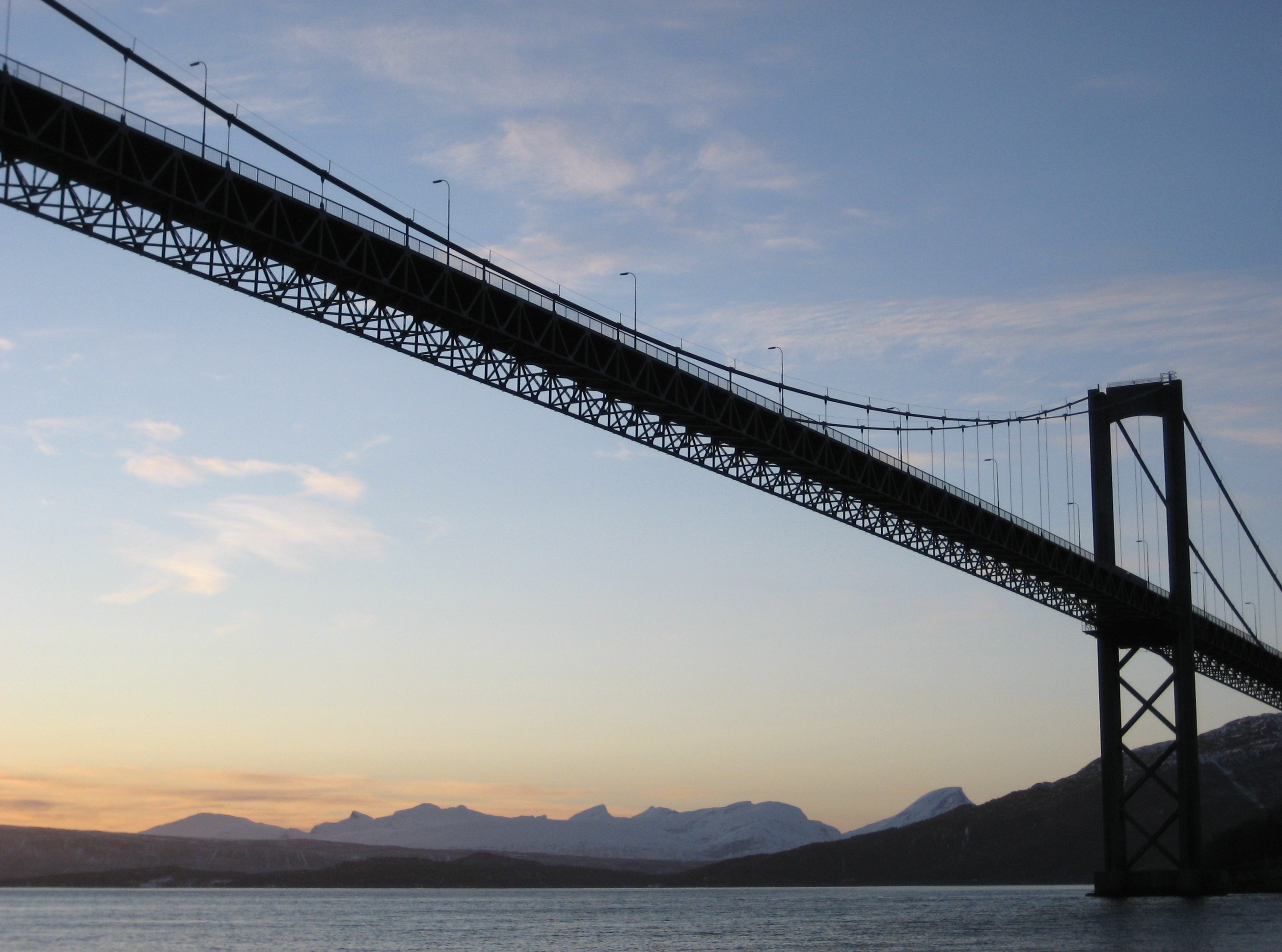
Rombaksbrua in 2008
