= Rombaken =

Fjord in Nordland, Norway

Rombaken (Norwegian); Ruoppat (Northern Sami)
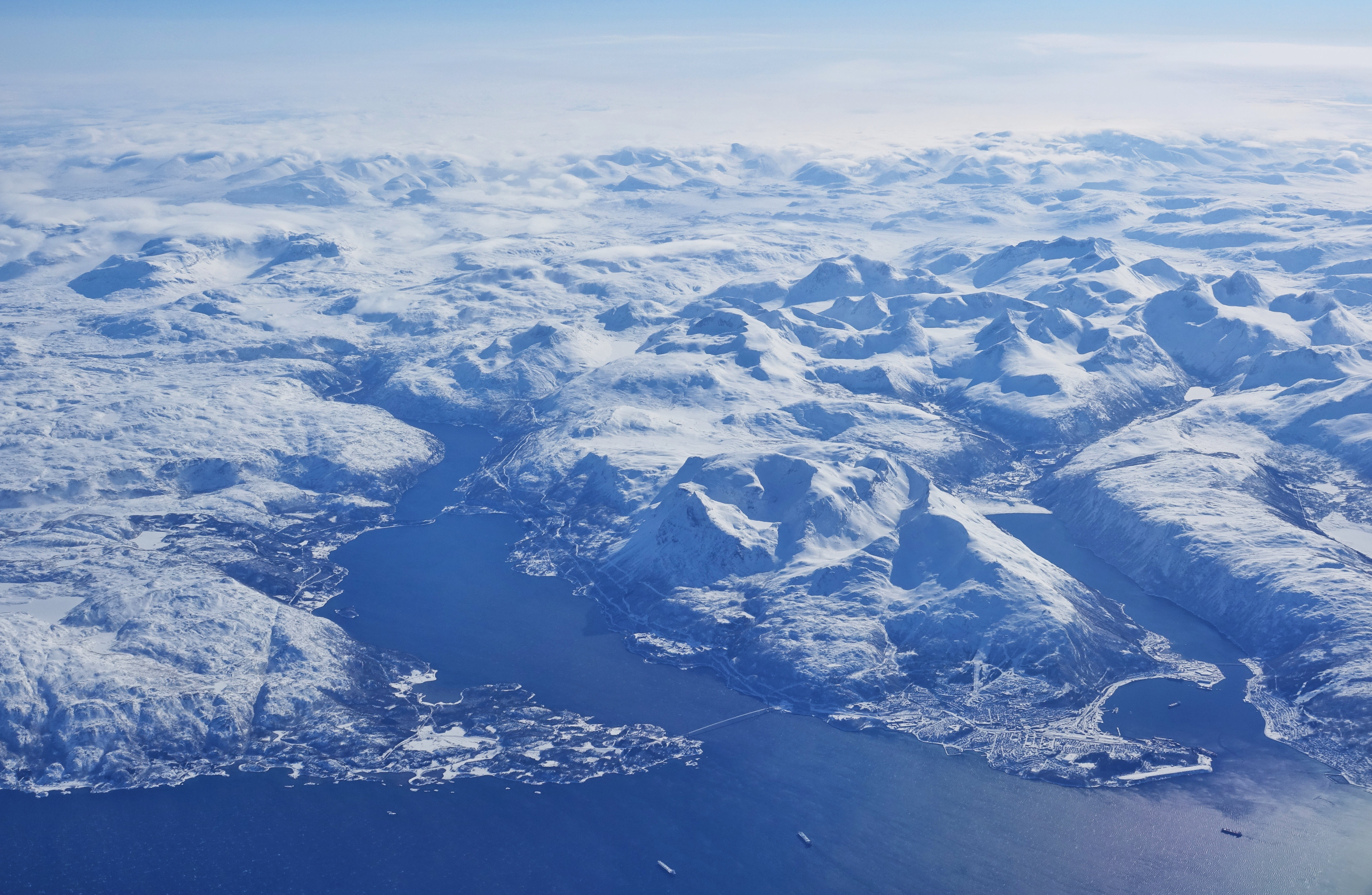
- Overview of Rombaken and Narvik to the right/south
- Interactive map of the fjord
- Location: Nordland county, Norway
- Coordinates: 68.4595°N 17.5888°E
- Type: Fjord
- Basin countries: Norway
- Max. length: 20 kilometres (12 mi)
- Max. depth: 344 metres (1,129 ft)
- Settlements: Narvik

Rombaken (Norwegian) or Ruoppat (Northern Sami) (or unofficially: Rombaksfjord) is a fjord that branches off of the main Ofotfjorden in Narvik Municipality in Nordland county, Norway. The fjord is about 20 kilometres (12 mi) long and is surrounded by steep mountains, and the town of Narvik lies on the south shore of the mouth of the fjord. The European route E06 and European route E10 highways run along the northern shores of the fjord. The fjord has two bridge crossings: the Hålogaland Bridge, completed in 2018, crosses at the mouth of the Rombaken fjord and the Rombak Bridge, which crosses at a narrow point about mid-way down the fjord.

== History ==
Along the inner part of the fjord, there used to be a city—Rombaksbotn—with 700 inhabitants. It had its time of greatness during the construction of the Ofotbanen between 1898 and 1903.

=== World War II ===
Rombaken was the site of several naval battles during the Battle of Narvik in World War II. Ten German destroyers, half the destroyer force of the Kriegsmarine, and one U-boat were sunk during the battle. It is also where ORP Grom, one of the two most heavily armed and fastest destroyers of World War II, was sunk by a Heinkel He 11 from Luftwaffe's Kampfgeschwader 100.

=== After World War II ===
Parts of the bow of the German destroyer Georg Thiele remain visible above the water in Rombaksbotn to this day. The wrecks at Narvik remain popular diving spots, although some are off-limits because they still contain unexploded ordnance. The destroyers Anton Schmitt, Diether von Roeder and Wilhelm Heidkamp rest in 12 m (39 ft) of water there and were opened for diving. Several other wrecks are accessible, too, but most have been preserved as historic sites, and it is forbidden to dive into them.

== Media gallery ==
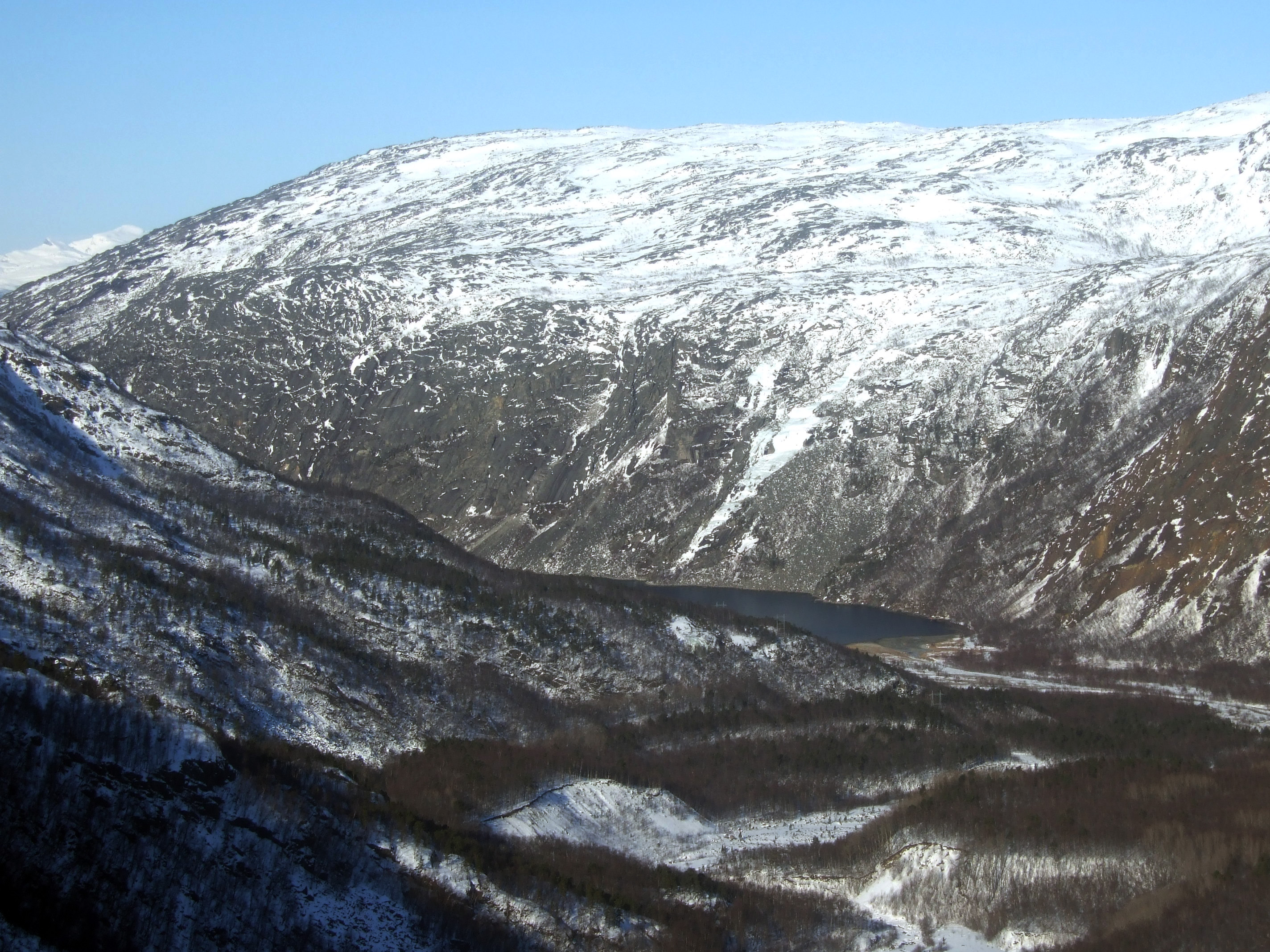
Part of Rombaken

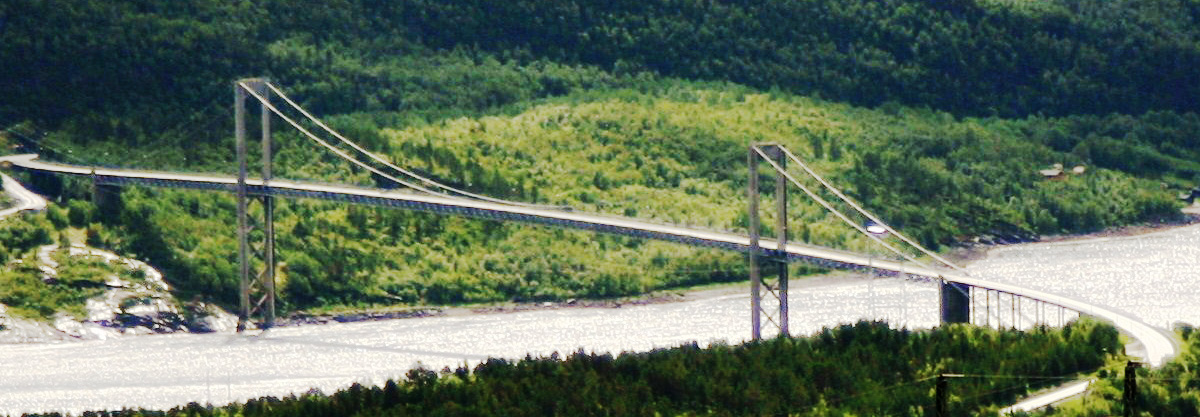
The Rombak Bridge is a suspension bridge over the fjord.

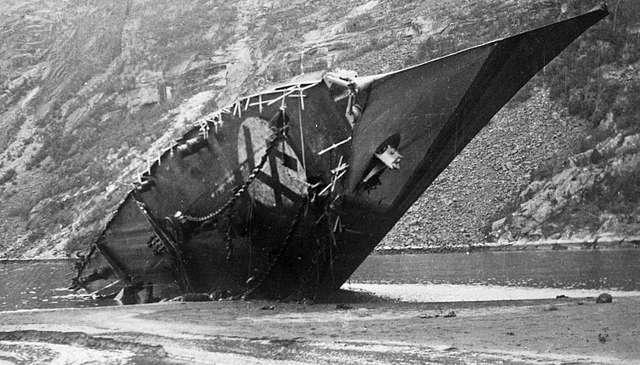
The German destroyer Z11 Bernd von Arnim, beached and scuttled at Rombaken during the Second Naval Battle of Narvik during World War II

== See also ==
- Nygårds Hydroelectric Power Station
