= List of ships built at Meyer Werft =

This list of ships built at Meyer Werft contains a selection of ships which were built new by the Meyer Werft GmbH of Papenburg, Germany.

All data is as of delivery from Meyer Werft to the client.

| Yard number | Completion | IMO | Ship name | Type | Gross tonnage | Passenger capacity | Loading capacity | Client country | Client | Image |
|---|---|---|---|---|---|---|---|---|---|---|
| 4 | 1875 | | Triton | Paddlesteamer | GRT: 113 | 210 | | German Empire | Norddeutscher Lloyd | |
| 32 | 1886 | | Augusta | Paddlesteamer | GRT: 119 | 200 | | German Empire | D. Höcker, Leer | |
| 47 | 1888 | | Norddeich | Paddlesteamer | GRT: 192 | 450 | | German Empire | Dampfschiff-Rhederei „Norden“ | |
| 85 | 1892 | | Norderney | Paddlesteamer | GRT: 276 | 450 | | German Empire | Dampfschiff-Rhederei „Norden“ | |
| 100 | 1894 | | Reserve-Jade | Lightvessel | GRT: 300 | | | German Empire | Reichsmarineamt | |
| 129 | 1898 | | Uganda | Paddlesteamer | | | | German Empire | Auswärtiges Amt | |
| 157 | 1902 | | Juist | Paddlesteamer | GRT: 169 | 350 | | German Empire | Vereinigte Dampfschiffrhederei Norden und Norderney | |
| 162 | 1902 | 8976918 | Außenjade | Lightvessel | m^{3}: 407 | | | German Empire | Reichsmarineamt | |
| —N/a | 1902 | | Herzogin Elisabeth | State yacht | | | | German Empire | Auswärtiges Amt | |
| 203 | 1906 | | Bussard | Buoy tender | GRT: 246 | | | German Empire | Königliche Wasserbau-Inspektion Flensburg | |
| —N/a | 1906 | | SMS Fuchs | Tender | t: 638 | | | German Empire | Kaiserliche Marine | |
| —N/a | 1906 | | Dr. Ziegner-Gnüchtel | Seebäderschiff | GRT: 170 | 240 | | German Empire | Stadt Wilhelmshaven | |
| 240 | 1909 | | Prinz Heinrich | Passenger ship | GRT: 212 | 350 | | German Empire | Borkumer Kleinbahn | |
| 254 | 1911 | | Borkumriff | Lightvessel | m^{3}: 650 | | | German Empire | Ministerium für öffentliche Arbeiten | |
| 261 | 1912 | | Westerems | Lightvessel (unmanned) | | | | German Empire | Ministerium für öffentliche Arbeiten | |
| 275 | 1912 | | Jasmund | Lightvessel | GRT: 186 | | | German Empire | Reichsmarineamt | |
| 280 | 1912 | 5008332 | Albatros | Passenger ship | GRT: 214 | 405 | | German Empire | Vereinigte Flensburg-Ekensunder und Sonderburger Dampfschiffs-Gesellschaft | |
| 300 | 1915 | | Goetzen | LOPAX ship | | | | German Empire | Ostafrikanische Eisenbahn-Gesellschaft | |
| 317 | 1915 | | Amrumbank | Lightvessel | GRT: 404 | | | German Empire | Ministerium für öffentliche Arbeiten | |
| 341 | 1922 | | Altair | Fishing vessel | GRT: 173 | | | Germany | Heringsfischerei Dollart AG | |
| 371 | 1927 | | Langeoog IV | Passenger ship | GRT: 75 | 125 | | Germany | Schiffahrt der Inselgemeinde Langeoog | |
| 377 | 1928 | | Frisia I | Seebäderschiff | GRT: 504 | 830 | | Germany | Reederei Norden-Frisia | |
| 396 | 1934 | 8137574 | Ems | Passenger ship | 142 | | | Nazi Germany | Reichsverkehrsministerium | |
| 401 | 1935 | | Baltrum II | Passenger ship | 118 | 250 | | Germany | Reederei Baltrum-Linie | |
| 403 | 1935 | | Frisia X | Seebäderschiff | GRT: 322 | 460 | | Germany | Reederei Norden-Frisia | |
| 436 | 1948 | 8137548 | Bürgermeister O'Swald | Lightvessel | 641 | | 227 DWT | Nazi Germany | Reichsverkehrsministerium | |
| 434 | 1949 | | Frisia XV | Seebäderschiff | GRT: 209 | 365 | | Germany | Reederei Norden-Frisia | |
| 452 | 1952 | | Petereins | Coastal trading vessel | GRT: 670 | | 800 DWT | Germany | Karl Peters, Papenburg | |
| 453 | 1952 | | Peterzwei | Coastal trading vessel | GRT: 629 | | 845 DWT | Germany | Karl Peters, Papenburg | |
| 454 | 1953 | | Frisia IV | Seebäderschiff | GRT: 413 | 756 | | Germany | Reederei Norden-Frisia | |
| 457 | 1951 | 5388407 | Westfalen | Seebäderschiff | GRT: 279 | 410 | | Germany | AG Ems | |
| 459 | 1952 | | Blockland | Coastal trading vessel | GRT: 832 | | 1,350 DWT | Germany | Seereederei „Weserland“, Bremen | |
| 460 | 1953 | | Elisabeth Hendrik Fisser | Coastal trading vessel | GRT: 1,342 | | 1,950 DWT | Germany | Hendrik Fisser, Emden | |
| 461 | 1953 | 5401235 | Ferdinandstor | Coastal trading vessel | GRT: 1,365 | | 1,400 DWT | Germany | Fisser & van Doornum, Hamburg | |
| 463 | 1953 | | Dammtor | Coastal trading vessel | GRT: 1,338 | | 1,990 DWT | Germany | Fisser & van Doornum, Hamburg | |
| | 1954 | 5119595 | Francisca Sartori | Cargo ship | GRT: 2,588 | | 3,951 DWT | Germany | Hamburg-Chicago-Linie | |
| 466 | 1954 | | Heinrich Lorenz | Coastal trading vessel | GRT: 1,123 | | 1,960 DWT | Germany | Gem. Kohlenhandels GmbH, Hamburg | |
| 468 | 1955 | 5229833 | Mauritius | LOPAX ship | GRT: 2,092 | | 2,473 DWT | Mauritius | Colonial Steamship Co. | |
| 482 | 1957 | | Frisia II | Seebäderschiff | GRT: 470 | 863 | | Germany | Reederei Norden-Frisia | |
| 489 | 1958 | 8136049 | Baltrum III | Seebäderschiff | GRT: 260 | 472 | | Germany | Reederei Baltrum-Linie | |
| 490 | 1957 | | Möwensteert | Tugboat | GRT: 104 | | | Germany | Wasser- und Schifffahrtsamt Emden | |
| 492 | 1958 | 5090775 | Ditmar Koel | Pilot boat | 767 | | 137 DWT | Germany | Bundesministeriums für Verkehr | |
| 495 | 1960 | 5266489 | Ostfriesland | Seebäderschiff | GRT: 774 | 647 | | Germany | AG Ems | |
| 496 | 1959 | 5134131 | Gotthilf Hagen | Pilot boat | 762 | | 136 DWT | Germany | Bundesministeriums für Verkehr | |
| 500 | 1960 | 5121768 | Frisia III | Seebäderschiff | GRT: 862 | 862 | | Germany | Reederei Norden-Frisia | |
| 504 | 1961 | 5171543 | Brosund | Coastal trading vessel | GRT: 1,543 | | 2,497 DWT | Denmark | Hafnia A/S, Frederikshavn | |
| 514 | 1962 | 8842519 | Frisia VIII | Ferry | GRT: 319 | 500 | 30 cars | Germany | Reederei Norden-Frisia | |
| 516 | 1963 | 5415119 | Bornholmerpilen | Car carrier | GRT: 1,999 | 900 | 74 cars | Denmark | Dampskipsselskabet Bornholm | |
| 517 | 1963 | 5405889 | Kapitän König | Pilot boat | 762 | | 137 DWT | Germany | Bundesministeriums für Verkehr | |
| 518 | 1963 | 5420724 | Kapitän Bleeker | Pilot boat | 762 | | 137 DWT | Germany | Bundesministeriums für Verkehr | |
| 519 | 1964 | 5427784 | Kommodore Ruser | Pilot boat | 759 | | 137 DWT | Germany | Bundesministeriums für Verkehr | |
| 522 | 1964 | 6410776 | Malmø | Car carrier | GRT: 495 | 495 | | Denmark | Interessentskabet | |
| 523 | 1964 | 6412138 | Münsterland | Seebäderschiff | GRT: 735 | 950 | | Germany | AG Ems | |
| 529 | 1965 | 8827181 | Frisia V | Ferry | GRT: 627 | 800 | 250 cars | Germany | Reederei Norden-Frisia | |
| 530 | 1965 | 6504773 | Langeland | Car carrier | GRT: 907 | 400 | 60 cars | Denmark | Interessentskabet | |
| 531 | 1966 | 6617025 | Salome | Car carrier | GRT: 1,961 | | | Germany | Wallenius, Bremen | |
| 532 | 1968 | 6807357 | Betula | Car carrier | GRT: 2,292 | 900 | 105 cars | Sweden | Rederi AB Svea | |
| 533 | 1965 | 6511001 | Hammershus | Car carrier | GRT: 2,938 | 1,000 | 78 cars | Denmark | Dampskipsselskabet Bornholm | |
| 534 | 1965 | 6517005 | Jop | Coastal trading vessel | GRT: 499 | | 1,312 DWT | Germany | Bernhard Schöning, Haren (Ems) | |
| 536 | 1965 | 6523042 | Santa Maria | Coastal trading vessel | GRT: 499 | | 1,326 DWT | Germany | Herman & Engelbert Lohmann, Haren (Ems) | |
| 538 | 1966 | 6617752 | Undine | Car carrier | GRT: 1,963 | | | Germany | Wallenius, Bremen | |
| 541 | 1968 | 8827179 | Frisia VI | Ferry | GRT: 547 | 840 | | Germany | Reederei Norden-Frisia | |
| 545 | 1969 | 6922341 | Vikingfjord | Car carrier | GRT: 3,777 | 1,000 | 156 cars | Germany | Nordlandfähre (partner shipping company) | |
| 546 | 1966 | 6620175 | Meteor | Coastal trading vessel | GRT: 1,359 | | 2,274 DWT | Germany | Johann Kahrs, Hamburg | |
| 547 | 1966 | 6704098 | Seeadler | Coastal trading vessel | GRT: 793 | | 1,500 DWT | Germany | Otto Eckhardt, Elsfleth | |
| 550 | 1968 | | Kap Roland | Gas carrier | GRT: 1,599 | | 1,735 DWT | Germany | Kap Roland (partner shipping company) | |
| 554 | 1971 | 7116119 | Irene | Gas carrier | GRT: 4,266 | | 5,809 DWT | Germany | Transmarin | |
| 555 | 1969 | 6910934 | Servus | Car carrier | GRT: 2,232 | | 840 lane meters | Sweden | Rederi AB Svea | |
| 557 | 1970 | 7027734 | Peter Wehr | Coastal trading vessel | GRT: 1,558 | | 3,145 DWT | Germany | Reederei Oskar Wehr | |
| 559 | 1970 | | Weser Agent | Coastal trading vessel | GRT: 1,625 | | 2,893 DWT | Germany | Weser-Schiffahrtsagentur, Rendsburg | |
| 560 | 1970 | 7006314 | Apollo | Car carrier | GRT: 4, 238 | 1,200 | 260 cars | Sweden | Rederi AB Slite | |
| 561 | 1970 | 7018604 | Frisia I | Ferry | GRT: 840 | 800 | 42 cars | Germany | Reederei Norden-Frisia | |
| 562 | 1970 | 7018599 | Viking 1 | Car carrier | GRT: 4,239 | 1,200 | 260 cars | Finland | Rederi Ab Sally | |
| 563 | 1971 | 7051058 | Regula | Car carrier | GRT: 2,319 | 900 | 75 cars | Sweden | Rederi AB Svea | |
| 564 | 1971 | 7109609 | Svea Scarlett | Car carrier | GRT: 2,957 | 800 | 95 cars | Sweden | Rederi AB Svea | |
| 565 | 1971 | 7128887 | Viking 3 | Car carrier | GRT: 4,299 | 1,200 | 265 cars | Finland | Rederi Ab Sally | |
| 566 | 1972 | 7224370 | Diana | Car carrier | GRT: 4,152 | 1,200 | 265 cars | Sweden | Rederi AB Slite | |
| 568 | 1973 | 7324833 | Coromuel | Car carrier | GRT: 7,235 | 696 | 260 cars 23 trucks | Mexico | Caminos y Puentes Federales | |
| 569 | 1973 | 7236127 | Ursula | Car carrier | GRT: 2,369 | 900 | 75 cars | Sweden | Rederi AB Svea | |
| 570 | 1973 | 7310258 | Viking 4 | Car carrier | GRT: 4,477 | 1,200 | 265 cars | Finland | Rederi Ab Sally | |
| 571 | 1974 | 7349596 | Puerto Vallarta | Car carrier | GRT: 7,005 | 696 | 260 cars 23 trucks | Mexico | Caminos y Puentes Federales | |
| 573 | 1974 | 7349601 | Viking 5 | Car carrier | GRT: 8,257 | 1,200 | 300 cars | Finland | Rederi Ab Sally | |
| 574 | 1974 | 7361049 | Stella Scarlett | Car carrier | GRT: 4,174 | 934 | 145 cars | Sweden | Rederi AB Svea | |
| 575 | 1975 | 7393171 | Azteca | Car carrier | GRT: 6,823 | 696 | 260 cars 23 trucks | Mexico | Caminos y Puentes Federales | |
| 582 | 1976 | 7514361 | Coral Isis | Gas carrier | GRT: 4,326 | | 6,080 DWT | Cuba | Coral Shipping | |
| 583 | 1977 | 7601047 | Epsilongas | Gas carrier | GRT: 4,460 | | 5.962 DWT | Germany | Sloman Neptun, Bremen | |
| 584 | 1982 | 8111843 | Kurt Illies | Gas carrier | 5,804 | | 6.517 m^{3} | Germany | Reederei Bernhard Schulte, Hamburg | |
| 586 | 1978 | | Benghazi | Gas carrier | 4,612 | | 5.540 m^{3} | Algeria | C.A.L.T.R.A.M. | |
| 587 | 1978 | 7724552 | Ems | Car carrier | GRT: 5,401 | | 1,848 lane meters | Germany | MS „Ems“ Schiffahrtsgesellschaft | |
| 588 | 1979 | 7909621 | Nestor | Car carrier | GRT: 5,121 | | 2,080 lane meters | Germany | MS „Nestor“ Schiffahrtsgesellschaft | |
| 589 | 1978 | 7723974 | Frisia II | Ferry | GRT: 827 | 800 | 42 cars | Germany | Reederei Norden-Frisia | |
| 590 | 1980 | 7921033 | Viking Sally | ROPAX-ship | 15,566 | 2,000 | | Finland | Viking Line | |
| 591 | 1980 | 7928641 | Hermann Schulte | Gas carrier | GRT: 4,884 | | 6,145 DWT | Germany | Reederei Bernhard Schulte, Hamburg | |
| 592 | 1979 | 7816874 | Diana II | Car carrier | GRT: 11,671 | 1,900 | 555 cars | Sweden | Rederi AB Slite | |
| 594 | 1978 | 7816147 | Germann | Coastal trading vessel | 1,589 | | 1,670 DWT | Germany | Reederei Bernhard Schulte, Hamburg | |
| 595 | 1981 | 8002664 | Dorothea Schulte | Gas carrier | GRT: 4,884 | | 6,118 DWT | Germany | Reederei Bernhard Schulte, Hamburg | |
| 596 | 1980 | 7920390 | Ambassador | Car carrier | GRT: 13,413 | | 2,710 lane meters | United States | Coordinated Caribbean Transport | |
| 597 | 1981 | 8026048 | Diplomat | Car carrier | GRT: 13,412 | | 2,710 lane meters | United States | Coordinated Caribbean Transport | |
| 600 | 1982 | 8108731 | Tycho Brahe | Gas carrier | 12,183 | | 15,105 m^{3} (19,757 cu yd) | Germany | Friedrich A. Detjen, Hamburg | |
| 601 | 1982 | 8111855 | Zetagas | Gas carrier | 5,643 | | 6,566 m^{3} (8,588 cu yd) | Germany | Sloman Neptun Schifffahrts AG | |
| 602 | 1985 | 8414178 | Donau | Gas carrier | 23,508 | | 30,207 m^{3} (39,509 cu yd) | Germany | Friedrich A. Detjen, Hamburg | |
| 604 | 1987 | 8506426 | Grajaú | Gas carrier | 8,075 | | 8,140 m^{3} (10,650 cu yd) | Brazil | Petrobras | |
| 605 | 1987 | 8506438 | Gurupá | Gas carrier | 8,075 | | 8,140 m^{3} (10,650 cu yd) | Brazil | Petrobras | |
| 606 | 1984 | 8303240 | Sultan Mahmud Badaruddin II | Gas carrier | 6,932 | | 8,700 m^{3} (11,400 cu yd) | Indonesia | P.T. Pupuk Sriwidjaja | |
| 607 | 1987 | 8516897 | Gurupi | Gas carrier | 8,075 | | 8,140 m^{3} (10,650 cu yd) | Brazil | Petrobras | |
| 608 | 1983 | 8209676 | Kerinci | Passenger ship | 14,501 | 1,596 | | Indonesia | Pelayaran Nasional Indonesia | |
| 609 | 1984 | 8209688 | Kambuna | Passenger ship | 14,501 | | | Indonesia | Pelayaran Nasional Indonesia | |
| 610 | 1986 | 8407735 | Homeric | Cruise ship | 42,092 | 1,132 scrapped | | Panama | Home Lines | |
| 611 | 1984 | 8303252 | Rinjani | Passenger ship | 14,501 | | | Indonesia | Pelayaran Nasional Indonesia | |
| 612 | 1985 | 8303264 | Umsini | Passenger ship | 14,501 | 1,737 | | Indonesia | Pelayaran Nasional Indonesia | |
| 614 | 1986 | 8502341 | Kelimutu | Passenger ship | 6,022 | 920 | | Indonesia | Pelayaran Nasional Indonesia | |
| 615 | 1986 | 8502353 | Lawit | Passenger ship | 6,022 | 920 | | Indonesia | Pelayaran Nasional Indonesia | |
| 616 | 1988 | 8506294 | Crown Odyssey | Cruise ship | 34,320 | 1,200 | | Bahamas | Royal Cruise Line | |
| 617 | 1988 | 8700292 | Tidar | Passenger ship | 14,501 | 1,904 | | Indonesia | Pelayaran Nasional Indonesia | |
| 619 | 1990 | 8807088 | Horizon | Cruise ship | 46,811 | 1,750 | | United States | Celebrity Cruises | |
| 620 | 1992 | 8918136 | Zenith | Cruise ship | 47,255 | 1,781 | | United States | Celebrity Cruises | |
| 621 | 1989 | 8813063 | Sigulda | Gas carrier | 11,822 | | 15,096 m^{3} (19,745 cu yd) | Soviet Union | Sovcomflot | |
| 622 | 1990 | 8813075 | Sloka | Gas carrier | 11,822 | | 15,096 m^{3} (19,745 cu yd) | Soviet Union | Sovcomflot | |
| 623 | 1990 | 8813087 | Skriveri | Gas carrier | 11,822 | | 15,096 m^{3} (19,745 cu yd) | Soviet Union | Sovcomflot | |
| 624 | 1991 | 8813099 | Skulte | Gas carrier | 11,822 | | 15,096 m^{3} (19,745 cu yd) | Soviet Union | Sovcomflot | |
| 625 | 1991 | 8813104 | Saulkrasti | Gas carrier | 11,822 | | 15,096 m^{3} (19,745 cu yd) | Soviet Union | Sovcomflot | |
| 626 | 1991 | 8813116 | Salacgriva | Gas carrier | 11,822 | | 15,096 m^{3} (19,745 cu yd) | Soviet Union | Sovcomflot | |
| 627 | 1993 | 8919805 | Silja Europa | ROPAX-ferry | 59,914 | 3,123 | 400 cars 50 trucks | Finland | Silja Line | |
| 628 | 1990 | 8915639 | Tatamailau | Passenger ship | 6,041 | 969 | | Indonesia | Pelayaran Nasional Indonesia | |
| 629 | 1991 | 8915641 | Sirimau | Passenger ship | 6,022 | 969 | | Indonesia | Pelayaran Nasional Indonesia | |
| 630 | 1991 | 8915653 | Awu | Passenger ship | 6,041 | 969 | | Indonesia | Pelayaran Nasional Indonesia | |
| 631 | 1993 | 9032135 | Ciremai | Passenger ship | 14,581 | 1,973 | | Indonesia | Pelayaran Nasional Indonesia | |
| 632 | 1993 | 9032147 | Dobonsolo | Passenger ship | 14,581 | 1,974 | | Indonesia | Pelayaran Nasional Indonesia | |
| 633 | 1994 | 9032159 | Leuser | Passenger ship | 6,041 | 970 | | Indonesia | Pelayaran Nasional Indonesia | |
| 634 | 1994 | 9032161 | Binaiya | Passenger ship | 6,022 | 970 | | Indonesia | Pelayaran Nasional Indonesia | |
| 635 | 1994 | 9032173 | Bukit Raya | Passenger ship | 6,022 | 970 | | Indonesia | Pelayaran Nasional Indonesia | |
| 636 | 1995 | 9050137 | Oriana | Cruise ship | 69,153 | 1,928 | | United Kingdom | P&O Cruises | |
| 637 | 1995 | 9072446 | Century | Cruise ship | 70,606 | 1,778 | | United States | Celebrity Cruises | |
| 638 | 1996 | 9106297 | Galaxy | Cruise ship | 77,700 | 2,217 | | United States | Celebrity Cruises | |
| 639 | 1997 | 9106297 | Mercury | Cruise ship | 77,700 | 2,217 | | United States | Celebrity Cruises | |
| 640 | 2000 | 9169524 | Aurora | Cruise ship | 76,152 | 1,878 | | United Kingdom | P&O Cruises | |
| 641 | 1995 | 9102760 | Tilongkabila | Passenger ship | 6,022 | 970 | | Indonesia | Pelayaran Nasional Indonesia | |
| 642 | 1996 | 9124536 | Bukit Siguntang | Passenger ship | 14,643 | 2,003 | | Indonesia | Pelayaran Nasional Indonesia | |
| 643 | 1997 | 9124548 | Lambelu | Passenger ship | 14,649 | 2,003 | | Indonesia | Pelayaran Nasional Indonesia | |
| 644 | 1997 | 9139672 | Sinabung | Passenger ship | 14,716 | 1,906 | | Indonesia | Pelayaran Nasional Indonesia | |
| 645 | 1998 | 9139684 | Kelud | Passenger ship | 14,716 | | | Indonesia | Pelayaran Nasional Indonesia | |
| 646 | 1999 | 9141065 | SuperStar Leo | Cruise ship | 75,338 | 2,500 | | Singapore | Star Cruises | |
| 647 | 1999 | 9141077 | SuperStar Virgo | Cruise ship | 75,338 | 2,500 | | Singapore | Star Cruises | |
| 648 | 2001 | 9195157 | Norwegian Star | Cruise ship | 91,740 | 2,348 | | China | Star Cruises (delivered to Norwegian Cruise Line) | |
| 649 | 2002 | 9195169 | Norwegian Dawn | Cruise ship | 92,250 | 2,244 | | China | Star Cruises (delivered to Norwegian Cruise Line) | |
| 650 | 2004 | 9268708 | Pont-Aven | ROPAX-ship | 40,859 | 2,415 | | France | Brittany Ferries | |
| 651 | 1998 | 9173056 | Clipper Viking | Gas carrier | 10,692 | | 13,779 DWT | Norway | Solvang ASA | |
| 652 | 1999 | 9173068 | Clipper Harald | Gas carrier | 10,692 | | 13,712 DWT | Norway | Solvang ASA | |
| 653 | 2007 | 9358670 | Clipper Hebe | Gas carrier | 13,893 | | 18,110 DWT | Norway | Solvang ASA | |
| 654 | 2007 | 9358682 | Clipper Helen | Gas carrier | 13,893 | | 18,110 DWT | Norway | Solvang ASA | |
| 655 | 2001 | 9195195 | Radiance of the Seas | Cruise ship | 90,090 | 2,501 | | United States | Royal Caribbean International | |
| 656 | 2002 | 9195200 | Brilliance of the Seas | Cruise ship | 90,090 | 2,501 | | United States | Royal Caribbean International | |
| 657 | 2003 | 9228344 | Serenade of the Seas | Cruise ship | 90,090 | 2,490 | | United States | Royal Caribbean International | |
| 658 | 2004 | 9228356 | Jewel of the Seas | Cruise ship | 90,090 | 2,490 | | United States | Royal Caribbean International | |
| 659 | 2007 | 9334856 | AIDAdiva | Cruise ship | 69,203 | 2,050 | | Germany | AIDA Cruises | |
| 660 | 2009 | 9334868 | AIDAluna | Cruise ship | 69,203 | 2,050 | | Germany | AIDA Cruises | |
| 661 | 2001 | 9226487 | Doro Londa | Passenger ship | 14,739 | 2,130 | | Indonesia | Pelayaran Nasional Indonesia | |
| 662 | 2002 | 9226499 | Nggapulu | Passenger ship | 14,739 | 2,130 | | Indonesia | Pelayaran Nasional Indonesia | |
| 663 | 2004 | 9281542 | Labobar | Passenger ship | 15,136 | 3,084 | 32 TEU | Indonesia | Pelayaran Nasional Indonesia | |
| 664 | 2008 | 9401324 | Gunung Dempo | Passenger ship | 14,017 | 1,583 | 98 TEU | Indonesia | Pelayaran Nasional Indonesia | |
| 665 | 2013 | 9617698 | Coral Energy | Gas carrier | | | 15,600 m^{3} (20,400 cu yd) | Netherlands | Anthony Veder, Rotterdam | |
| 666 | 2008 | 9362542 | AIDAbella | Cruise ship | 69,203 | 2,050 | | Germany | AIDA Cruises | |
| 667 | 2005 | 9304045 | Norwegian Jewel | Cruise ship | 93,502 | 2,376 | | United States | Norwegian Cruise Line | |
| 668 | 2006 | 9304057 | Pride of Hawaii | Cruise ship | 93,558 | 2,466 | | United States | Norwegian Cruise Line | |
| 669 | 2006 | 9342281 | Norwegian Pearl | Cruise ship | 93,530 | 2,394 | | United States | Norwegian Cruise Line | |
| 670 | 2007 | 9355733 | Norwegian Gem | Cruise ship | 93,530 | 2,834 | | United States | Norwegian Cruise Line | |
| 671 | 2005 | 9313199 | Eilbek | Container ship | 16,324 | | 1,600 TEU | Germany | Hansa Shipping, Hamburg | |
| 672 | 2005 | 9313204 | Reinbek | Container ship | 16,324 | | 1,600 TEU | Germany | Hansa Shipping, Hamburg | |
| 673 | 2005 | 9313216 | Flottbek | Container ship | 16,324 | | 1,600 TEU | Germany | Hansa Shipping, Hamburg | |
| 674 | 2005 | 9313228 | Barmbek | Container ship | 16,324 | | 1,600 TEU | Germany | Hansa Shipping, Hamburg | |
| 675 | 2008 | 9362530 | Celebrity Solstice | Cruise ship | 121,878 | 2,850 | | United States | Celebrity Cruises | |
| 676 | 2009 | 9372456 | Celebrity Equinox | Cruise ship | 121,878 | 2,850 | | United States | Celebrity Cruises | |
| 677 | 2010 | 9404314 | Celebrity Eclipse | Cruise ship | 121,878 | 2,850 | | United States | Celebrity Cruises | |
| 678 | 2013 | 9606912 | Norwegian Breakaway | Cruise ship | 146,600 | 3,969 | | United States | Norwegian Cruise Line | |
| 679 | 2011 | 9451094 | Celebrity Silhouette | Cruise ship | 122,210 | 2,886 | | United States | Celebrity Cruises | |
| 680 | 2010 | 9398888 | AIDAblu | Cruise ship | 71,304 | 2,192 | | Germany | AIDA Cruises | |
| 681 | 2008 | 9378151 | Clipper Hermes | Gas carrier | 13,893 | | 18,800 DWT | Norway | Solvang ASA | |
| 682 | 2008 | 9378163 | Clipper Hermod | Gas carrier | 13,893 | | 18,800 DWT | Norway | Solvang ASA | |
| 683 | 2009 | 9402562 | Gaschem Nordsee | Gas carrier | 13,878 | | 18,110 DWT | Germany | Harpain Reederei, Hamburg | |
| 684 | 2009 | 9402574 | Gaschem Pacific | Gas carrier | 13,750 | | 18,110 DWT | Germany | Harpain Reederei, Hamburg | |
| 685 | 2010 | 9402586 | Gaschem Adriatic | Gas carrier | 13,879 | | 18,110 DWT | Germany | Harpain Reederei, Hamburg | |
| 686 | 2010 | 9402598 | Gaschem Antarctic | Gas carrier | 13,879 | | 18,110 DWT | Germany | Harpain Reederei, Hamburg | |
| 687 | 2010 | 9434254 | Disney Dream | Cruise ship | 129,690 | 4,000 | | United States | Disney Cruise Line | |
| 688 | 2012 | 9445590 | Disney Fantasy | Cruise ship | 129,750 | 4,000 | | United States | Disney Cruise Line | |
| 689 | 2011 | 9490040 | AIDAsol | Cruise ship | 71,304 | 2,194 | | Germany | AIDA Cruises | |
| 690 | 2012 | 9490052 | AIDAmar | Cruise ship | 71,304 | 2,194 | | Germany | AIDA Cruises | |
| 691 | 2012 | 9506459 | Celebrity Reflection | Cruise ship | 126,600 | 3,046 | | United States | Celebrity Cruises | |
| 692 | 2014 | 9606924 | Norwegian Getaway | Cruise ship | 146,600 | 4,028 | | United States | Norwegian Cruise Line | |
| 695 | 2013 | 9601132 | AIDAstella | Cruise ship | 71,304 | 2,194 | | Germany | AIDA Cruises | |
| 697 | 2014 | 9549463 | Quantum of the Seas | Cruise ship | 167,800 | 4,180 | | United States | Royal Caribbean International | |
| 543 | 2014 | ENI 07001983 | Viking Lif | River cruise ship | 3,138 | 190 | | Switzerland | Viking River Cruises | |
| 701 | 2014 | ENI 07001985 | Viking Ingvi | River cruise ship | 3,138 | 190 | | Switzerland | Viking River Cruises | |
| 702 | 2014 | ENI 07001987 | Viking Eistla | River cruise ship | 3,138 | 190 | | Switzerland | Viking River Cruises | |
| 703 | 2014 | ENI 07001988 | Viking Bestla | River cruise ship | 3,138 | 190 | | Switzerland | Viking River Cruises | |
| 704 | 2014 | ENI 07001989 | Viking Alsvin | River cruise ship | 3,138 | 190 | | Switzerland | Viking River Cruises | |
| 530 | 2014 | 9633927 | Sonne | Research vessel | 8,554 | 40 | | Germany | Bundesministerium für Bildung und Forschung | |
| 698 | 2015 | 9656101 | Anthem of the Seas | Cruise ship | 168,666 | 4,100 | | United States | Royal Caribbean International | |
| 693 | 2015 | 9677076 | Norwegian Escape | Cruise ship | 164,600 | 4,200 | | United States | Norwegian Cruise Line | |
| 699 | 2016 | 9697753 | Ovation of the Seas | Cruise ship | 167,800 | 4,100 | | United States | Royal Caribbean International | |
| 711 | 2016 | 9733105 | Genting Dream | Cruise ship | 151,000 | 4,500 | | Hong Kong | Dream Cruises | |
| 694 | 2017 | | Norwegian Joy | Cruise ship | 168,800 | 4,200 | | United States | Norwegian Cruise Line | |
| 712 | 2017 | | World Dream | Cruise ship | 151,000 | 3,300 | | Hong Kong | Dream Cruises | |
| 707 | 2018 | | Norwegian Bliss | Cruise ship | 167,800 | 4,200 | | United States | Norwegian Cruise Line | |
| 696 | 2018 | | AIDAnova | Cruise ship | 183,900 | 6,600 | | Germany | AIDA Cruises | |
| 700 | 2019 | | Spectrum of the Seas | Cruise ship | 167,800 | 4,100 | | United States | Royal Caribbean International | |
| 708 | 2019 | | Norwegian Encore | Cruise ship | 169,145 | 3,998 | | United States | Norwegian Cruise Line | |
| 714 | 2019 | | Spirit of Discovery | Cruise ship | 55,900 | 999 | | United Kingdom | Saga Cruises | |
| 710 | 2020 | | Iona | Cruise ship | 183,900 | | | United Kingdom | P&O Cruises | |
| 715 | 2020 | | Spirit of Adventure | Cruise ship | 55,900 | 999 | | United Kingdom | Saga Cruises | |
| 713 | 2021 | | Odyssey Of The Seas | Cruise ship | 167,800 | 4,100 | | United States | Royal Caribbean International | |
| 709 | 2021 | | AIDAcosma | Cruise ship | 183,900 | 6,600 | | Germany | AIDA Cruises | |
| 705 | 2022 | 9834739 | Disney Wish | Cruise ship | 144,000 | 5,000 | | United States | Disney Cruise Line | |
| 716 | 2022 | 9849693 | Arvia | Cruise ship | 183,900 | 5,200 | | United Kingdom | P&O Cruises | |
| 719 | 2023 | 9886213 | Silver Nova | Cruise ship | 55,051 | 728 | | United States | Silversea Cruises | |
| 717 | 2023 | 9851737 | Carnival Jubilee | Cruise ship | 183,521 | 5,374 | | United States | Carnival Cruise Line | |
| 720 | 2024 | 9886225 | Silver Ray | Cruise Ship | 55.051 | 728 | | United States | Silversea Cruises | |
| 718 | 2024 | 9834753 | Disney Treasure | Cruise ship | 144,256 | 4,000 | | United States | Disney Cruise Line | |
| | 2024 | | Dolwin Delta | parts for a converter platform | | | | | | |
| 721 | 2025 | 9936355 | Asuka III | Cruise Ship | 51.950 | 744 | | Japan | Nippon Yusen Kaisha | |
| 706 | 2025 | | Disney Destiny | Cruise ship | 144,000 | 4,000 | | United States | Disney Cruise Line | |
Future Ships
| | 2026 | | Njord | Apartment ship | 84,800 | 1,000 | | Malta | Ocean Residences Development | |
| 724 | 2027 | | Carnival Festivale | Cruise ship | 180.000 | 5,374 | | United States | Carnival Cruise Line | |
| 723 | 2027 | | Disney Believe | Cruise ship | 144.000 | 4,000 | | United States | Disney Cruise Line | |
| 725 | 2028 | | Carnival Tropicale | Cruise ship | 180.000 | 5,374 | | United States | Carnival Cruise Line | |
| 722 | 2028 | | Disney Imagination | Cruise ship | 144,000 | 4,000 | | Japan | Disney Cruise Line / Oriental Land Company | |
| | 2029 | | N.N | Cruise ship | 100.000 | 3,000 | | United States | Disney Cruise Line | |
| | 2030 | | N.N | Cruise ship | 100.000 | 3,000 | | United States | Disney Cruise Line | |
| | 2031 | | N.N | Cruise ship | 100.000 | 3,000 | | United States | Disney Cruise Line | |
