= Carnival Corporation =

Anglo-American global cruise operating company

Carnival Corporation Ltd.

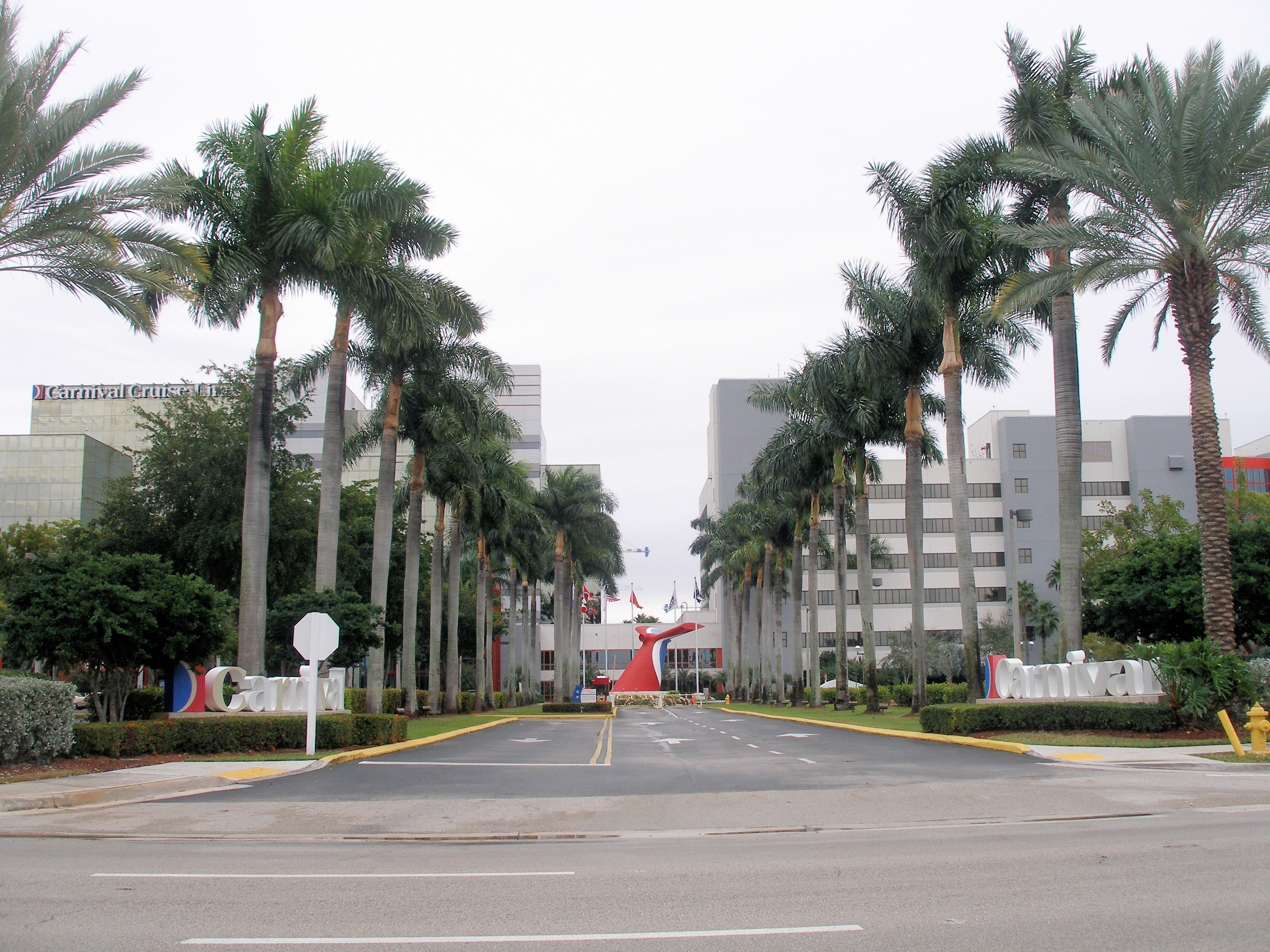
- Carnival Place, Doral, Florida
- Type: Public
- Traded as: NYSE: CCL; S&P 500 component
- ISIN: BMG2004J1036
- Industry: Hospitality, tourism
- Predecessors: Carnival Cruise Line (an existing subsidiary; Carnival Corporation); P&O Princess Cruises (Carnival plc)
- Incorporated: Bermuda
- Founded: 1972; 54 years ago (as Carnival Cruise Line, now a subsidiary); 1993; 33 years ago (as Carnival Corporation); 2003; 23 years ago (as Carnival Corporation & plc); May 7, 2026; 6 months ago (as Carnival Corporation Ltd.)
- Founder: Ted Arison (for the Carnival Cruise Line)
- Headquarters: Carnival Place, Doral, Florida, U.S.
- Area served: Worldwide
- Key people: Micky Arison (Chairman); Josh Weinstein (President and CEO)
- Brands: AIDA Cruises; Carnival Cruise Line; Costa Cruises; Cunard Line; Holland America Line; P&O Cruises; Princess Cruises; Seabourn
- Services: Cruise line
- Revenue: ▲US$26.622 billion (2025)
- Operating income: ▲US$4.483 billion (2025)
- Net income: ▲US$2.760 billion (2025)
- Total assets: ▲US$51.687 billion (2025)
- Total equity: ▲US$12.284 billion (2025)
- Number of employees: 101,000 (2025)
- Website: www.carnivalcorp.com

Carnival Corporation Ltd. is a Bermuda-domiciled American cruise line operator that owns more than 90 vessels across eight brands. Carnival is listed on the New York Stock Exchange, and is a component of the S&P 500 index. From 2003 to May 7, 2026, Carnival was a dual-listed company, consisting of U.S.-based and British corporations collectively known as Carnival Corporation & plc.

Carnival Corporation's operational headquarters are in Doral, Florida. Carnival also has significant UK operations, with regional headquarters in Southampton, England.

== History ==
Carnival Corporation was founded as the privately owned Carnival Cruise Line in 1972. The company grew steadily throughout the 1970s and 1980s. It went public in 1987 with an initial public offering on the New York Stock Exchange (NYSE), and used the money to buy up competing cruise lines. Between 1989 and 1999, it acquired Holland America Line, Windstar Cruises, Westours, Seabourn Cruise Line, Costa Cruises and Cunard Line. It adopted the name Carnival Corporation in 1993, to distinguish the parent company from its flagship cruise line subsidiary.

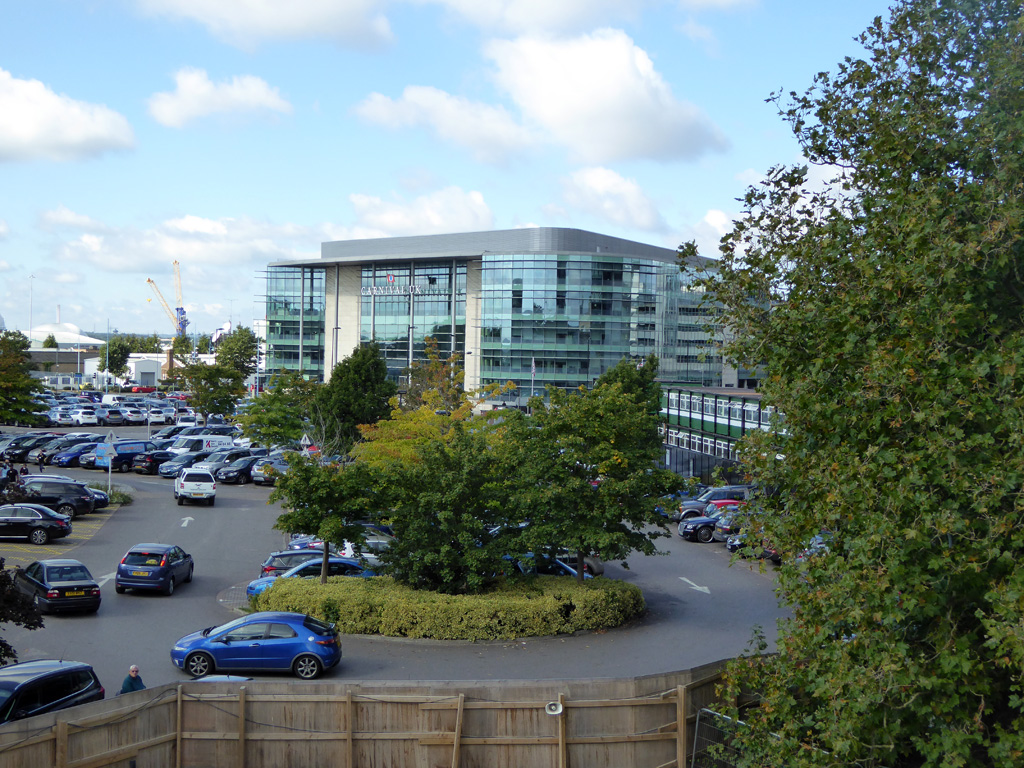
Carnival House, Southampton, the company's UK headquarters

P&O Princess Cruises plc was formed in 2000, after the demerger of the cruise ship division of the P&O group. Originating as the Peninsular and Oriental Steam Navigation Company in England in 1837, P&O operated the world's first commercial cruise ships. Restructuring of the P&O group in the 20th century led to its cruise operations being rebranded as P&O Cruises and P&O Cruises Australia, with the company acquiring Princess Cruises in 1974. Following the demerger in 2000, the company also acquired AIDA Cruises, as well as establishing the A'Rosa Cruises and Ocean Village brands.

In 2003, Carnival Corporation acquired P&O Princess Cruises plc. It was agreed that P&O Princess Cruises plc would remain a separate company, listed on the London Stock Exchange (LSE) and retaining its British shareholder body and management team. The company was renamed Carnival plc, with the operations of the two companies merged into one entity. Carnival Corporation and Carnival plc thereafter jointly owned all the operating companies in the Carnival group. Prior to Carnival Corporation's acquisition, P&O Princess Cruises plc had agreed to a merger with Royal Caribbean Cruises Ltd. The deal unraveled as Carnival Corporation initiated a hostile takeover with improved terms for British shareholders.

Carnival sold Windstar Cruises to Ambassadors Group in February 2007 and Swan Hellenic to Lord Sterling in March 2007.

In October 2015, CSSC Carnival Cruise Shipping, a joint venture between Carnival, the China Investment Corporation, and the China State Shipbuilding Corporation, was founded, with operations expected to commence in 2019.

In March 2018, Carnival Corporation announced its intention to invest in the construction of a new terminal in the port of Sasebo, Japan. Construction began in October 2019 and was expected to be open ahead of the Tokyo Olympic Games. While it was completed on schedule in 2020, the global COVID-19 pandemic halted cruise operations there until June 2024.

In June 2018, Carnival Corporation announced that it had acquired the White Pass and Yukon Route from TWC Enterprises Limited for US$290 million. The properties acquired were port, railroad and retail operations in Skagway, Alaska.

In 2023, Carnival Corporation sold their interest in Adora Cruises.

In May 2025, it was announced Carnival would move its headquarters from Doral and create a new campus where it would unite most of its North America team members in a single new headquarters to be built in the Waterford Business District, located in Miami-Dade County. It is scheduled to begin operations in 2028.

In December 2025, Carnival announced plans to simplify its corporate structure, with shares in Carnival plc being converted one-for-one into shares of Carnival Corporation, and the latter (previously incorporated in Panama) being reincorporated in Bermuda as Carnival Corporation Limited. As a result, the enterprise would give up Carnival plc's LSE and NYSE American depositary receipt listings, with the restructured Carnival maintaining a single listing on the NYSE. The company received court approval on May 1, 2026, allowing the scheme to proceed. Carnival announced the completion of this reorganization on May 7, 2026. This was done to enjoy Bermuda's tax benefits.

== Operations ==
The Carnival group comprises nine cruise line brands and one cruise experience brand operating a combined fleet of 93 ships.

In June 2023, Carnival restructured its corporate umbrella and created six new separate units that have full executive control of the brands in their portfolio.

=== Carnival Cruise Line ===
- Carnival Cruise Line – headquarters in Doral, Florida, U.S.
  - White Pass and Yukon Route
- Carnival Australia – headquarters in Chatswood, New South Wales, Australia

=== Carnival Maritime ===
- AIDA Cruises – headquarters in Rostock, Germany
- Costa Cruises – headquarters in Genoa, Italy

=== Carnival UK ===
- Cunard Line – headquarters in Southampton, UK
- P&O Cruises – headquarters in Southampton, UK

=== Holland America Group ===
- Holland America Line – headquarters in Seattle, Washington, U.S.
- Seabourn Cruise Line – headquarters in Seattle, Washington, U.S.

=== Princess Cruises ===
- Princess Cruises – headquarters in Santa Clarita, California, U.S.
  - Princess Tours

== Brands and ships ==
=== AIDA Cruises ===
AIDA Cruises originated from the state-owned East German shipping conglomerate Deutsche Seereederei, established in Rostock, Germany, in 1952. The company entered the passenger market in the 1960s, but after the unification of Germany in 1990, the company was privatised and its passenger ships acquired by Deutsche Seetouristik. In 1996, the company launched its first new cruise ship AIDA, but after failing to achieve a profit, the ship was sold to Norwegian Cruise Line, continuing operations under a charter agreement.

In 1999, Deutsche Seetouristik was acquired by British shipping company P&O, with the AIDA name being repurchased from NCL. P&O formed AIDA Cruises as a subsidiary brand, with two new ships ordered to form a fleet. AIDA was renamed AIDAcara, with AIDAvita and AIDAaura launched in 2002 and 2003 respectively. Carnival ordered new builds due in 2030 and 2032.

- AIDAdiva
- AIDAbella
- AIDAluna
- AIDAblu
- AIDAsol
- AIDAmar
- AIDAstella
- AIDAprima
- AIDAperla
- AIDAnova
- AIDAcosma

=== Carnival Cruise Line ===
Carnival Cruise Line was founded in 1972 as a subsidiary of American International Travel Service (AITS), by Ted Arison and Meshulam Riklis. Due to mounting debts, Riklis sold his stake in the company to Arison for $1 in 1974. Through the acquisition of existing ships the company continued to grow. In 1980, Carnival ordered its first new commission, the Tropicale, which was completed in 1981/2. Three further ships were commissioned during the 1980s, the Holiday (1985), Jubilee (1986) and Celebration (1987).

In 1987, Carnival completed an initial public offering of 20 percent of its common stock on the New York Stock Exchange, raising approximately $400m in capital. The capital raised was used to finance acquisitions, so in 1993 the business was restructured as a holding company, under the name Carnival Corporation, with Carnival Cruise Line becoming its principal subsidiary.

- Carnival Adventure
- Carnival Breeze
- Carnival Celebration
- Carnival Conquest
- Carnival Destiny (due 2029)
- Carnival Dream
- Carnival Elation
- Carnival Encounter
- Carnival Festivale (due 2027)
- Carnival Freedom
- Carnival Firenze
- Carnival Glory
- Carnival Horizon
- Carnival Jubilee
- Carnival Legend
- Carnival Liberty
- Carnival Luminosa
- Carnival Magic
- Mardi Gras
- Carnival Miracle
- Carnival Panorama
- Carnival Paradise
- Carnival Pride
- Carnival Radiance
- Carnival Spirit
- Carnival Splendor
- Carnival Sunshine
- Carnival Sunrise
- Carnival Tropicale (due 2028)
- Carnival Valor
- Carnival Venezia
- Carnival Vista
- Project ACE 2nd Newbuilding (2031)
- Project ACE 3rd Newbuilding (2033)

=== Costa Cruises ===
Costa Cruises originates from a cargo shipping company founded by Giacomo Costa fu Andrea in Genoa, Italy in 1854. Better known as Costa Line or C Line by the 1920s, its first passenger carrier was Maria C, a former U.S. Navy stores ship that was partly converted for passenger use and served various routes to North and South America from 1947 to 1953. The company's first dedicated passenger ship was the Anna C, a cargo vessel that was requisitioned for war time use by the Royal Navy and refitted as an accommodation ship before returning to merchant use.

Costa purchased the ship in 1947 and it operated between Italy and South America from 1948, later converting to full-time cruising and serving with the company until 1971. From the late 1960s until the 1980s, Costa rapidly developed its passenger operations into what we now recognise as modern cruise ships. In 1987, it consolidated its cruise ship operations into a new company, Costa Cruises, which at its peak, was the largest cruise ship operator in the world.

The takeover of Costa Cruises by Carnival Corporation began in 1997, as a 50/50 deal between Carnival and the British tour operator Airtours. On January 13, 2012, Costa Concordia, a ship operated by the line, hit an underwater rock and ran aground in Isola del Giglio, Tuscany, resulting in 32 deaths. Investigations proved that the captain and general bad organization was responsible for the disaster, and the company was fined.

- Costa Deliziosa
- Costa Diadema
- Costa Fascinosa
- Costa Favolosa
- Costa Pacifica
- Costa Serena
- Costa Smeralda
- Costa Toscana

=== Cunard Line ===
The second oldest brand in the Carnival group after P&O, Cunard Line originated in 1840 and celebrated its 180th anniversary in 2020. It was founded by Samuel Cunard, who was awarded the first trans-Atlantic mail contract in 1837 and established the British and North American Royal Mail Steam-Packet Company in 1840. After initially dominating the trans-Atlantic route, the need for new capital led to the company being re-organised as the Cunard Steamship Company Ltd in 1879. The early 1900s saw increased competition for speed, particularly from Germany, which led the British government to subsidise the building of Mauretania and Lusitania, which both won the Blue Riband. Competition continued to increase however and by the early 1930s, Cunard was experiencing financial difficulties. To secure further government subsidy, it agreed to merge with its chief rival White Star Line, to form Cunard-White Star Line in 1934. Cunard later purchased the remaining White Star shares in 1947, reverting to the name Cunard Line in 1949. Cunard continued to operate independently until 1971, when it was acquired by the conglomerate Trafalgar House, which was in turn taken over by the Norwegian company Kværner in 1996. In 1998, Carnival Corporation purchased a controlling stake in Cunard, completing the acquisition in 1999 to become sole shareholder. Since that time, Cunard has been one of Carnival's most high-profile brands, with the continued popularity of the famous Queen Elizabeth 2, and the development of the world's largest transatlantic ocean liner, Queen Mary 2, which continues to be the flagship of the fleet.

- Queen Mary 2
- Queen Victoria
- Queen Elizabeth
- Queen Anne

=== Holland America Line ===
Holland America Line originated as Plate, Reuchlin & Company, founded in Rotterdam, Netherlands, in 1871. Initially struggling to survive, the company went public in 1873, renamed Nederlandsch Amerikaansche Stoomvaart Maatschappij (NASM). The company grew quickly in the early years, acquiring several new ships, including SS Rotterdam, which operated the company's first passenger cruise in 1895. The company also quickly became known by its shortened English name, Holland America Line. By the early 1900s, the company had separated its cargo and passenger operations, with its passenger ships being identifiable by names ending with dam, a tradition which continues with Holland America cruise ships today. The development of container shipping in the 1960s, forced the company to make a decision between investing in new cargo ships, or cruise ships. It ultimately sold its cargo operations, becoming exclusively a cruise ship company in 1973. Holland America continued to thrive well into the 1980s, consolidating its business with the acquisitions of Westours, Windstar Cruises and Home Lines. In 1989 however, it was itself the subject of an acquisition, when it was purchased in full by Carnival Corporation.

- Eurodam
- Koningsdam
- Nieuw Amsterdam
- Noordam
- Oosterdam
- Nieuw Statendam
- Rotterdam
- Volendam
- Westerdam
- Zaandam
- Zuiderdam

=== P&O Cruises ===
P&O Cruises was originally a subsidiary of the British shipping company P&O and was founded in 1977. Along with P&O Cruises Australia, it has the oldest heritage of any cruise line in the world, dating to P&O's first passenger operations in 1837. P&O Cruises was divested from P&O in 2000, subsequently becoming a subsidiary of P&O Princess Cruises, before coming under the ownership of Carnival Corporation & plc in 2003, following the merger between P&O Princess Cruises and Carnival Corporation. P&O Cruises is based in Southampton, England, and operates a fleet of seven ships, dedicated to serving the British market.

- Arcadia
- Arvia
- Aurora
- Azura
- Britannia
- Iona
- Ventura

=== Princess Cruises ===
- Caribbean Princess
- Coral Princess
- Crown Princess
- Diamond Princess
- Discovery Princess
- Emerald Princess
- Enchanted Princess
- Grand Princess
- Island Princess
- Majestic Princess
- Regal Princess
- Royal Princess
- Ruby Princess
- Sapphire Princess
- Sky Princess
- Sun Princess
- Star Princess

=== Seabourn Cruise Line ===
- Seabourn Encore
- Seabourn Ovation
- Seabourn Pursuit
- Seabourn Quest
- Seabourn Venture

=== Ships on order ===
Carnival Corporation currently has ten ships under construction or under agreement.

Carnival Corp Order Book
| Cruise Line | Name | Cost (millions) | Shipyard | Tonnage | Capacity | Delivery |
|---|---|---|---|---|---|---|
| Carnival | Carnival Festivale | $1,200 | Meyer Werft | 183,900 | 5,400 | 2027 |
| Carnival | Carnival Tropicale | $1,200 | Meyer Werft | 183,900 | 5,400 | 2028 |
| Carnival | Carnival Destiny | $1,750 | Fincantieri | 230,000 | 6,200 | 2029 |
| AIDA | Unnamed | $1,300 | Fincantieri | 150,000 | 4,200 | 2030 |
| Carnival | Project Ace | $1,750 | Fincantieri | 230,000 | 6,200 | 2031 |
| AIDA | Unnamed | $1,300 | Fincantieri | 150,000 | 4,200 | 2031 |
| Carnival | Project Ace | $1,750 | Fincantieri | 230,000 | 6,200 | 2033 |
| Princess Cruises | Voyager Class | TBA | Fincantieri | 183,000 | 4,700 | 2035 |
| Princess Cruises | Voyager Class | TBA | Fincantieri | 183,000 | 4,700 | 2038 |
| Princess Cruises | Voyager Class | TBA | Fincantieri | 183,000 | 4,700 | 2039 |

=== Former brands ===
- Adora Cruises - Established as a joint operation in 2015, sold their interest in 2023
- A-Rosa Cruises – Established by P&O Princess in 2001, sold following the Carnival merger in 2003
- Fathom – Established by the Carnival Corporation in 2015 – Ended cruise operations in 2017. Its functions were reduced to operating as a tour group until the end of 2018.
- Fiesta Marina Cruises – Established by Carnival Corp in 1993, liquidated in 1994. The sole ship was sold to the Epirotiki Line.
- Ibero Cruises – Established by Carnival Corp in 2003, liquidated in 2014 with ships transferred to Costa Cruises and Cruise & Maritime Voyages.
- Ocean Village – Established by P&O Princess in 2003, liquidated in 2010 with ship transferred to P&O Cruises Australia
- P&O Cruises Australia – Carnival subsidiary from 2003, absorbed into Carnival Cruise Line in 2025.
- Swan Hellenic – P&O Princess subsidiary from 1983, liquidated in 2007 with ship transferred to Princess Cruises
- Windstar Cruises – Carnival subsidiary from 1989, sold to Ambassadors International in 2007.

== Private islands and beach resorts ==
Carnival Corporation has multiple privates islands and beach ports used by their different brands.

- Princess Cay: located southern end of the island of Eleuthera, The Bahamas, anchor port utilized by both Princess Cruises and Carnival Cruise Line.
- Half Moon Cay: island in The Bahamas, original utilized by just Holland American Line, planned pier addition in the future.
- Amber Cove: private beach for Carnival Corporation in Puerto Plata Province in the Dominican Republic.
- Celebration Key: located the south side of Grand Bahama island, private beach resort for Carnival corporation.

== Incidents and violations ==
=== Violations of environmental laws ===
In 2002 the Carnival Corporation pleaded guilty in United States District Court in Miami to criminal charges related to falsifying records of the oil-contaminated bilge water that six of its ships dumped into the sea from 1996 through 2001. The Carnival Corporation was ordered to pay $18 million in fines and perform community service, received five years' probation and must submit to a court-supervised worldwide environmental-compliance program for each of its cruise ships.

For dumping oiled waste into the seas and lying to cover it up, Princess Cruise Lines was fined $40 million in 2016. According to federal authorities, it was the "largest-ever criminal penalty" for intentional vessel pollution. Officials said that these practices began in 2005 and persisted until August 2013, when a newly hired engineer blew the whistle. As part of its plea agreement, ships of the parent company Carnival Cruise lines were subjected to a court supervised environmental compliance plan for five years.

For violation of the probation terms of 2016 Carnival and its Princess line were ordered to pay an additional $20 million penalty in 2019. The new violations included discharging plastic into waters in The Bahamas, falsifying records, and interfering with court supervision.

=== Effects of the COVID-19 pandemic ===
All cruise ship itineraries were cancelled in March 2020 due to the worldwide pandemic and eventually, 55 passengers on ships owned by Carnival Corporation & plc were reported as having died. After months of cancelled cruises, Carnival Corporation & plc announced in September 2020 that it intended to dispose of 18 ships, a full 12% of the global fleet. By that time, five ships had already been scrapped: Carnival Fantasy, Carnival Fascination, Carnival Imagination, Carnival Inspiration and Costa Victoria.

The corporation also announced that it was delaying the delivery of several ships already on order. These steps were part of the company's cost-cutting plan, important because the "pause in guest operations continues to have a material negative impact on all aspects of the company's business, including the company's liquidity, financial position and results of operations". The adjusted net loss in the third quarter was reported by the corporation to the U.S. Securities and Exchange Commission as US$1.7 billion.

As of September 2020, the no-sail rule by the Centers for Disease Control and Prevention prohibited cruising in the U.S. until October 31, 2020, at the earliest. Members of the Cruise Lines International Association, including Carnival Corporation & plc, had announced in early August that its members were extending a voluntary suspension until October 31; that applied to cruises that were to depart from the U.S. or planned to stop at U.S. ports of call.

In November 2020, the CEO said he was confident that "universal testing, which doesn't exist in any other industry of scale" would help start the cruising industry.

The company's fourth quarter (ending 30 November 2020) financial statement released on January 11, 2021, indicated that one extra ship, in addition to the 18 previously planned, was to be sold. Carnival Corporation was in an excellent cash position, with US$9.5 billion, but suffered an adjusted net loss of $1.9 billion in the quarter.

== Notable former ships ==
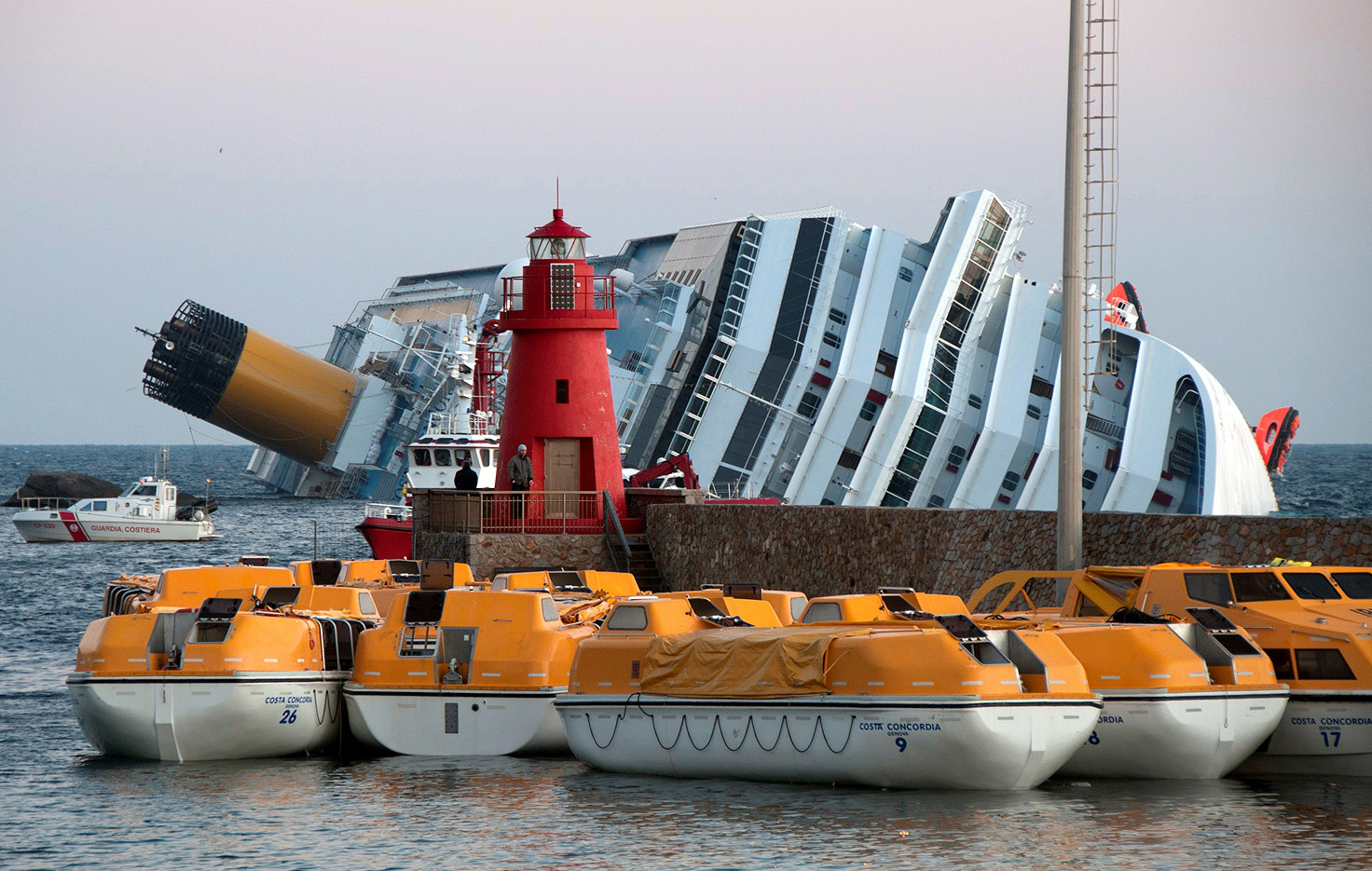
Costa Concordia after sinking

Carnival has had various notable ships in the past including:

- Pacific Princess (Princess Cruises) – Became famous for appearing in the romantic comedy anthology TV series The Love Boat and was featured in nearly every episode. She sailed for Princess Cruises from 1975 to 2002.
- Queen Elizabeth 2 (Cunard Line) – The flagship of Cunard Line when acquired by Carnival Corporation. She was sold to Istithmar World in 2008.
- Rotterdam (Holland America Line) – The flagship of Holland America Line for 40 years. She was sold to Premier Cruises in 1997 and renamed Rembrandt. She currently operates under her original name as a floating hotel and museum in Rotterdam, Netherlands.
- Costa Concordia (Costa Cruises) – Struck a rock and sank off the coast of Isola del Giglio, Italy in 2012, in the Costa Concordia disaster. Thirty-two passengers and crew members were killed, along with one salvage operator, while 64 other people were injured.
- Adonia (Fathom and P&O Cruises) – First cruise ship to sail to Cuba from the United States mainland (in 2019) since the United States embargo against Cuba over 40 years prior. She was sold to Azamara Club Cruises in 2018 and renamed Azamara Pursuit.
- Oriana (P&O Cruises) – The first cruise ship commissioned for the UK market. She was sold to Astro Ocean in 2019 and renamed Piano Land.
- Adora Magic City (Adora Cruises) – The first cruise ship built in China.

== Business trend ==
| | 2016 | 2017 | 2018 | 2019 | 2020 | 2021 | 2022 | 2023 | 2024 | 2025 |
|---|---|---|---|---|---|---|---|---|---|---|
| Total revenue (USD bn) | 16.4 | 17.5 | 18.9 | 20.8 | 5.6 | 1.9 | 12.2 | 21.6 | 25.0 | 26.6 |
| Operating income (USD bn) | 3.0 | 3.2 | 3.4 | 3.3 | −4.9 | −6.3 | −4.0 | 1.9 | 3.5 | 4.4 |
| Net income (USD bn) | 2.8 | 2.6 | 3.2 | 3.0 | −10.2 | −9.5 | −6.0 | −0.1 | 1.9 | 2.8 |
| Total assets (USD bn) | 38.9 | 40.8 | 42.4 | 45.1 | 53.6 | 53.3 | 51.7 | 49.1 | 49.1 | 51.7 |
| Total equity (USD bn) | 22.6 | 24.2 | 24.4 | 25.4 | 20.6 | 12.1 | 7.1 | 6.9 | 9.3 | 12.3 |
