= AIDAstella =

Cruise ship built in 2013

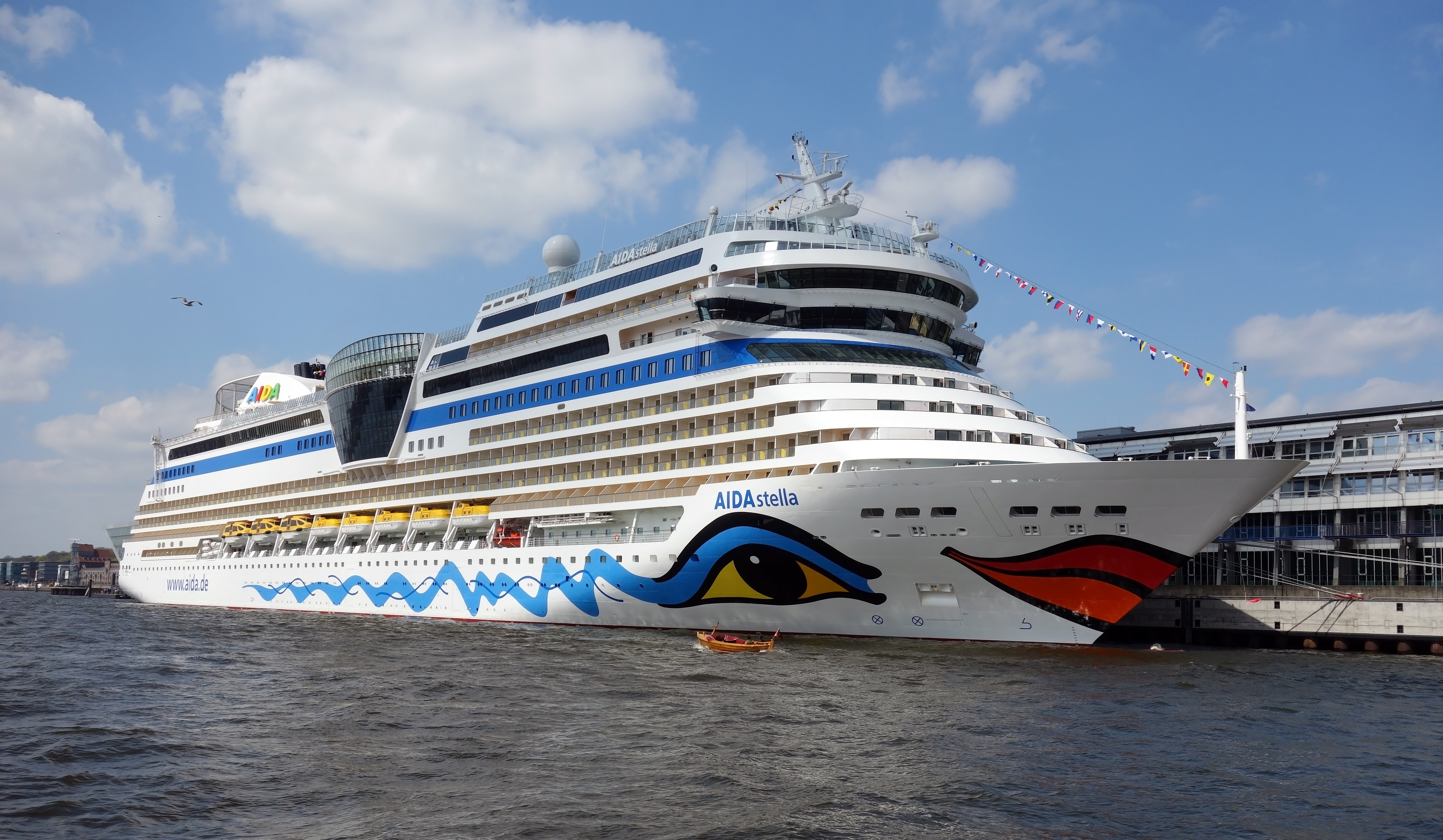
- AIDAstella in port of Hamburg on 5 May 2013

History

Italy
- Name: AIDAstella
- Owner: Costa Crociere S.p.A.
- Operator: AIDA Cruises
- Port of registry: Genoa, Italy
- Builder: Meyer Werft
- Yard number: 695
- Laid down: 17 December 2008
- Launched: 25 January 2013
- Christened: 16 March 2013 in Warnemünde by 10 ladies
- Completed: 11 March 2013
- Maiden voyage: 17 March 2013
- In service: 17 March 2013
- Identification: Call sign: ICUP; IMO number: 9601132; MMSI number: 247322800; DNV ID: 115489
- Status: In service

General characteristics
- Class & type: Sphinx-class cruise ship (modified)
- Tonnage: 71,304 GT; 45,266 NT; 7,833 DWT
- Length: 253.26 m (830.91 ft)
- Beam: 32.2 m (105.64 ft)
- Height: 61 m (200 ft)
- Draught: 7.3 m (23.95 ft)
- Decks: 14
- Installed power: 36,000 kW (combined)
- Propulsion: Diesel-electric; two shafts (2 × 12,500 kW): Fixed-pitch propellers; Two bow thrusters; Two stern thrusters
- Speed: 21 knots (39 km/h; 24 mph)
- Capacity: 2,700 Passengers (maximum)
- Crew: 620

AIDAstella is a Sphinx-class cruise ship, built at Meyer Werft for AIDA Cruises. She is the seventh Sphinx series ship, preceded by sisters AIDAdiva, AIDAbella, AIDAluna, AIDAblu, AIDAsol and AIDAmar. AIDAstella was delivered to the shipping company by Meyer Werft on 11 March 2013.

AIDAstella is of the same size as her sister ships (71,300 Gross Tons). Two five bladed propellers drive her through the water at 23 knots. She also features a pair of bow thrusters, a pair of stern thrusters, a pair of stabilisers and twin rudders.

From 3 to 8 March 2018, AIDAstella underwent a dry dock in Dubai during which various public venues were refurbished.
