= AIDAsol =

Cruise ship built in 2011

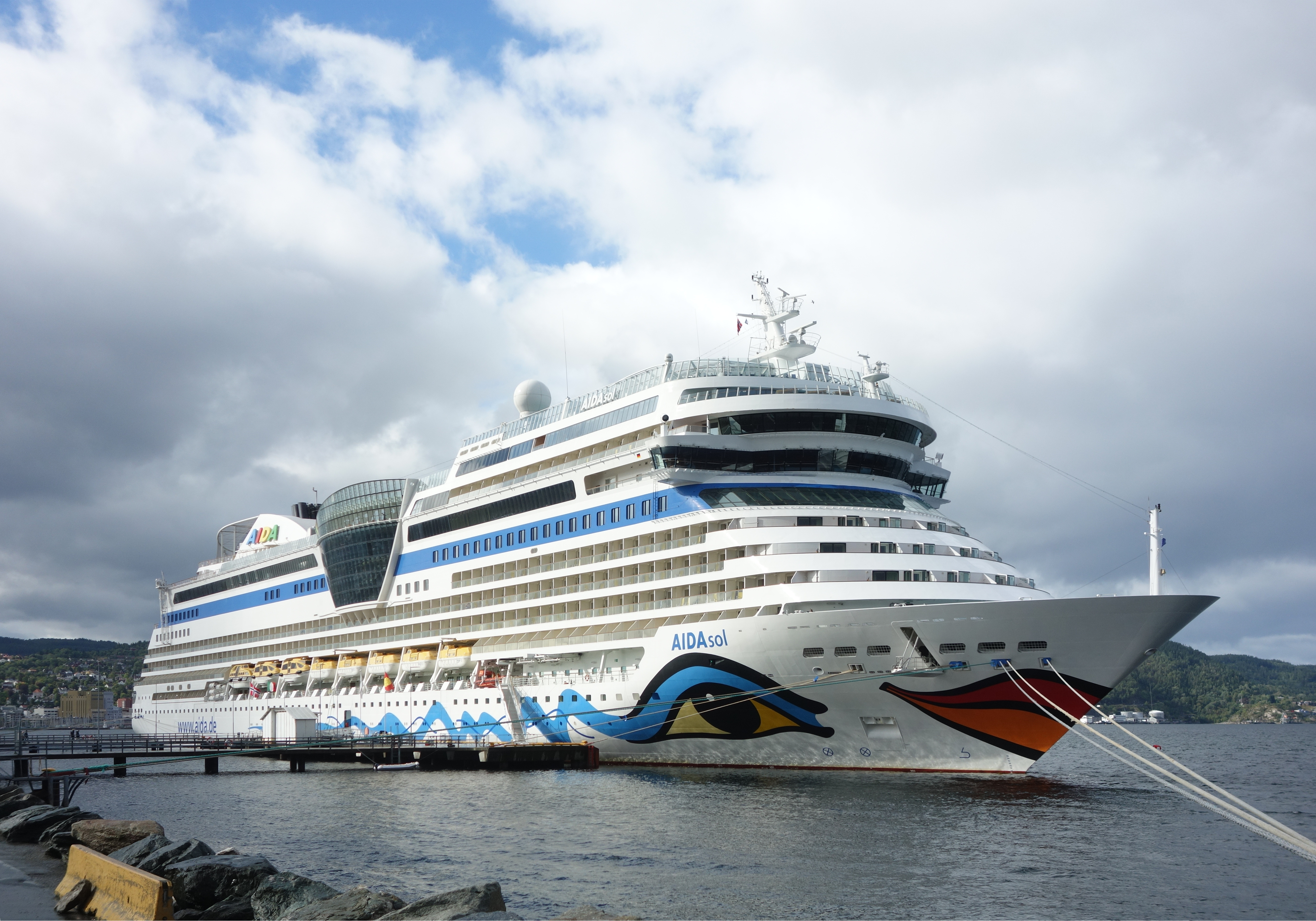
- AIDAsol at anchor in Trondheim.

History

Italy
- Name: AIDAsol
- Owner: 2011-2023: Costa Crociere; 2023–present Carnival Corporation & plc
- Operator: AIDA Cruises
- Port of registry: Genoa, Italy
- Builder: Meyer Werft
- Launched: 27 February 2011
- Completed: Early 2011
- In service: 2011–present
- Identification: Call sign: ICPE; IMO number: 9490040; MMSI number: 247302900
- Status: In service

General characteristics
- Class & type: Sphinx series cruise ship
- Tonnage: 71,304 GT
- Length: 253.33 m (831 ft 2 in)
- Beam: 32.2 m (105 ft 8 in) (waterline); 37.6 m (123 ft 4 in) (max)
- Height: 61 m (200 ft 2 in)
- Draught: 7.3 m (23 ft 11 in)
- Depth: 9.3 m (30 ft 6 in)
- Installed power: 4 × Cat MaK 9M43C
- Capacity: 2,192 passengers

AIDAsol is a Sphinx-class cruise ship, built at Meyer Werft for AIDA Cruises. She is the fifth Sphinx series ship, preceded by sisters AIDAdiva, AIDAbella, AIDAluna, and AIDAblu, and followed by AIDAmar and AIDAstella. AIDAsol was delivered in March 2010. She was christened on 9 April 2011.

== Concept and construction ==
AIDAsol was ordered on 13 December 2007, together with her unnamed sister, at Meyer Werft by Carnival Corporation & plc, the parent company of AIDA. It also marked the decision to increase the tonnage and capacity of the then under construction AIDAblu, to 71,000 GT and 2,174 passengers, which makes AIDAsol and AIDAmar her twin sisters in the Sphinx class. The naming ceremony was on 9 April 2011 in Kiel, Germany.

AIDAsol is similarly designed from her latest predecessor, AIDAblu. Facilities included are an additional deck, an onboard brewery and a 2,300-m^{2} spa facility. AIDAsol is 252 meters in length and 32 meters wide.
