= AIDAmar =

Cruise ship built in 2012

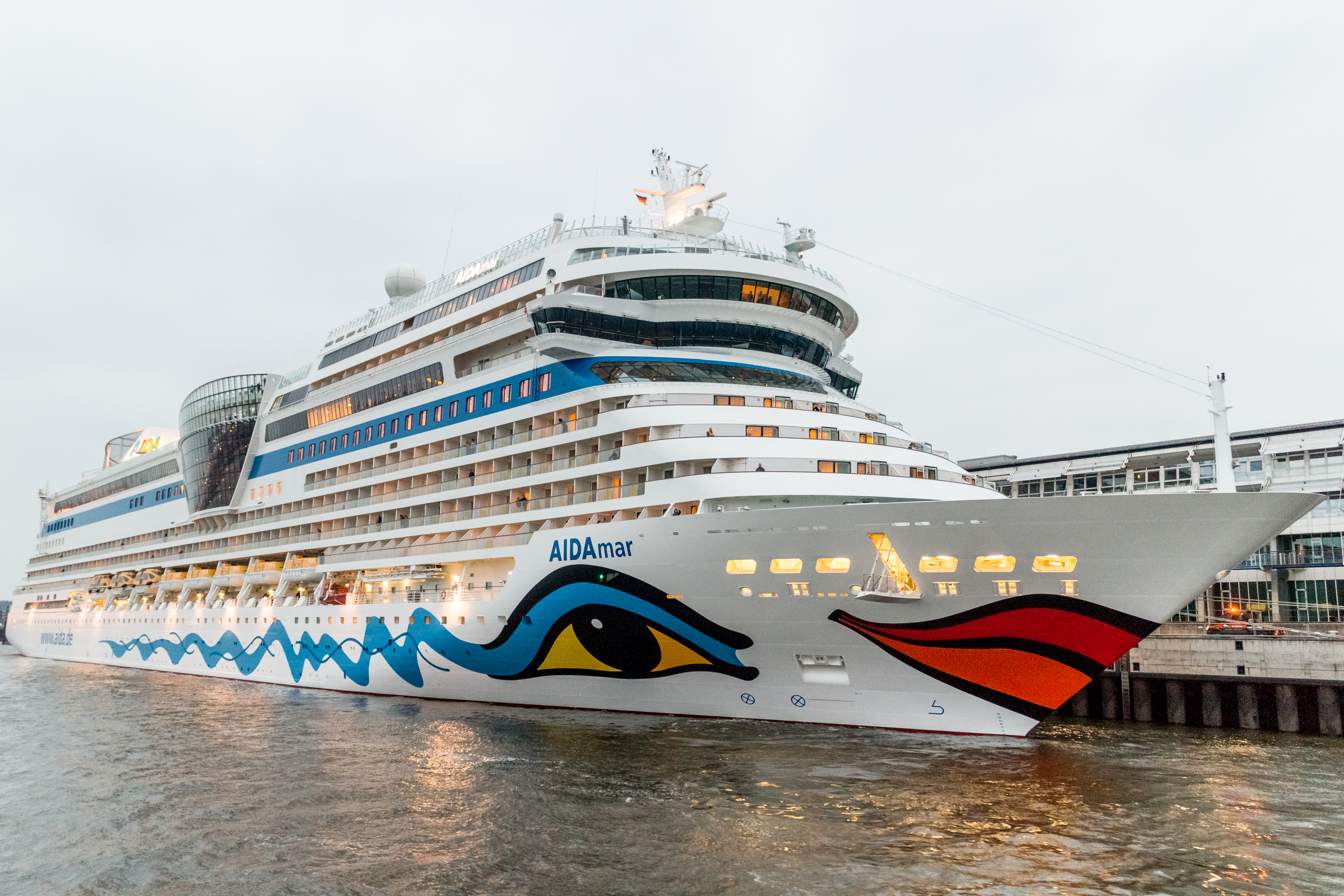
- AIDAmar at Hamburg Cruise Center Altona, 2015

History

Italy
- Name: AIDAmar
- Owner: Costa Crociere
- Operator: AIDA Cruises
- Port of registry: Genoa, Italy
- Ordered: 19 December 2007
- Builder: Meyer Werft
- Yard number: S.690
- Laid down: 20 October 2008
- Launched: 1 April 2012
- Completed: 3 May 2012
- Identification: Call sign: ICSJ; IMO number: 9490052; MMSI number: 247312900
- Status: In service

General characteristics
- Class & type: Icarus-class cruise ship
- Tonnage: 71,304 GT; 45,123 NT; 7,757 DWT
- Length: 253.22 m (830 ft 9 in)
- Beam: 32.2 m (105 ft 8 in)
- Height: 61 m (200 ft)
- Draught: 7.3 m (23 ft 11 in)
- Installed power: 36,000 kW (48,000 hp) (combined)
- Propulsion: Diesel-electric; two shafts (2 × 12,500 kW, 16,800 hp); Fixed-pitch propellers; Two bow thrusters; Two stern thrusters
- Speed: 21 knots (39 km/h; 24 mph)
- Capacity: 2,192 passengers
- Crew: 620

AIDAmar is an Icarus-class cruise ship, built at Meyer Werft for AIDA Cruises. She is the sixth Sphinx series ship, preceded by sisters AIDAdiva, AIDAbella, AIDAluna, AIDAblu, AIDAsol, and followed by AIDAstella. AIDAmar was delivered to the shipping company by Meyer Werft on 3 May 2012.

AIDAmar was christened in Hamburg on 12 May 2012.

== Concept and construction ==
AIDAmar was ordered on 13 December 2007 from Meyer Werft by Carnival Corporation, the parent company of AIDA.

On 1 April 2012, AIDAmar was floated to Meyer Werft in Papenburg. AIDAmar is fifth in a series of six ships ordered by the German company AIDA Cruises, the ship measuring 252 metres (826 ft 9 in) long and 32.2 m (105 ft 8 in) wide. Displaying a gauge 71,300 tons, it has 1,096 cabins. Facilities included are an additional deck, an onboard brewery and a 2,300 m^{2} (25,000 sq ft) spa facility. AIDAmar is a sister ship of AIDAblu and AIDAsol, delivered in 2010 and 2011 respectively. These ships are slightly larger than the first three series units, AIDAdiva, AIDAbella and AIDAluna (68,500 tons, 1,025 cabins), completed in 2007, 2008 and 2009 by Meyer Werft.

After leaving the hall building covered in Papenburg, AIDAmar went down the Ems River in mid-April to reach the North Sea and to conduct its tests before its release in May of the same year. The last ship of the class, AIDAstella, was delivered by Meyer Werft in late 2013.
