= AIDA Cruises =

German cruise line

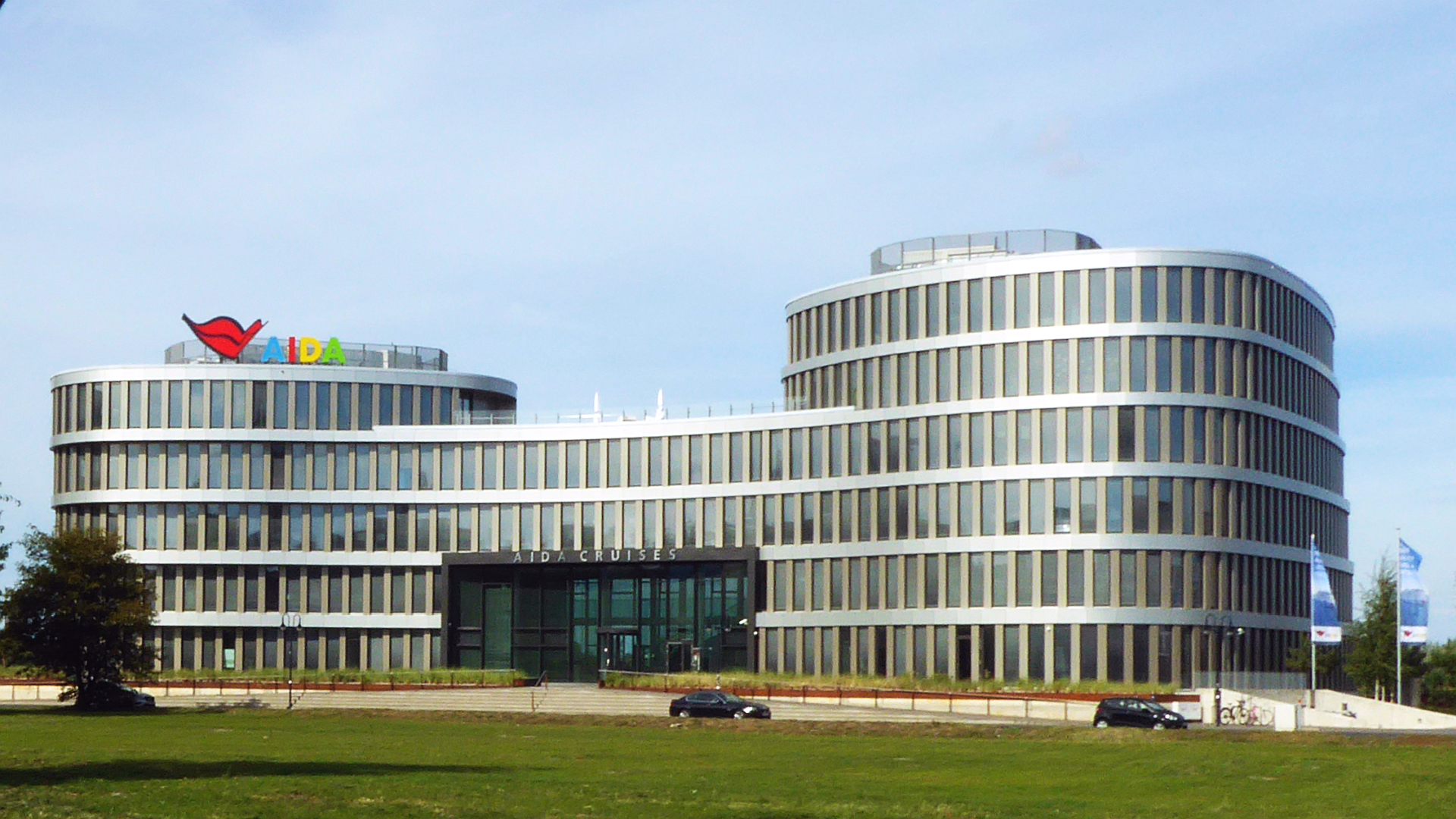
- AIDA Cruises head office
- Type: Subsidiary
- Industry: Tourism
- Founded: 1960; 66 years ago
- Headquarters: Rostock, Germany
- Products: Cruises
- Parent: Costa Cruises (of Carnival Corporation)
- Website: aida.de

AIDA Cruises is a German cruise line founded in the early 1960s and organized as a wholly owned subsidiary of Costa Cruises, which in turn belongs to Carnival Corporation. Based in Rostock, Germany, AIDA Cruises caters primarily to the German-speaking market; as seagoing "club resorts", AIDA ships have on-board amenities and facilities designed to attract younger, more active vacationers. As of September 2023, the cruise line operates 11 ships.

AIDA Cruises has been Carnival-owned since 2003.

== History ==
The company was founded in 1952 as VEB Deutsche Seereederei Rostock (German Shipping Company Rostock) as the German Democratic Republic's state-owned shipping company, based at Rostock, and became VEB Deutfracht/Seereederei Rostock in 1973. It began its passenger operations with Völkerfreundschaft ("Peoples' Friendship"), in the 1960s. After the reunification of Germany in the early 1990s Deutfracht/Seereederei Rostock was privatised and became Deutsche Seereederei Rostock GmbH. DSR acquired Seetours of Bremen and cruises were marketed under the Seetours brand. On 1 January 1998, DSR split their operations into cargo and tourism, with a new company Arkona Touristik taking over the cruise business. In 2000 a company was formed, known as AIDA Cruises, with P&O Cruises acquiring a 51% stake in the new organisation, and Arkona Touristik retaining the other 49%.

=== As subsidiary of Carnival Corporation & plc ===
In 2001, P&O Princess Cruises acquired the remaining 49% interest in AIDA and the cruise business associated with Seetours International. In 2003, P&O Princess merged with Carnival Corporation, to form Carnival Corporation, the world's largest cruise holiday company. The Seetours cruise business, that had been acquired by P&O, was rebranded as AIDA Cruises in 2004.

Following the merger, executive control of AIDA Cruises was transferred to Costa Cruises, one of the main operating companies of Carnival Corporation & plc, with responsibility for the group's European brands. AIDA Cruises is now one of ten brands owned by Carnival Corporation & plc, based at Miami, Florida. AIDA cruises has been led by President Felix Eichhorn since 1 September 2015. In 2025, it accounted for 4.1% of the worldwide cruise line market share.

In October 2017, AIDAcara departed from Hamburg on the company's first World Cruise. After a 116-day sailing, the ship returned to Hamburg on 10 February 2018. The ship visited Southampton, Lisbon, Madeira, Rio de Janeiro, Ushuaia, Easter Island, Tahiti, Singapore, and the Maldives, among other destinations. On 8 October 2018, AIDAaura left Hamburg on the company's second World Cruise; the 117-day voyage visited 41 ports in 20 countries on four continents. Several of the destinations were new to the company, including South Africa, Namibia, Melbourne, Tasmania, Fiji, Samoa and New Caledonia.

In December 2018, AIDA debuted AIDAnova, the first cruise ship to be fully powered by liquefied natural gas (LNG). Earlier, in May 2016, AIDAprima and AIDAsol had become the first two ships in the AIDA fleet to be simultaneously powered by LNG. In August 2019, AIDA signed an agreement with Corvus Energy to install battery storage systems for the electrification of their ships. In October 2019, AIDA announced that it would test a new fuel-cell technology for large-scale cruise ships aboard the AIDAnova as early as 2021.

History of AIDA Cruises
Company name	Dates
VEB Deutsche Seereederei Rostock (DSR)	1952–1974
VEB Deutfracht/SeereedereiRostock	1974–1990/1993
Deutsche Seereederei Touristik & Seetours	1994–1997
Arkona Touristik	1998–1999
AIDA Cruises	1999–present

== Fleet ==
=== Current fleet ===
Ship	Built	Builder	Entered service for AIDA	Pax	Gross tonnage	Flag	Notes	Image
Sphinx Class
AIDAdiva	2007	Meyer Werft	2007–present	2,050	69,203 tons	Italy		
AIDAbella	2008	Meyer Werft	2008–present	2,050	69,203 tons	Italy		
AIDAluna	2009	Meyer Werft	2009–present	2,050	69,203 tons	Italy		
Icarus Class
AIDAblu	2010	Meyer Werft	2010–present	2,192	71,304 tons	Italy	The name was used for a former AIDA ship from 2004 to 2007.	
AIDAsol	2011	Meyer Werft	2011–present	2,192	71,304 tons	Italy		
AIDAmar	2012	Meyer Werft	2012–present	2,192	71,304 tons	Italy		
AIDAstella	2013	Meyer Werft	2013–present	2,192	71,304 tons	Italy		
Hyperion Class
AIDAprima	2016	Mitsubishi	2016–present	3,286	125,572 tons	Italy	Delivered on 14 March 2016 and began operating on 25 April (flagship of AIDA)	
AIDAperla	2017	Mitsubishi	2017–present	3,286	125,572 tons	Italy	Delivered on 27 April 2017 and began operating on 28 May	
Excellence Class
AIDAnova	2018	Meyer Werft	2018–present	5,252	183,858 tons	Italy	Largest ship ever built and operating for AIDA Delivered on 12 December 2018 and performed inaugural cruise on 19 December 2018	
AIDAcosma	2021	Meyer Werft	2021–present	5,464	183,858 tons	Italy	Steel cutting ceremony 15 August 2019; Delivered on 21 December 2021	

=== Former fleet ===
==== As Deutsche Seereederei/DSR/Arkona Touristik ====
Ship	Built	In service for Deutsche Seereederei	Gross tonnage	Flag	Notes	Image
Völkerfreundschaft	1948	1960–1985	16,144 GRT	East Germany	Ex-Stockholm. Later sailed as Volker, Fridtjof Nansen, Italia I, Italia Prima, Valtur Prima, Caribe, Athena, and Azores for various cruise lines. Former Astoria for Cruise & Maritime Voyages. Laid up in Ghent awaiting to be scrapped as of 2025.	
Arkona	1981	1985–2001	18,853 GRT	East Germany/Germany	Originally operated by HADAG as Astor. Was later sold to Transocean Tours as Astoria in 2002. Sailed as Saga Pearl II with Saga Cruises. Sold for scrap in 2022.	

==== AIDA former fleet ====
Ship	Class	Built	Builder	In service for AIDA Cruises	Gross tonnage	Flag	Notes	Image
AIDAblu	Crown	1990	Fincantieri	2004–2007	69,845 tons	Italy	Before entering AIDA fleet in 2004: Crown Princess and A'Rosa Blu After exiting AIDA fleet in 2007: Ocean Village Two, Pacific Jewel, and Karnika. Scrapped in Alang in 2020.	
AIDAcara		1996	Kvaerner Masa-Yards (Finland)	1996–2021	38,557 tons	Italy	Previously AIDA. Sold in 2021 to a currently unnamed company, renamed Astoria Grande.	
Unnamed	Excellence	2023	Meyer Werft	Never entered service	183,858 tons	Italy	Ordered on 27 February 2018 with Meyer Werft. Ship transferred to Carnival Cruise Line during construction.	
AIDAmira	Mistral	1999	Chantiers de l'Atlantique	2019– 2022	48,200 tons	Italy	Transferred from Costa Cruises and formerly sailed as Costa neoRiviera. It was sold in 2022 to Ambassador Cruise Line and now operates as MS Ambition.	
AIDAvita		2002	Aker MTW	2002– 2023	42,289 tons	Italy	Sold, now operating as Blue Dream Melody for Blue Dream Cruises	
AIDAaura		2003	Aker MTW	2003–2023	42,289 tons	Italy	Decommissioned on 21 September 2023, now operating as Celestyal Discovery for Celestyal Cruises	

=== Future fleet ===
In April 2025, the order of two ships at Fincantieri was announced. The delivery is planned for early 2030 and late 2031. The contract was concluded on 7 April 2025.
