= AIDAluna =

Cruise ship built in 2009

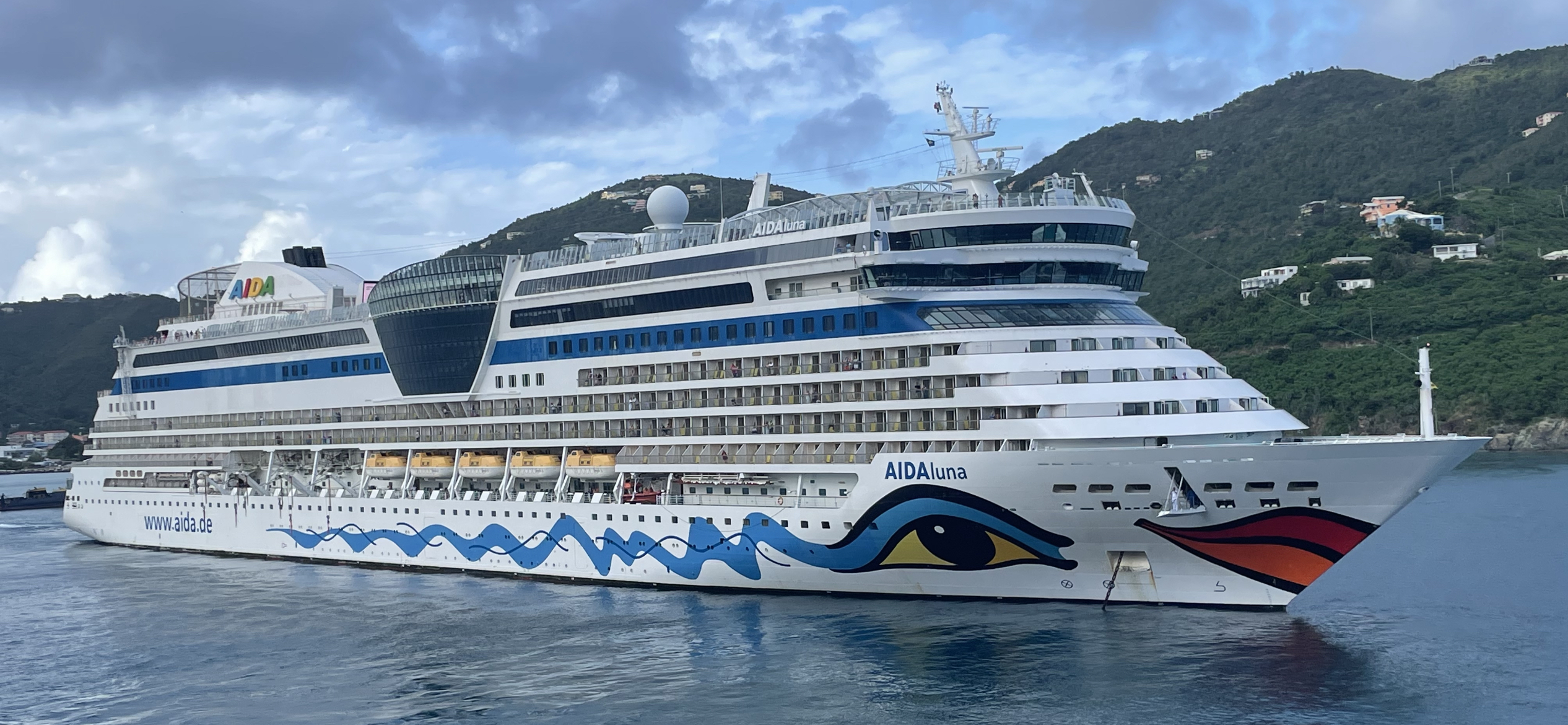
- AIDAluna at Tortola, February 2024

History

Italy
- Name: AIDAluna
- Owner: AIDA Cruises
- Operator: AIDA Cruises
- Port of registry: Genoa, Italy
- Builder: Meyer Werft
- Cost: €315 million
- Launched: 13 February 2009
- Christened: 4 April 2009 by Franziska Knuppe
- Maiden voyage: 22 March 2009
- In service: 2009–present
- Identification: IMO number: 9334868; Callsign: ICLP; MMSI number: 247255400
- Status: In service

General characteristics
- Class & type: Sphinx-class cruise ship
- Tonnage: 69,203 GT; 8,654 DWT
- Length: 251.89 m (826 ft 5 in)
- Beam: 32.2 m (105 ft 8 in)
- Height: 61 m (200 ft 2 in)
- Draught: 7.3 m (23 ft 11 in)
- Decks: 13 decks
- Installed power: 4 × Caterpillar MaK 9M43C at 36,000 kW (48,000 hp)
- Propulsion: diesel-electric producing 25,000 kW (34,000 hp)
- Speed: 22 knots (41 km/h; 25 mph)
- Capacity: 2,100 passengers
- Crew: 607

AIDAluna is a Sphinx-class cruise ship, owned by the United States-based Carnival Corp and operated by AIDA Cruises. Built by Meyer Werft shipyards at Papenburg, Germany, she is the third ship of the class, preceded by AIDAdiva and AIDAbella, and is followed by AIDAblu, AIDAsol, and AIDAmar. The ship has a capacity of 2,100 passengers and is assessed at 69,203 gross tonnage (GT). AIDAluna initially deployed in the Baltic Sea for the 2009 Summer season. In Winter 2009, she redeployed to the Canary Islands. AIDAluna has an 8-by-4.5-metre (26 ft × 15 ft) poolside theater, which is a first for AIDA Cruises.

== Concept and construction ==
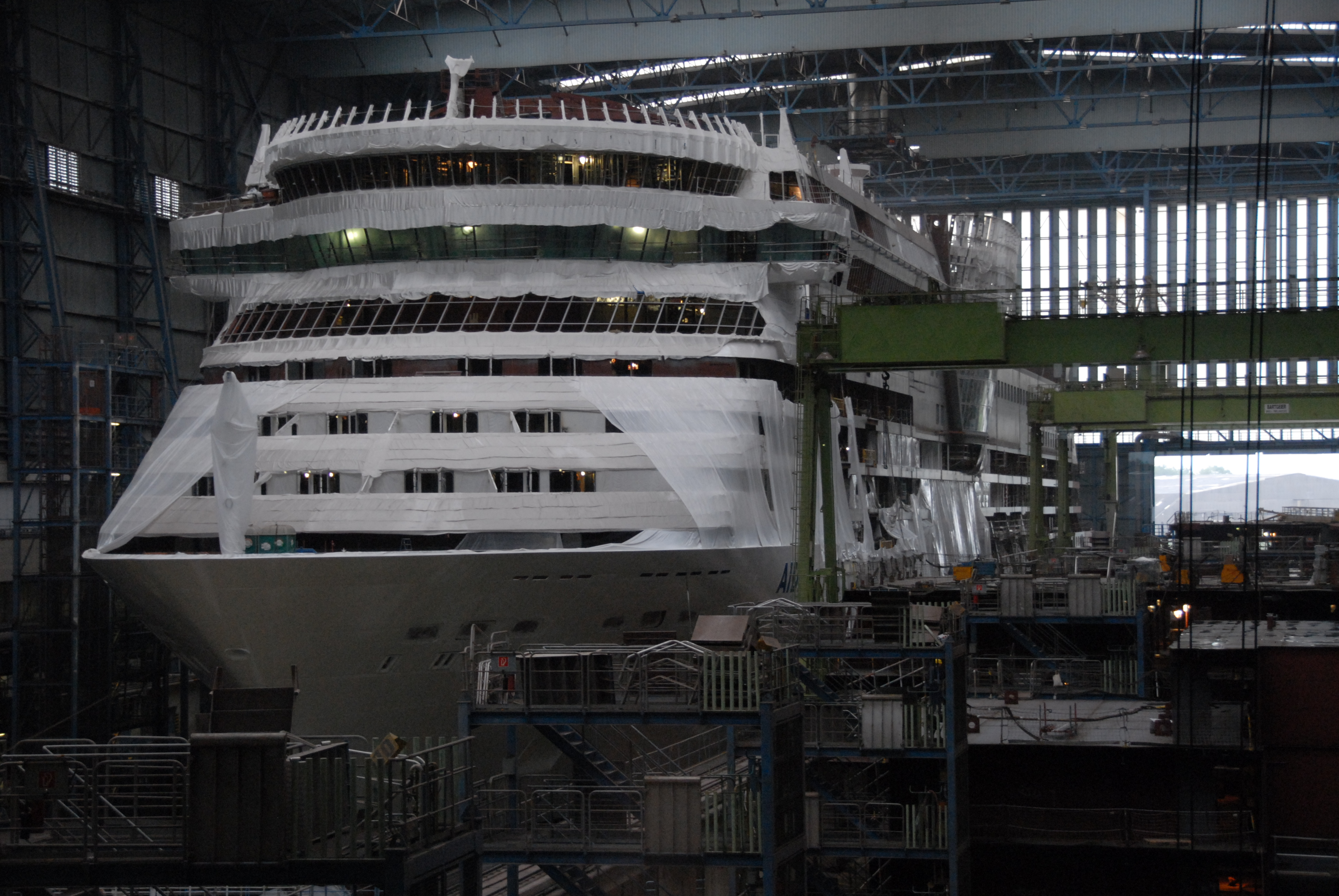
AIDAluna during construction at the Meyer Werft shipyards at Papenburg

AIDAluna is the third ship, out of a series of six Sphinx-class ships, ordered by AIDA Cruises from Meyer Werft, with expected delivery of one ship each year from 2007 to 2012. She is a sister ship of AIDAdiva, AIDAbella, AIDAblu, AIDAsol, and AIDAmar. The first order was only for two ships, but the option extended to six ships. She floated out of drydock on 10 February 2009. AIDAluna started her sea trials with her passage on the River Ems on 21 February 2009, departing Papenburg. The voyage culminated at Emden the next day. On 23 February, departing Emden to continue sea trials, she ventured to the Blohm + Voss shipyard in Hamburg for final inspection at dock Elbe 17. During the inspection, an object was seen, being tangled on AIDAluna's propellers, which was supposedly caused by the ship's short trip. After a few days, AIDAluna was cleared and continued her sea trials in the North Sea. AIDAluna was delivered to her owners on 16 March 2009. She was christened on 4 April 2009, at Palma de Mallorca by the German supermodel, Franziska Knuppe.

== Description ==
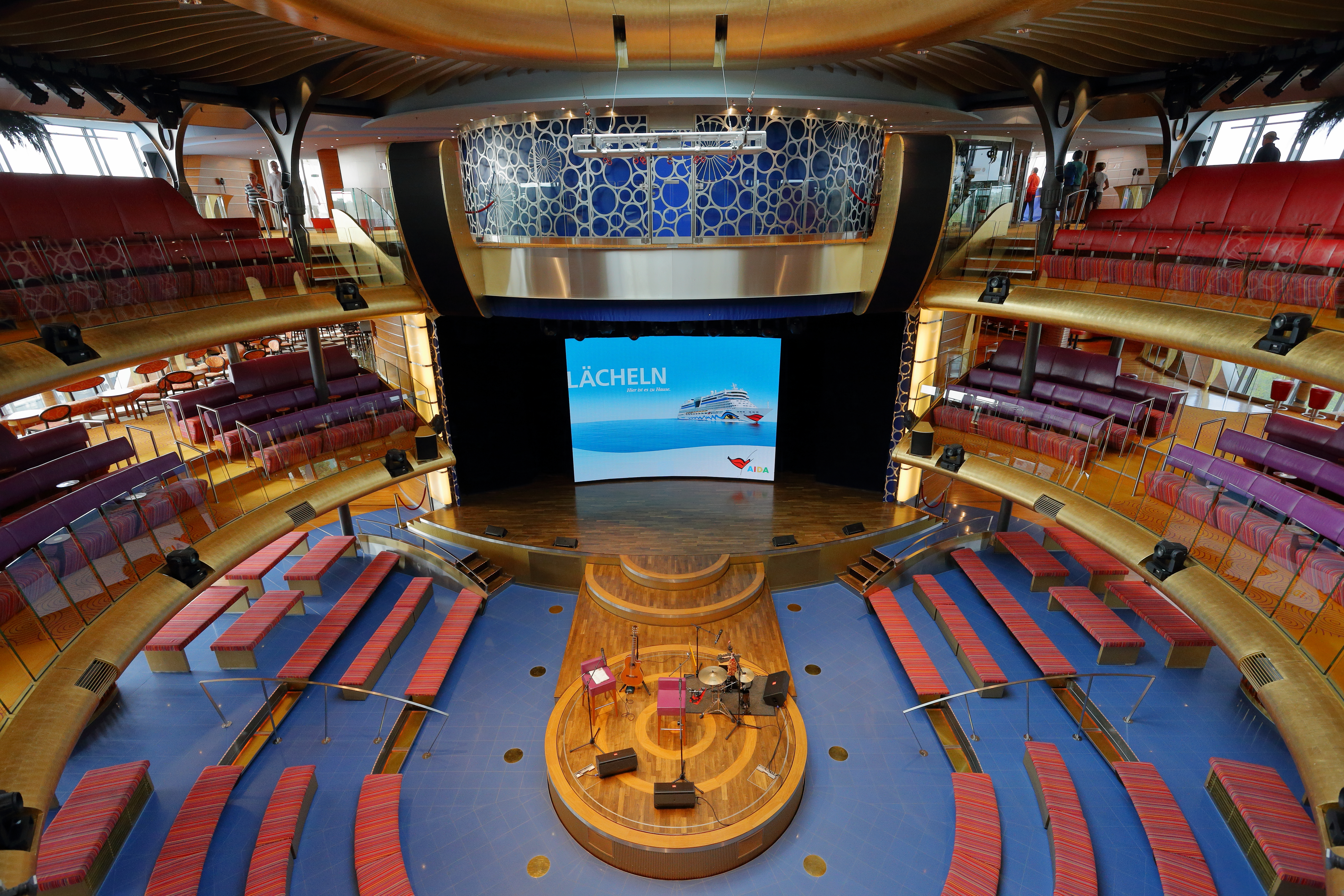
AIDAluna Theatrium

AIDAluna measures 251.89 metres (826 ft 5 in) long overall and 225.55 m (740 ft 0 in) between perpendiculars with a beam of 32.2 m (105 ft 8 in) and a draught of 7.3 m (23 ft 11 in). The ship is assessed at 69,203 gross tonnage (GT), 42,705 net tonnage (NT) and 8,654 tons deadweight (DWT). The ship is powered by a diesel-electric system consisting of Caterpillar MaK 9M43C diesel engines capable of producing 36,000 kW (48,000 hp) of power turning two propellers, creating 25,000 kilowatts (34,000 hp) and giving the ship a maximum speed of 22 knots (41 km/h; 25 mph). The vessel has a crew of 607.

The cruise ship has 13 decks and 1,025 passenger cabins, with 666 facing the exterior and 359 interior-facing. AIDAluna is capable of hosting 2,050 passengers. AIDAluna has a 2,300-square-metre (25,000 sq ft) spa facility and 6,400 m^{2} (69,000 sq ft) sun deck. The ship has seven restaurants and 11 bars. The focal point in the ship is the Theatrium, a three-level complex, which could be transformed into a theatre. An onboard 4-D cinema is fitted with moving chairs.

== Operational history ==
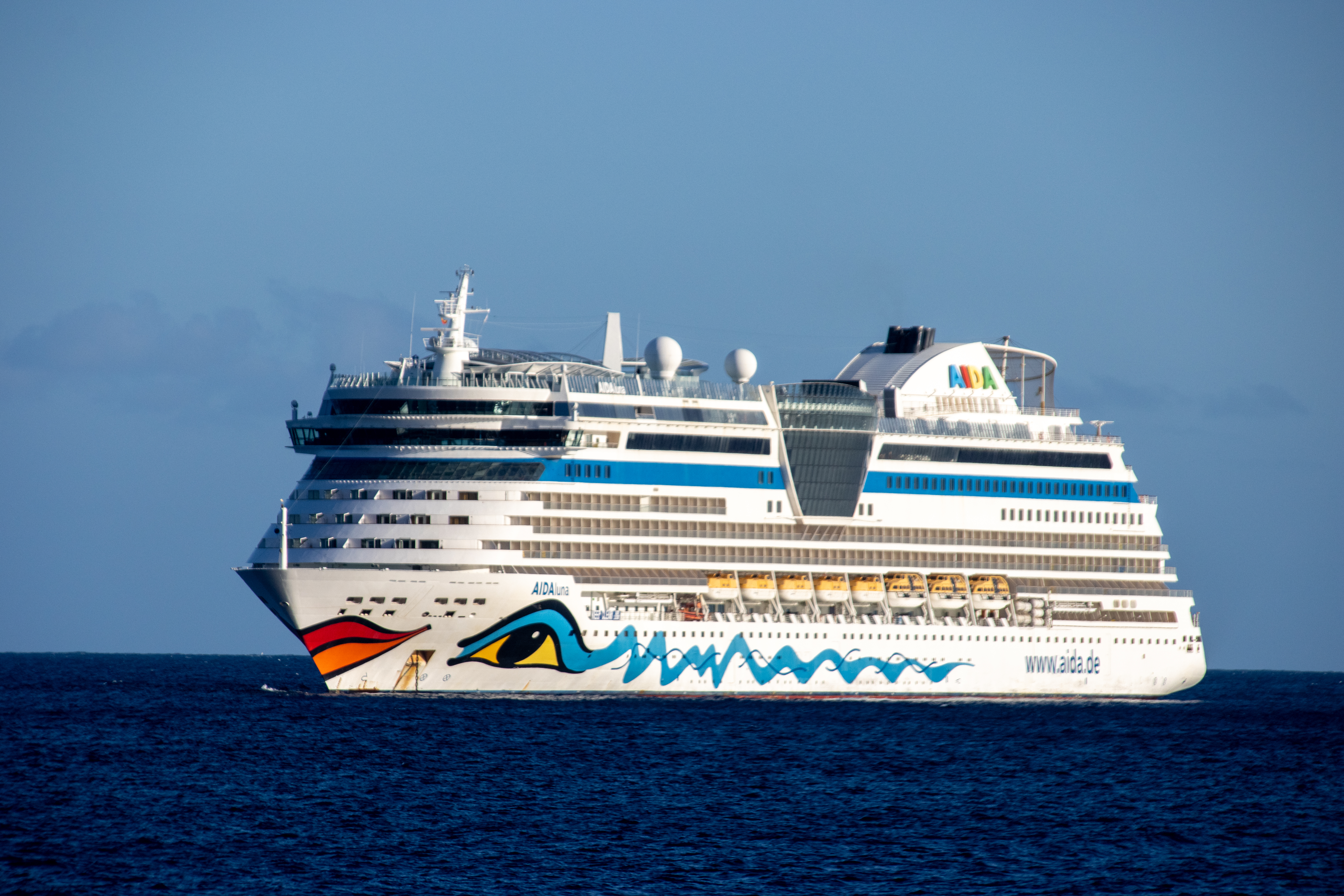
At Tenerife in May 2021

AIDAluna started her maiden voyage on 22 March 2009, departing Hamburg. This 14-day voyage culminated in Palma de Mallorca, with stops at Le Havre, Santander, A Coruña, Lisbon, Cádiz, Tangier, Valencia, and Barcelona. In Summer 2009, she was deployed in Baltic Sea and in Winter, she was redeployed in Canary Islands. AIDAluna made her first call in Kiel on 22 April and in Rostock-Warnemünde on 8 May, departing from Palma de Mallorca. She made ten roundtrip cruises in the Baltic during the 2009 Summer season. In 2011, AIDAluna was redeployed in the Caribbean and offered 14-day cruises, with additional 6 to 8-day sailings. On her way to the Caribbean, AIDAluna sailed the United States East Coast, calling at New York City. AIDAluna made the first visit to Bermuda by an AIDA Cruises' ship in September 2011. In April 2014, the ship had a scrubber system installed to reduce its emissions.

At around 5 a.m. on 9 September 2018, the German pop singer Daniel Küblböck jumped overboard when the vessel was in open waters about 185 km (115 mi) north of St. John's, Newfoundland and Labrador in the Labrador Sea. The Canadian Coast Guard launched a search operation, assisted by AIDAluna and the Holland America cruise ship Zuiderdam. The search was abandoned the following day, as the water temperature was 10 °C (50 °F) and the maximum survival time in cold water had been exceeded, and Küblböck was later officially declared dead.

During the COVID-19 pandemic, AIDA Cruises suspended all cruises in March 2020, only resuming operations after clearance from local governments. The ship was the seventh and last of the AIDA cruises fleet to resume operations, sailing in September 2021. During the Winter season of 2024–2025, AIDAluna serviced the Caribbean, departing from Martinique and visiting the Caribbean islands, Mexico, Central America and a single stop in Colombia at Santa Marta. In October 2025, the ship entered dry dock to undergo the "Evolution" refit, in which the ship will get new features and an interior overhaul. The vessel returned to service in December 2025.
