= AIDAblu =

Cruise ship built in 2010

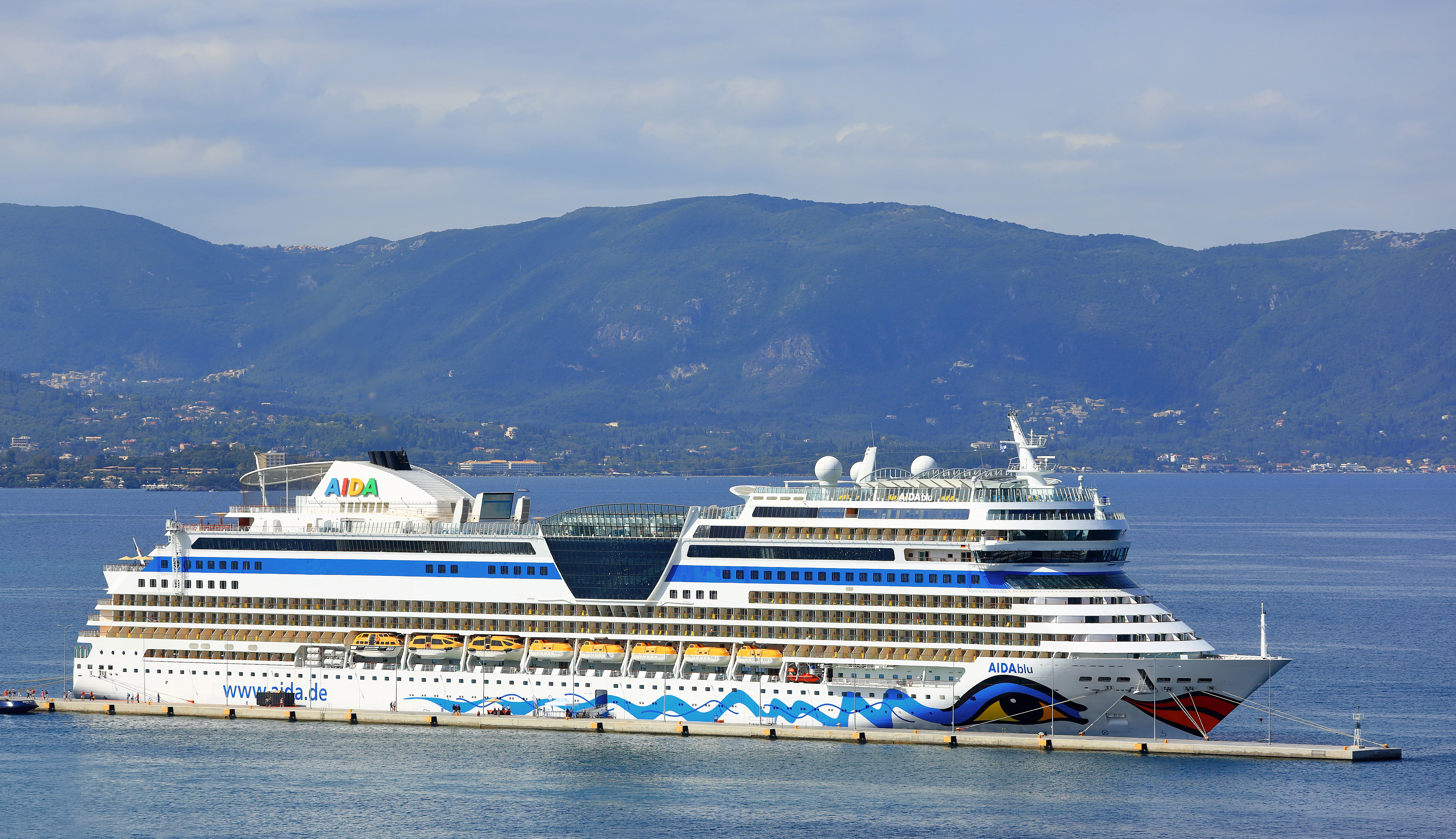
- AIDAblu in Corfu

History

Italy
- Name: AIDAblu
- Owner: Costa Crociere S.p.A.
- Operator: AIDA Cruises
- Port of registry: Genoa, Italy
- Ordered: July 1, 2006
- Builder: Meyer Werft (Germany)
- Cost: $420 million
- Yard number: S. 680
- Launched: July 11, 2009
- Christened: February 9, 2010
- Maiden voyage: February 9, 2010 to Palma, Majorca
- In service: 2010–present
- Identification: Call sign: IBWX; IMO number: 9398888; MMSI number: 247282500
- Status: In service

General characteristics
- Class & type: Sphinx-class cruise ship
- Tonnage: 71,304 GT
- Length: 253.33 m (831.14 ft)
- Beam: 32.2 m (105.64 ft)
- Draught: 7.3 m (23.95 ft)
- Decks: 15 decks
- Installed power: Diesel-electric (about 36,000kW)
- Propulsion: 4 Caterpillar MaK engines
- Capacity: 2,192 passengers
- Crew: 607 crew

AIDAblu is a Sphinx-class cruise ship, operated by the German cruise line AIDA Cruises. AIDAblu is the seventh ship in the cruise line. The vessel was delivered by Meyer Werft on 4 February 2010. She is a sister ship to AIDAdiva, AIDAbella, AIDAluna with a half deck more, and is followed by similar AIDAsol and AIDAmar. She has a passenger capacity of 2,050.

The name of AIDAblu was used for a former AIDA ship from 2004 to 2007.

== Facilities ==
AIDAblu has six restaurants, ten bars, 8,120 square metres (87,000 sq ft) of outer deck area and 3,000 square metres (32,000 sq ft) theatrium.

It also has the first brewery installed on a cruise ship, where the beers served in the ship are brewed.

AIDAblu has 1096 cabins, 374 on the inside and 722 on the outside. The callsign is IBWX . IMO 9398888 . MMSI 247282500.

== Incidents ==
In 2010 Francesco Schettino, the captain of the ill-fated Costa Concordia before, was the captain of the Costa Atlantica, also a Carnival Corporation ship as it entered the port of Warnemünde, Germany, at too high a speed, allegedly causing damage to the AIDAblu.

On 18 May 2020, whilst the ship was docked in Hamburg, a male Filipino crew member of AIDAblu who had worked in the galley department was found dead in his cabin. The crew member was not suspected to have died of COVID-19.
