= Corvus Energy =

Energy storage company

Corvus energy
- Industry: Energy storage systems
- Founded: 2009 in Vancouver, Canada.
- Headquarters: Norway
- Area served: Worldwide
- Website: https://corvusenergy.com/

Corvus Energy is a company specializing in Energy Storage Systems (ESS) for maritime applications.

Established in Canada in 2009, the company relocated its headquarters to Norway in 2018. Corvus Energy provides modular lithium-ion battery systems designed to power hybrid and all-electric heavy industrial equipment, including large marine propulsion drives.

The company also develops maritime fuel cells in collaboration with Toyota. Corvus Energy operates manufacturing and engineering facilities in Porsgrunn and Bergen, Norway, as well as in Richmond, British Columbia, Canada. In January 2023, Corvus inaugurated a maritime battery manufacturing plant in Fairhaven, Washington, United States.

Corvus Energy supports a global sales and service network.
