= AIDAperla =

Cruise ship

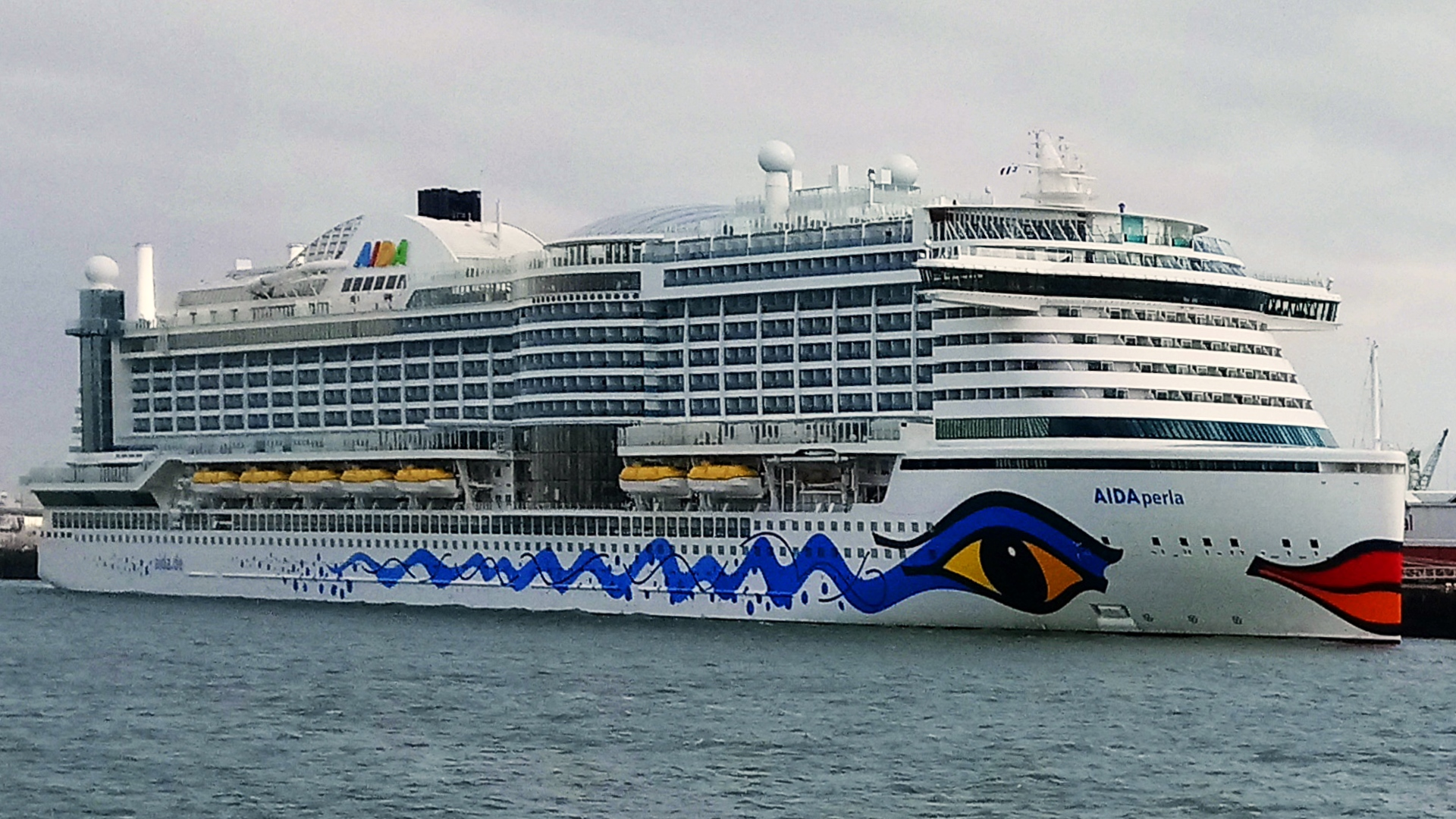
- AIDAperla at Le Havre

History

Italy
- Owner: AIDA Cruises
- Port of registry: Genoa, Italy
- Ordered: 2 November 2011
- Builder: Mitsubishi Heavy Industries
- Yard number: 2301
- Laid down: 14 December 2012
- Launched: 20 March 2016
- Completed: 27 April 2017
- Identification: Call sign: IBRL; IMO number: 9636967; MMSI number: 247385300
- Status: In service
- Notes: Type Hyperion-class Cruise ship

General characteristics
- Type: Cruise ship
- Tonnage: 125,572 GT; 9,700 DWT
- Length: 300.00 m (984.25 ft)
- Beam: 37.00 m (121.39 ft)
- Draught: 8.25 m (27.1 ft)
- Decks: 18
- Installed power: Caterpillar 12VM43C diesel units (38,100 hp)
- Propulsion: 2 x ABB Azipod thrusters
- Speed: 22.5 knots (42 km/h) (cruising)
- Capacity: 4,350 passengers
- Crew: 900

AIDAperla is a cruise ship of AIDA Cruises, which was built by Mitsubishi Shipbuilding at their shipyard in Nagasaki, Japan. The vessel was delivered in May 2017 and was formally named in June 2017 by its godmother, German fashion model and television host Lena Gercke.

== Design ==
AIDAperla has overall length of 300.00 m (984.25 ft), moulded beam of 37.00 m (121.39 ft), and maximum draft of 8.25 m (27.1 ft). The vessel has deadweight of 9,200 DWT and gross tonnage of 125,572 GT. The cruise ship has 1,643 cabins and capacity for 3,286 passengers in double occupancy. AIDAperla has 16 passenger decks out of a total of 18 decks.

== Engineering ==
The cruise ship AIDAperla is driven by three Caterpillar 12VM43C diesel units, each with a power of 12,670 hp (9,450 kW). Additionally the ship has one dual-fuel Caterpillar 12VM46DF with a power of 11,650 hp (8,690 kW) and a generator Caterpillar 3516B with a power of 3,020 hp (2,250 kW). The cruise ship has a service speed of 22.5 kn (41.7 km/h; 25.9 mph).

== Accidents and incidents ==
While en route from Hamburg to La Coruña, a crew member was reported missing, believed overboard, off Ramsgate on 22 October 2023. A 9-hour search by HM Coastguard helicopter and the RNLI assisted by the AIDAperla which had returned to the area the person was thought to have gone missing, failed to find them and the search was called off.
