= Solvang (company) =

Norwegian shipping company

Solvang ASA
- Industry: Shipping
- Founded: 1936
- Headquarters: Stavanger, Norway
- Area served: Global
- Key people: Edvin Endresen (CEO)
- Revenue: ▲NOK 149.4 million (2005)
- Operating income: NOK 52.6 million (2005)
- Website: www.solvangship.no

Solvang is a Norwegian shipping company that operates twenty three vessels, including LPG and LPG/ethylene carriers. The company was founded in 1936 and is based in Stavanger.
