= AIDAbella =

Cruise ship

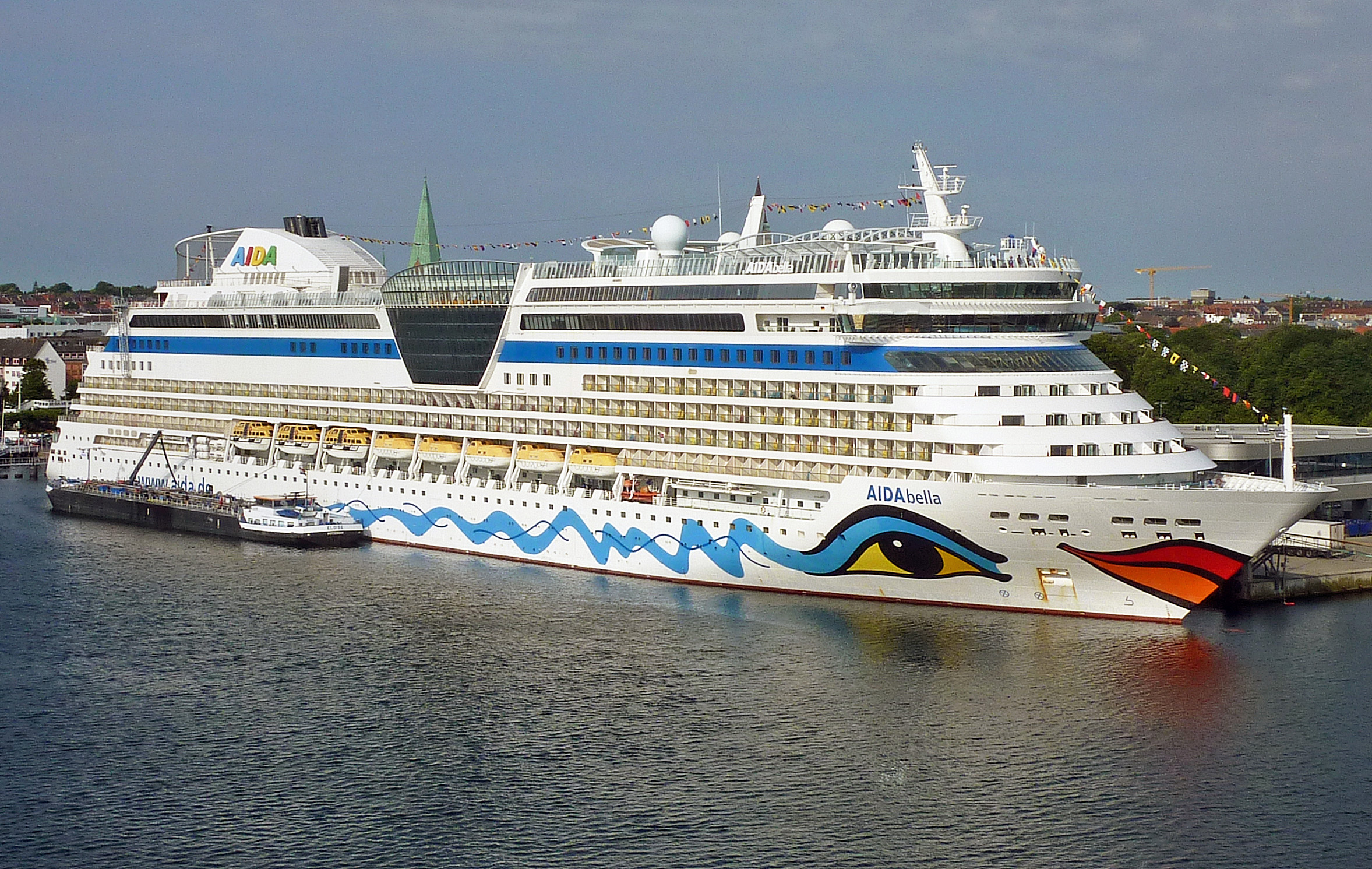
- AIDAbella in Kiel, 2022

History

Italy
- Name: AIDAbella
- Operator: AIDA Cruises
- Port of registry: Genoa, Italy
- Ordered: 1 August 2005
- Builder: Meyer Werft (Papenburg)
- Cost: $390 million
- Yard number: S.666
- Laid down: March 10, 2007
- Launched: October 19, 2007
- Christened: April 23, 2008 in Warnemünde by Eva Padberg
- In service: 2008–present
- Identification: IMO number: 9362542; Call Sign ICGS; MMSI 247229700
- Status: In service

General characteristics
- Class & type: Sphinx-class cruise ship
- Type: Cruise ship
- Tonnage: 69,203 GT
- Length: 251.89 m (826.41 ft)
- Beam: 32.2 m (105.64 ft) (waterline); 37.6 m (123.36 ft) (max)
- Height: 61 m (200 ft)
- Draught: 7.3 m (23.95 ft)
- Depth: 9.6 m (31.50 ft)
- Decks: 14
- Installed power: 4 × Cat MaK 9M43C; (total power 36,000 kW (48,000 hp))
- Propulsion: diesel-electric; two shafts
- Speed: 19.5 knots (36.1 km/h; 22.4 mph) (service); 21.8 knots (40.4 km/h; 25.1 mph) (maximum)
- Capacity: 2,500 passengers
- Crew: 646

AIDAbella is a cruise ship operated by AIDA Cruises. Built at Meyer Werft shipyard in Papenburg, Germany, she is a sister ship to AIDAdiva and AIDAluna. The ship has a passenger capacity of over 2,050. The name AIDAbella was chosen after a competition to name the new ship. The name was meant to signify how beautiful the ship is.

== Facilities ==
The ship has 1,025 passenger cabins. There is a nude sunbathing area towards the rear of the ship. Amidships is a circular, glass-walled, and roofed Theatrium in the center of the ship.

AIDAbella in Las Palmas, Canary Islands
