= AIDAdiva =

Cruise ship built in 2007

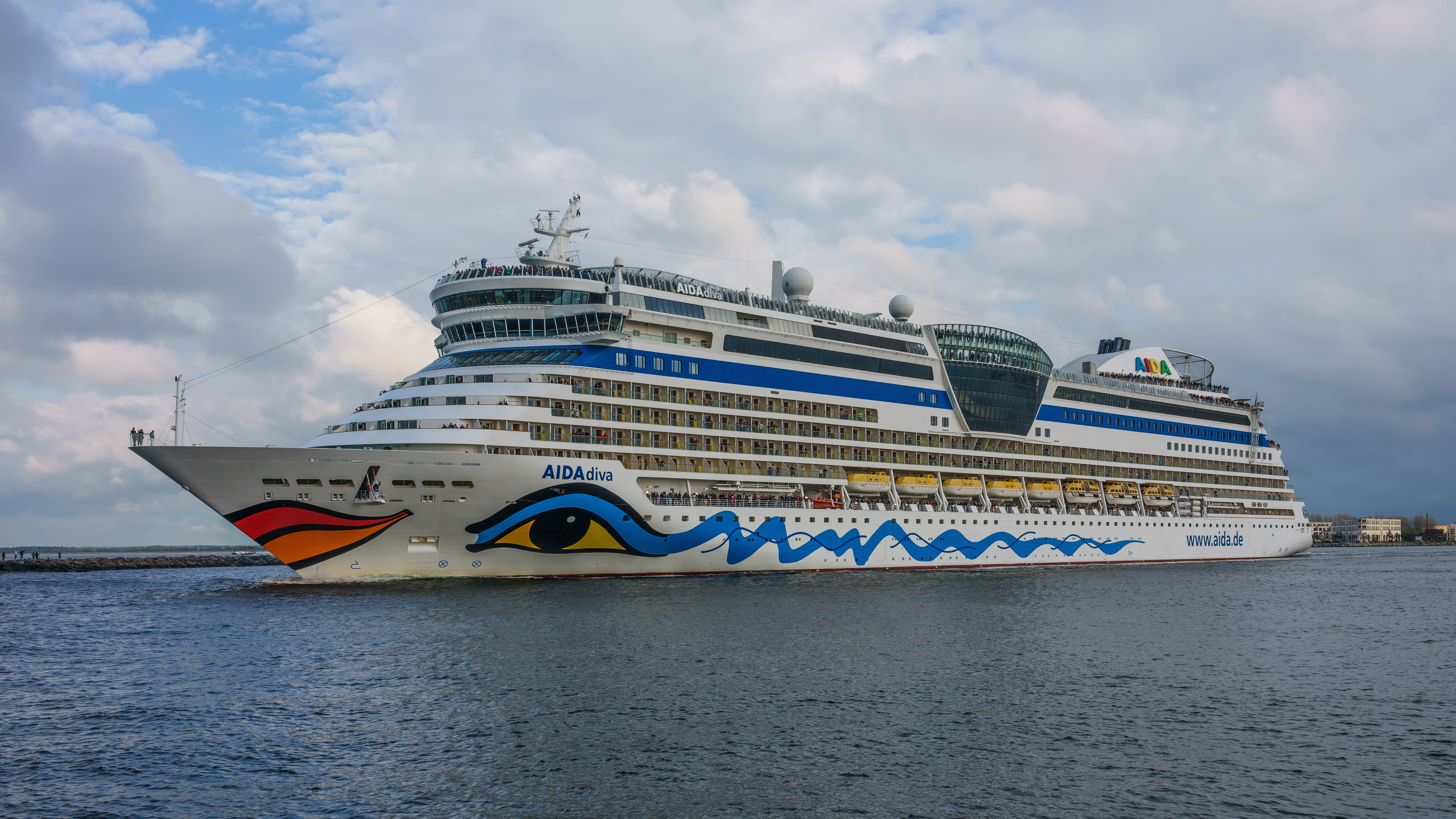
- AIDAdiva in Warnemünde

History

Italy
- Name: AIDAdiva
- Owner: 2007-2023: Costa Crociere; 2023–present Carnival Corporation & plc
- Operator: AIDA Cruises
- Port of registry: Genoa, Italy
- Builder: Meyer Werft
- Yard number: 659
- Laid down: 3 March 2006
- Launched: 4 March 2007
- Christened: 20 April 2007
- In service: 2007–present
- Identification: Call sign: ICDH; IMO number: 9334856; MMSI number: 247187700
- Status: In service

General characteristics
- Class & type: Sphinx-class cruise ship cruise ship
- Tonnage: 69,203 GT
- Length: 251.89 m (826.41 ft)
- Beam: 32.2 m (105.64 ft) (waterline); 37.6 m (123.36 ft) (max)
- Height: 61 m (200 ft)
- Draught: 7.3 m (23.95 ft)
- Depth: 9.3 m (30.51 ft)
- Decks: 14
- Installed power: 4 × Cat MaK 9M43C; (total power 36,000 kW (48,000 hp))
- Speed: 21.8 knots (40.4 km/h; 25.1 mph)
- Capacity: 2,050 passengers
- Crew: 646

AIDAdiva is a Sphinx-class cruise ship operated by the German cruise line AIDA Cruises. The ship was built at Meyer Werft in Papenburg, Germany.
