= Meyer Werft =

German shipbuilder

Coordinates: 53°05′55″N 7°21′59″E

Meyer Werft GmbH & Co. KG

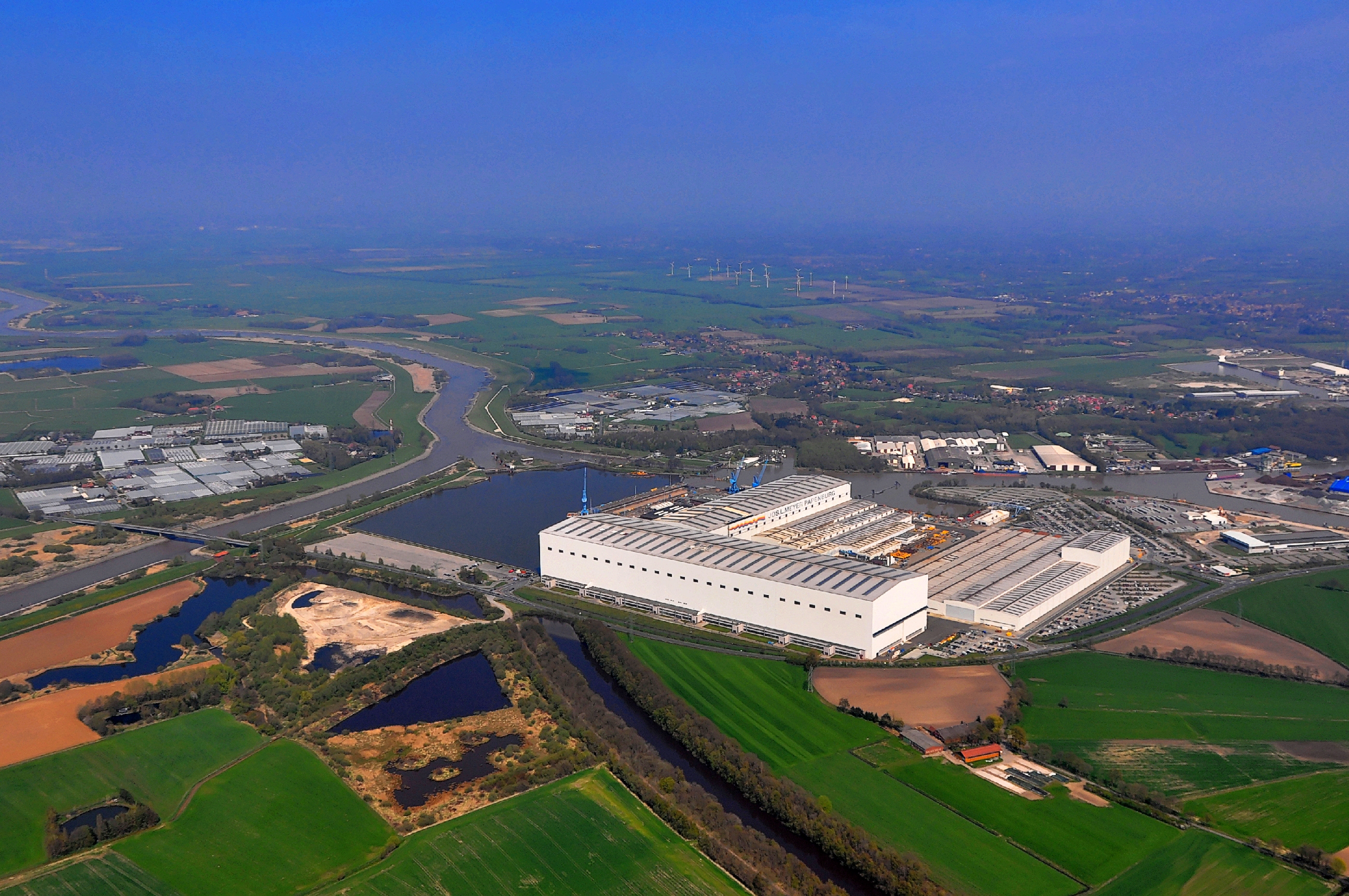
- Meyer Werft shipyard in Papenburg
- Type: Private
- Industry: Shipbuilding
- Founded: 1795
- Founder: Willm Rolf Meyer
- Headquarters: Papenburg, Germany
- Key people: André Walter (CEO)
- Revenue: ▲€51 million (2018); ▲€17 million (2019); ▼€70 million (2020); ▲€2.1 billion (2022)
- Owner: Federal Government of Germany (40%); Lower Saxony (40%); Meyer family (20%)
- Number of employees: 7,000 (2024)
- Subsidiaries: Neptun Werft
- Website: meyerwerft.com

Meyer Werft (pronounced [ˈmaɪɐ ˈvɛʁft]; lit. 'Meyer Shipyard') is a German shipbuilding company, headquartered in Papenburg at the river Ems. It was founded in 1795, as a builder of small wooden vessels. It was owned and managed by the Meyer family for seven generations until September 2024, when the German federal government and the state of Lower Saxony acquired an 80% majority stake, leaving the Meyer family with just under 20%. Since 1997, it has been part of the Meyer Neptun Group, together with Neptun Werft in Rostock. In 2014, the company added the Turku shipyard in Finland to the group. Since then, it has also been a builder of luxury passenger ships. 700 ships of different types had been built at the yard. The Dock 2 Hall is the third largest shipbuilding hall and the fifth-largest usable volume in the world as of 2022. The shipyard is an anchor on the European Route of Industrial Heritage.

== History ==
The shipyard was founded at the beginning of 1795 by Willm Rolf Meyer as a yard specializing in small wooden vessels. Josef Lambert Meyer began building iron vessels in 1874.

During the Second World War, Meyer Werft mainly repaired ships, including ships from the Kriegsmarine.

There were once more than 20 shipyards in the Papenburg area, but today Meyer Werft is the only one remaining.

Meyer Werft gained international recognition through the construction of roll-on/roll-off ferries, passenger ferries, gasoline tankers, container ships, livestock ferries and most recently luxury cruise ships.

Meyer is one of the largest and most modern shipyards in the world with about 3300 employees, and home to the largest roofed dry docks in the world. The first covered dock was inaugurated in 1987 and was 370 meters long, 101,5 meters wide and 60 meters high. In 1990/91 the dock was extended by an additional 100 meters. In 2004, a second covered dock was built, which is announced to be extended to a full-length of 504 meters, a width of 125 meters and height of 75 meters in order to compete with Asian shipyards. Meyer Werft will as a result of this be able to build three cruise ships a year. Because the yard at Papenburg is upstream on the river Ems, the giant ships to be delivered have to make a 36 km voyage to the Dollart bay. These voyages attract thousands of spectators. Up until the completion of the Ems river barrier in 2002, the journey was only possible at high tides.

In September 2014 Meyer Werft acquired 70% ownership of STX Finland and the Turku shipyard STX Finland Oy from STX Europe with the state-owned Finnish Industry Investment owning the remaining 30%. The shipyard was renamed Meyer Turku Oy. Meyer Werft acquired the remaining 30% in 2015.

During the COVID-19 pandemic, Meyer Werft ran into financial trouble due to a rise in energy and material costs for their shipbuilding contracts. In 2024, Meyer Werft needed €2.8 billion to complete its existing orders but were unable to obtain financing from banks. The German state and the States of Germany were asked to support the struggling shipyard. Chancellor Olaf Scholz proclaimed the systemic relevance of Meyer Werft in mid August 2024 and signaled the readiness to help out, pending approval by the Bundestag and the European Commission. On 13 September 2024, the German parliaments budgetary committee voted for the governments rescue plan. Research by Handelsblatt showed that the Federal Ministry of Finance had addressed the committee in a secret dossier and stressed the potential importance of the shipyard for military projects if global tensions should rise. However, Max Johns, Professor for Maritime Management with the HSBA called the claim of Meyer Werft's importance for military projects a "retroactive search for reasons" after politicians had already promised to help, and that ThyssenKrupp Marine Systems and Lürssen were already available. The contracts were signed on 16 September 2024, with the German government acquiring 80% of the company for €400 million. A week after the signing, systemic malpractices in management accounting were discovered, with the management apparently unaware of the actual state of Meyer Werft projects and never having produced monthly financial statements.

=== Government 80% ownership (2024) ===
A report from summer 2024 confirmed that Meyer Werft had a positive restructuring perspective. The shipyard needed fresh capital by September 15, 2024. There is no private investor in sight. That's why the state and federal government decided to support the cash-strapped shipyard. On one hand, a guarantee worth at least two billion euros was needed, half of which was provided by the federal and state governments. On the other hand, Meyer Werft needed fresh equity capital. A 400 million euros contribution was debated. This meant that the state would take over the clear majority of the shipyard. The government of the state of Lower Saxony and the Scholz government signed contracts on September 16, 2024, by which the Federal Republic and the state of Lower Saxony took over around 80% of Meyer Werft; the Meyer family holds just under 20% of the shares and appoints one representative to the supervisory board.

In addition to the economic importance, the potential military importance also became known as a justification for the state's entry. A report from EY-Parthenon confirms that the Papenburg shipyard location, with its existing infrastructure, is suitable and has capacity to build naval ships if necessary. Papenburg is out of range of Russian short-range missiles in Kaliningrad Oblast. Security expert Sebastian Bruns said that the Ems barrage, needed by Meyer Werft to transport the ships it builds, also needs to be protected.

== Ships built at Meyer Werft ==
A large variety of ships have been built at Meyer Werft, including car carriers, cargo ships, container ships, cruise ships, ferries, fishing vessels, gas carriers, lightvessels, paddlesteamers, passenger ships and Seebäderschiffs. During the last years, the shipyard was only building cruise ships. Since 2024, the company is building parts of Converter Platform. The decision was made during the beginning of the COVID-19 pandemic.

Future projects
Delivery	Name	Gross tonnage	Owner	Hall	Notes
2024‍–‍2027	?	—	Amprion	—	4 × steel platforms for offshore converters, built in partnership with Dragados Offshore and Siemens Energy.
2026	Njord	84,800	Ocean Residences Development	1	Residences, 1,000 passengers, Methane fueled
2026	Meteor IV	10,000	German Federal Ministry of Research, Technology and Space	1	Research vessel, built in partnership with Fassmer
2027	Carnival Festivale (Excel-class)	180,000	Carnival Cruise Line	2	Cruise ship
2027	Disney Believe (Wish-class)	144,000	Disney Cruise Line	2	Cruise ship, 1,250 cabins, LNG fueled
2028	Carnival Tropicale (Excel-class)	180,000	Carnival Cruise Line	2	Cruise ship
2029	Disney Imagination (Wish-class)	144,000	Disney Cruise Line (Oriental Land Co.)	2	Cruise ship, 1,250 cabins, LNG fueled
2029	N.N.	100,000	Disney Cruise Line		Cruise ship, 3,000 passengers
2030	N.N.	100,000	Disney Cruise Line		Cruise ship, 3,000 passengers
2030	N.N. (New Frontier-class)	180,000	MSC Cruises		Cruise ship, 5,400 passengers
2031	N.N.	100,000	Disney Cruise Line		Cruise ship, 3,000 passengers
2031	N.N. (New Frontier-class)	180,000	MSC Cruises		Cruise ship, 5,400 passengers
2032	N.N. (New Frontier-class)	180,000	MSC Cruises		Cruise ship, 5,400 passengers
2033	N.N. (New Frontier-class)	180,000	MSC Cruises		Cruise ship, 5,400 passengers

== List of shipyards ==
- Meyer Werft (located in Papenburg, Germany)
- Neptun Werft (located in Rostock, Germany)
- Meyer Turku (located in Turku, Finland)
