= List of largest cruise ships =

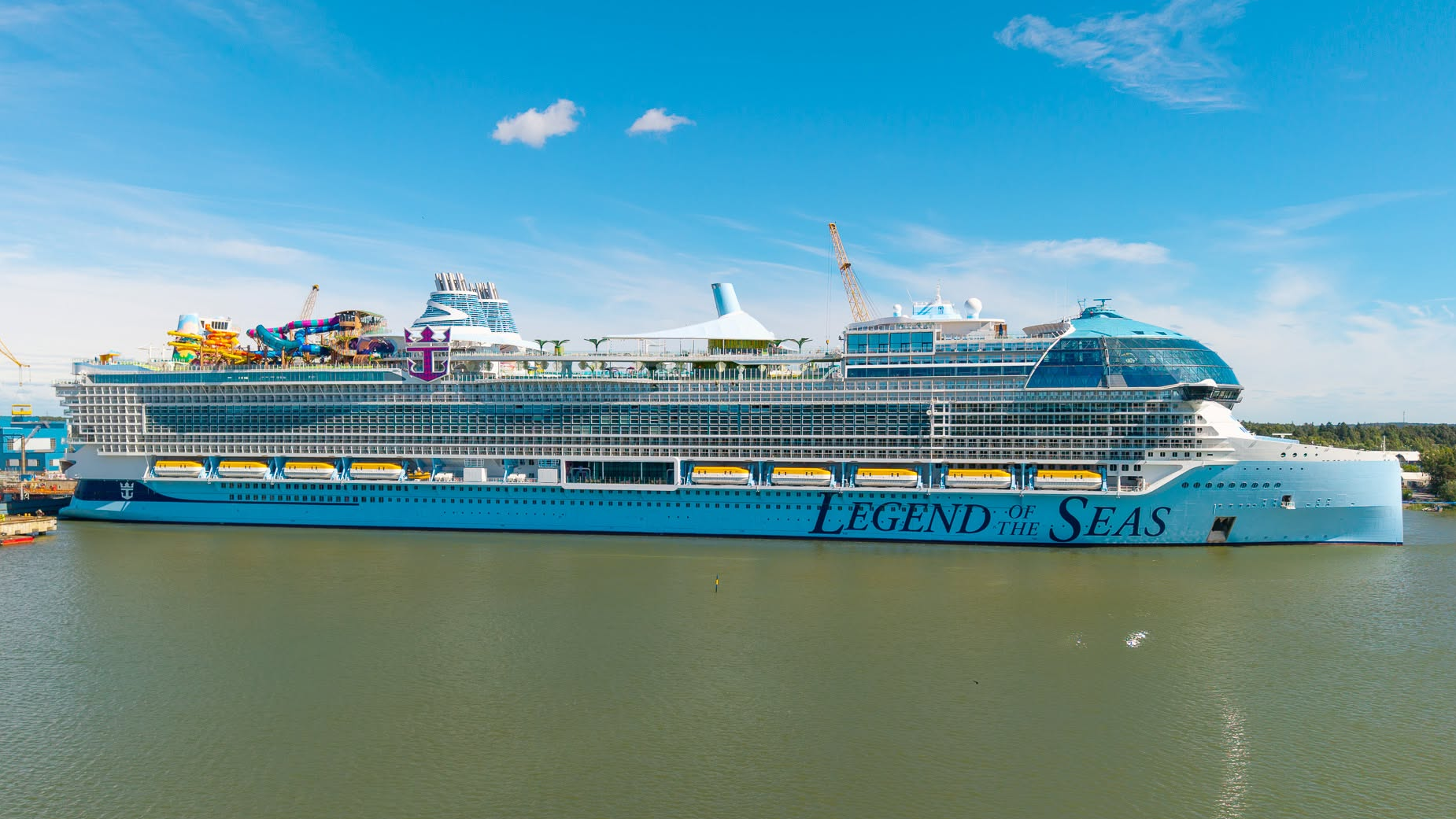
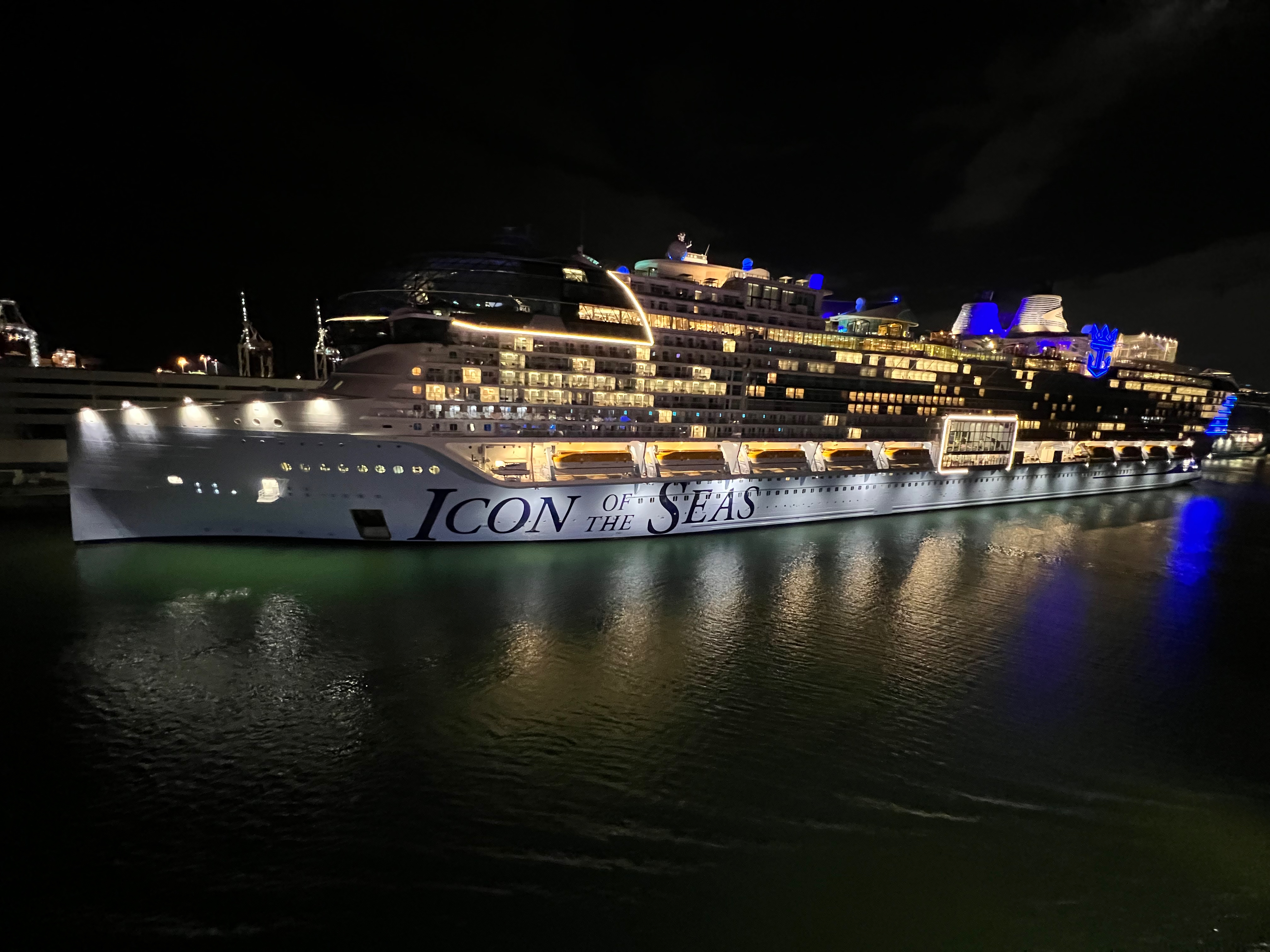
Legend of the Seas (left), Star of the Seas (center) and Icon of the Seas (right), the three Royal Caribbean International Icon class cruise ships tied for largest in the world.

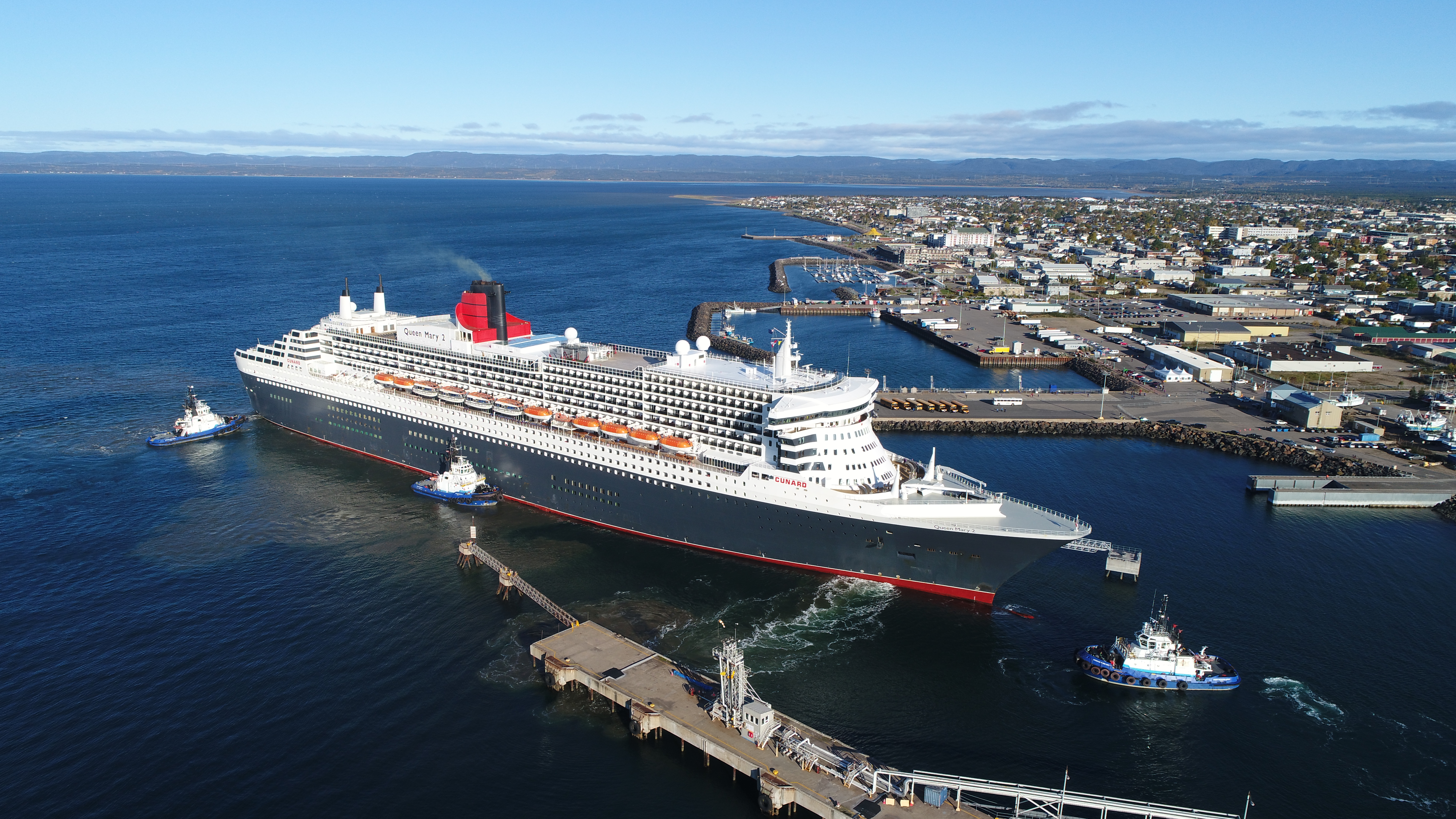
Cunard's Queen Mary 2, which held the record of largest ship from 2004–2006, was the last non-Royal Caribbean ship to do so.

Cruise ships are large passenger ships used mainly for vacationing. Unlike ocean liners which are primarily used for transportation across seas or oceans, cruise ships typically embark on round-trip voyages to various attractive ports of call. Their passengers may go on organized tours known as "shore excursions". The largest may carry thousands of passengers in a single trip, and are some of the largest ships in the world by gross tonnage (GT), bigger than many large cargo ships. Cruise ships started to exceed ocean liners in size and capacity in the mid-1990s; before then, few were more than 50,000 GT. In the decades since, the size of the largest vessels has more than doubled.

There have been nine or more new cruise ships added every year since 2001, most of which are 100,000 GT or greater. In the two decades between 1988 and 2009, the largest cruise ships grew a third longer (268 to 360 m (879 to 1,181 ft)), almost doubled their widths (32.2 to 60.5 m (106 to 198 ft)), doubled the total passengers (2,744 to 5,400), and tripled in volume (73,000 GT to 225,000 GT). The largest have grown considerably since, particularly in passenger capacity; As of December 2023, the largest cruise ship, Icon of the Seas, has a gross tonnage of 248,336, is 365 m (1,198 ft) long and holds up to 7,600 passengers.

Cruise ships are organized much like floating hotels, with a complete hospitality staff in addition to the usual ship's crew. They cater to nautical tourists, with recent vessels being described as "balcony-laden floating condominiums". The "megaships" went from a single deck with verandas to all decks with verandas, and feature amenities such as theaters, fine-dining and chain restaurants, spas, fitness centers, casinos, sports facilities, and even amusement park attractions.

Cruise ships require electricity both for propulsion and onboard power. As with cargo ships, cruise vessels are designed with all the heavy machinery at the bottom of the hull and lightweight materials where feasible at the top, making them inherently stable even as passenger ships are getting ever taller, and most supplement design with stabilizer fins to further reduce rolling in heavy weather. While some cruise ships use traditional fixed propellers and rudders to steer, most larger ships use azimuth thrusters that can swivel left and right to steer, vastly improving vessel maneuverability.

Cruise ships are operated by cruise lines, which offer cruises to the public. In the 1990s, many cruise lines were bought by much larger holding companies and continue to operate as brands or subsidiaries of the holding company. For instance, Carnival Corporation & plc owns both the mass-market Carnival Cruise Line, focused on larger party ships for younger travelers, and Holland America Line, whose smaller ships cultivate an image of classic elegance.

== Timeline ==
The first large cruise ships were the Destiny-class from Carnival Cruise Line. The lead ship Carnival Destiny was the first to exceed 100,000 gross tons and the first to eclipse RMS Queen Elizabeth in terms of tonnage.

Grand Princess eclipsed Carnival Destiny in 1998.

The Voyager-class from Royal Caribbean Group's Royal Caribbean International (RCI) debuted in 1998 and at over 137,000 GT, were almost 30,000 GT larger than the next-largest cruise ships, and were some of the first designed to offer amenities such as an ice rink and climbing wall.

In 2004, the five Voyager-class ships were overtaken by the 148,528 GT Queen Mary 2 (QM2), the only ocean liner currently in service.

QM2 was surpassed by RCI's 155,889 GT Freedom-class vessels in 2006, which were in turn overtaken by RCI's first of six planned Oasis-class vessels in 2009. The Oasis-class ships, at over 225,000 GT, at least 154 feet (47 m) wide, 240 feet (73 m) high, and 1,180 feet (360m) long, can accommodate over 5,400 passengers. Oasis-class ships were surpassed by the first Icon-class ship, Icon of the Seas, at 248,663 GT in 2023.

Since 2008, other cruise lines have been ordering 135,000+ GT ships. MSC Cruises introduced the first of four 137,936–139,072 GT Fantasia-class cruise ships in 2008, followed in 2017 by both the 153,516 GT Seaside-class and the 171,598–181,541 GT Meraviglia class. Norwegian Cruise Line debuted the 155,873 GT Norwegian Epic in 2010, the first ship outside of the Oasis class with a double-occupancy capacity of over 4,000, Princess Cruises and P&O Cruises, debuted the first of seven 142,714 GT+ Royal-class ships in 2013, and the corporation's Carnival Cruise Line, Costa Cruises, and AIDA Cruises debuted the first of seven planned 133,596–135,225 GT Vista-class ships in 2016. AIDAnova, the first of Carnival Corporation's nine planned Excellence-class ships, debuted in 2018 at 183,858 GT, with future ships in the class planned for Costa, P&O, Carnival, and AIDA. In 2016 and 2017, Genting Hong Kong's Dream Cruises introduced the 150,695 GT Genting Dream and World Dream, the first large ships from an Asian-owned cruise line.

Asia-based Dream Cruises, which went bankrupt due to the COVID-19 pandemic, had been planning to take delivery of two 208,000 GT Global-class ships in 2021 and 2022, which would have been the first ships over 200,000 GT not built for RCI, with the largest maximum passenger capacity, 9,500, of any ship. One unfinished ship, formerly the Global Dream, was sold to Disney Cruise Line and debuted in March 2026 as the Disney Adventure, while the other was sent for scrapping.

== In service ==
As of June 2026, there are 68 passenger ships with over 140,000 GT in service.

Largest cruise ships in service
Rank (Note: Ships are ranked by gross tonnage and subsequently by the date they entered service.)	Ship name	Ship class	Cruise line (Note: The cruise line that currently operates the ship, which in some cases may be different than the line that ordered the ship or from the holding company that technically owns it)	Year (Note: The year the ship originally entered service, which in some cases may not be the year it started service under the listed cruise line or with the listed name)	Gross tonnage (Note: Ship dimensions are sourced from the appropriate classification society whenever possible.)	Length overall (Note: Some classification societies, such as Registro Italiano Navale only list length between perpendiculars, not length overall, in which case length data is provided by other sources.)	Beam		Staterooms	Passenger capacity (Note: Passenger capacity excludes crew.)		Image							
Rank	Ship name	Ship class	Cruise line	Year	Gross tonnage	Length overall	Maximum (Note: Width at the widest point anywhere on the ship's height)	Waterline (Note: Width at the widest point as measured at the ship's nominal waterline)	Staterooms	Double (Note: Where official sources do not specify double occupancy capacity or lower berths capacity, this list assumes two passengers per stateroom (some ships have small rooms that only count as a single passenger when calculating double-occupancy).)	Maximum (Note: Maximum capacity of the ship, usually determined by total number of beds and/or SOLAS safety standards)	Image							
1	Icon of the Seas	Icon class	Royal Caribbean International	2024	248,663	364.75 m (1,196.7 ft)	66 m (217 ft)	48.47 m (159.0 ft)	2,805	5,610	7,600								
1	Star of the Seas	Icon class	Royal Caribbean International	2025	248,663	364.83 m (1,196.9 ft)	66 m (217 ft)	48.48 m (159.1 ft)	2,805	5,610	7,600								
1	Legend of the Seas	Icon class	Royal Caribbean International	2026	248,663	364.84 m (1,197.0 ft)	66 m (217 ft)	48.49 m (159.1 ft)	2,805	5,610	7,600								
4	Utopia of the Seas	Oasis class	Royal Caribbean International	2024	236,473	361.12 m (1,184.8 ft)	64 m (210 ft)	47.46 m (155.7 ft)	2,834	5,668									
5	Wonder of the Seas	Oasis class	Royal Caribbean International	2022 (Note: This ship was the largest passenger ship in the world when it debuted.)	235,600	362.04 m (1,187.8 ft)	64 m (210 ft)	47.4 m (156 ft)	2,867	5,734	6,988								
6	Symphony of the Seas	Oasis class	Royal Caribbean International	2018	228,081	361.011 m (1,184.42 ft)	65.7 m (215.5 ft)	47.78 m (156.8 ft)	2,759	5,518	6,680								
7	Harmony of the Seas	Oasis class	Royal Caribbean International	2016	226,963	362.12 m (1,188.1 ft)	65.7 m (215.5 ft)	47.42 m (155.6 ft)	2,747	5,494 (Note: This number assumes only single occupancy of certain staterooms designed for only one passenger.)	6,687								
8	Oasis of the Seas	Oasis class	Royal Caribbean International	2009	226,838	360 m (1,180 ft)	60.5 m (198 ft)	47 m (154 ft)	2,742	5,484	6,771								
9	Allure of the Seas	Oasis class	Royal Caribbean International	2010	226,637	360 m (1,180 ft)	60.5 m (198 ft)	47 m (154 ft)	2,742	5,484	6,780								
10	MSC World America	World class	MSC Cruises	2025	216,638	333.3 m (1,094 ft)	47 m (154 ft)		2,626	5,231	6,762								
11	MSC World Europa	World class	MSC Cruises	2022	215,863	333.3 m (1,094 ft)	47 m (154 ft)		2,626	5,231	6,762								
12	Disney Adventure	Global class	Disney Cruise Line	2026	208,108	340.7 m (1,118 ft)	46.4 m (152 ft)		2,111	6,700									
13	Costa Toscana	Excellence class	Costa Cruises	2021	186,364	337 m (1,106 ft)	42 m (138 ft)		2,612	5,224	6,554								
14	Arvia	Excellence class	P&O Cruises	2022	185,581	344.5 m (1,130 ft)	42 m (138 ft)		2,614	5,200	6,685								
15	Costa Smeralda	Excellence class	Costa Cruises	2019	185,010	337 m (1,106 ft)	42 m (138 ft)		2,612	5,224	6,554								
16	Iona	Excellence class	P&O Cruises	2020	184,089	344.5 m (1,130 ft)	42 m (138 ft)		2,614	5,206	6,600								
17	MSC Euribia	Meraviglia Plus class	MSC Cruises	2023	184,011	331.43 m (1,087.4 ft)	65 m (213 ft)	50 m (160 ft)	2,408	4,816	6,335								
18	AIDAnova	Excellence class	AIDA Cruises	2018	183,858	337 m (1,106 ft)	42 m (138 ft)		2,626	5,252	6,654								
19	AIDAcosma	Excellence class	AIDA Cruises	2021	183,774	337 m (1,106 ft)	42 m (138 ft)		2,626	5,228	6,880								
20	Carnival Celebration	Excellence class	Carnival Cruise Line	2022	183,521	345 m (1,132 ft)	42 m (137 ft)	42 m (138 ft)	2,687	5,374	6,631								
21	Carnival Jubilee	Excellence class	Carnival Cruise Line	2023	182,015	345 m (1,132 ft)	42 m (138 ft)		2,626	5,228	6,631								
22	Mardi Gras	Excellence class	Carnival Cruise Line	2020	181,808	337.0 m (1,105.7 ft)	42 m (137 ft)	42 m (138 ft)	2,641	5,282	6,631								
23	MSC Grandiosa	Meraviglia Plus class	MSC Cruises	2019	181,541	331.43 m (1,087.4 ft)	43 m (141 ft)		2,632	5,264	6,761								
23	MSC Virtuosa	Meraviglia Plus class	MSC Cruises	2020	181,541	331.43 m (1,087.4 ft)	50 m (160 ft)	43 m (141 ft)	2,421	4,842	6,334								
25	Star Princess	Sphere class	Princess Cruises	2025	177,800 GT						4,300								
26	Sun Princess	Sphere class	Princess Cruises	2024	177,882	345 m (1,132 ft)	49.9 m (164 ft)	42.2 m (138 ft)	2,162	4,320	5,189								
27	MSC Meraviglia	Meraviglia class	MSC Cruises	2017	171,598	315.83 m (1,036.2 ft)	43 m (141 ft)		2,244	4,488	5,655								
27	MSC Bellissima	Meraviglia class	MSC Cruises	2019	171,598	315.83 m (1,036.2 ft)	43 m (141 ft)		2,217	4,434	5,686								
29	MSC Seashore	Seaside EVO class	MSC Cruises	2021	170,412	339 m (1,112 ft)	41 m (135 ft)		2,270	4,540	5,632								
29	MSC Seascape	Seaside EVO class	MSC Cruises	2022	170,412	339 m (1,112 ft)	41 m (135 ft)		2,270	4,540	5,877								
31	Spectrum of the Seas	Quantum Ultra class	Royal Caribbean International	2019	169,379	347.11 m (1,138.8 ft)	49.24 m (161.5 ft)	41.39 m (135.8 ft)	2,137	4,246	5,622								
32	Norwegian Encore	Breakaway Plus class	Norwegian Cruise Line	2019	169,116	333.44 m (1,094.0 ft)	48.13 m (157.9 ft)	41.39 m (135.8 ft)	2,040	3,998	Unknown								
33	Quantum of the Seas	Quantum class	Royal Caribbean International	2014	168,666	347.08 m (1,138.7 ft)	49.47 m (162.3 ft)	41.4 m (136 ft)	2,090	4,180	4,905								
33	Anthem of the Seas	Quantum class	Royal Caribbean International	2015	168,666	347.06 m (1,138.6 ft)	49.4 m (162 ft)	41.4 m (136 ft)	2,090	4,180	4,905								
33	Ovation of the Seas	Quantum class	Royal Caribbean International	2016	168,666	348 m (1,142 ft)	48.9 m (160 ft)	41.2 m (135 ft)	2,091	4,180	4,905								
36	Norwegian Bliss	Breakaway Plus class	Norwegian Cruise Line	2018	168,028	333.32 m (1,093.6 ft)	48.1 m (158 ft)	41.4 m (136 ft)	2,043	4,004	4,200								
37	Norwegian Joy	Breakaway Plus class	Norwegian Cruise Line	2017	167,725	333.46 m (1,094.0 ft)	41.4 m (136 ft)		1,925	3,804	3,883								
38	Odyssey of the Seas	Quantum Ultra class	Royal Caribbean International	2021	167,704	347.08 m (1,138.7 ft)	49.39 m (162.0 ft)	41.39 m (135.8 ft)	2,105	4,198	5,510								
39	Norwegian Escape	Breakaway Plus class	Norwegian Cruise Line	2015	165,157	325.9 m (1,069 ft)	46.5 m (153 ft)	41.4 m (136 ft)	2,124	4,248	Unknown								
40	Mein Schiff Relax	inTUItion class	TUI Cruises	2025	157,651	332.63 (1,091 ft)	42.14 m (138.3 ft)	41.8 m (137 ft)	1,945	3,890	3,984								
Mein Schiff Flow	InTUItion class	TUI Cruises	2026	160,000	333 m	42.4 m		41	Freedom of the Seas	Freedom class	Royal Caribbean International	2006	156,271	338.774 m (1,111.46 ft)	56 m (184 ft)	39.034 m (128.06 ft)	1,817	3,634	4,375
42	Liberty of the Seas	2007	155,889	339 m (1,112 ft)	56 m (184 ft)	39.0 m (128.1 ft)	1,817	3,634	4,375	Freedom class	Royal Caribbean International								
42	Independence of the Seas	2008	155,889	338.72 m (1,111.3 ft)	56 m (184 ft)	38.6 m (127 ft)	1,929	3,858	4,635	Freedom class	Royal Caribbean International								
44	Norwegian Epic	Epic class	Norwegian Cruise Line	2010	155,873	329.5 m (1,081 ft)	40.6 m (133 ft)		2,114	4,100	5,183								
45	Norwegian Aqua	Prima Plus class	Norwegian Cruise Line	2025	154,140	322 m (1,056 ft)	40.5 m (133 ft)		1,865	3,517	4,224								
45	Norwegian Luna	Prima Plus class	Norwegian Cruise Line	2026	154,140	322 m (1,056 ft)	40.5 m (133 ft)			~ 3,517									
47	MSC Seaview	Seaside class	MSC Cruises	2018	153,516	323 m (1,060 ft)	41 m (135 ft)		2,066	4,132	5,336								
47	MSC Seaside	Seaside class	MSC Cruises	2017	153,516	323 m (1,060 ft)	41 m (135 ft)		2,066	4,132	5,336								
49	Genting Dream	Genting-Dream class	Dream Cruises	2016	150,695	335.33 m (1,100.2 ft)	44.1 m (145 ft)	39.7 m (130 ft)	1,674	3,348	4,500								
49	Aroya	Genting-Dream class	Aroya Cruises	2017	150,695	335.2 m (1,100 ft)	44.35 m (145.5 ft)	39.75 m (130.4 ft)	1,686	Unknown	3,376								
51	Queen Mary 2	—	Cunard Line	2004	149,215	345.03 m (1,132.0 ft)	45 m (147 ft)	41 m (135 ft)	1,353	2,691	3,090								
52	Norwegian Breakaway	Breakaway class	Norwegian Cruise Line	2013	145,655	325.64 m (1,068.4 ft)	51.7 m (169.7 ft)	39.71 m (130.3 ft)	2,015	3,963	Unknown								
52	Norwegian Getaway	Breakaway class	Norwegian Cruise Line	2014	145,655	325.65 m (1,068.4 ft)	44.39 m (145.6 ft)	39.73 m (130.3 ft)	2,015	3,963	Unknown								
54	Sky Princess	Royal class	Princess Cruises	2019	145,281	330 m (1,080 ft)	38.4 m (126 ft)		1,830	3,660	4,610								
54	Enchanted Princess	Royal class	Princess Cruises	2020	145,281	329.92 m (1,082.4 ft)	38.42 m (126.0 ft)		1,830	3,660	Unknown								
54	Discovery Princess	Royal class	Princess Cruises	2022	145,281	330 m (1,080 ft)	38.42 m (126.0 ft)		1,830	3,660	Unknown								
57	Disney Wish	Wish class	Disney Cruise Line	2022	144,256	340.89 m (1,118.4 ft)	37 m (121 ft)	40.3 m (132 ft)	1,250	2,500	Unknown								
57	Disney Treasure	Wish class	Disney Cruise Line	2024	144,256	341.13 m (1,119.2 ft)	39 m (128 ft)		1,250	2,500	Unknown								
57	Disney Destiny	Wish class	Disney Cruise Line	2025	144,256														
60	Majestic Princess	Royal class	Princess Cruises	2017	144,216	330 m (1,080 ft)	38.4 m (126 ft)		1,780	3,560	5,600								
61	Britannia	Royal class	P&O Cruises	2015	143,730	330 m (1,080 ft)	Unknown	38.38 m (125.9 ft)	1,837	3,647	Unknown								
62	Norwegian Prima	Prima class	Norwegian Cruise Line	2022	143,535	299 m (981 ft)	51 m (167 ft)	40.5 m (133 ft)	Unknown	3,099	Unknown								
62	Norwegian Viva	Prima class	Norwegian Cruise Line	2023	143,535	282.1 m (926 ft)	43.84 m (143.8 ft)			3,099									
64	Royal Princess	Royal class	Princess Cruises	2013	142,714	330 m (1,080 ft)	47 m (155 ft)	38.4 m (126 ft)	1,780	3,560	4,340								
64	Regal Princess	Royal class	Princess Cruises	2014	142,714	330 m (1,080 ft)	Unknown	38.27 m (125.6 ft)	1,780	3,560	4,340								
Adora Flora City	Adora-class (Vista)	Adora Cruises	2026	141,900	341 m			66	Celebrity Beyond	Edge class	Celebrity Cruises	2022	141,420	326.5 m (1,071 ft)	Unknown	39.5 m (130 ft)	1,646	3,292	
Celebrity Ascent	2023	141,420	326.5 m (1,071 ft)	39.5 m (130 ft)		1,646	3,260	66	3,731	Edge class	Celebrity Cruises								
68	Celebrity Xcel	2025	141,262	326.5 m (1,071 ft)	39 m (128 ft)			3,260		Edge class	Celebrity Cruises								

Number of large ships by cruise line
Cruise line	Ships
Royal Caribbean International	16
MSC Cruises	10
Norwegian Cruise Line	11
Princess Cruises	7
Disney Cruise Line	4
Carnival Cruise Line	3
Costa Cruises	2
P&O Cruises	3
AIDA Cruises	2
Celebrity Cruises	2
TUI Cruises	1
Dream Cruises	1
Cunard	1
Aroya Cruises	1

Number of large ships by shipyard
Shipyard	Ships
Meyer Werft	21
Chantiers de l'Atlantique	15
Fincantieri, Monfalcone	13
Meyer Turku	13
Fincantieri, Marghera	4
Meyer Wismar	1

== On order ==
As of June 2026, 33 passenger ships are currently on order or under construction with a publicly announced size of over 140,000 GT. RCI has four Icon-class cruise ships on order with expected delivery in 2027, 2028, 2029, and 2030. RCI also has one Oasis-class ship on order for 2028. Celebrity Cruises, which is owned by RCI's parent company Royal Caribbean Group, will introduce a 140,600 GT Edge-class ships, and TUI Cruises, a joint venture between Royal Caribbean Group and TUI Group, are introducing a new class of 161,000 GT cruise ships in 2024 and 2026.

MSC Cruises has six World-class ships planned for 2026–2031 at 215,800 GT and a capacity of 6,762 passengers and four New-Frontier-class ships with a size of 180,000 GT for delivery from 2030 onwards.

Carnival Corporation has two more 183,200–183,900 GT Excellence class planned to debut in 2027 and 2028.

Each year from 2023 to 2027, the Norwegian Cruise Line will debut additional ships from the Prima class. The Prima-class ships are expected to be 142,500 GT and carry 3,215 to 3,550 passengers. Additionally, Norwegian Cruise Line is expected to take delivery of four approximately 200,000-gross-ton ships, each with a capacity of nearly 5,000 guests, in 2030, 2032, 2034 and 2036, which are subject to financing.

Disney Cruise Line will launch two more 144,000 GT Triton-class ships in 2024, and 2025. These ships will have 1,250 staterooms, like the line's previous two ships, but will be 14,000 GT larger than those ships and powered by liquified natural gas fuel.

Largest cruise ships on order
Rank (Note: Ships are ranked by gross tonnage and subsequently by the date they will enter service.)	Ship name (Note: Ship name and dimensions are sourced from press releases or other official communications from the cruise line or shipyard.)	Class or project name	Cruise line (Note: Cruise line that ordered the ship or is expected to take delivery)	Year (planned) (Note: Year the ship is planned to enter service, not when it is launched or floated out)	Gross tonnage	Shipyard	Passenger capacity (Note: Passenger capacity excludes crew.)							
Rank	Ship name	Class or project name	Cruise line	Year (planned)	Gross tonnage	Shipyard	Double (Note: Where official sources do not specify double occupancy capacity or lower berths capacity, this list assumes two passengers per stateroom (some ships have small rooms that only count as a single passenger when calculating double-occupancy).)	Maximum (Note: Maximum capacity of the ship, usually determined by total number of beds and/or SOLAS safety standards)						
1	Hero of the Seas	Icon class	Royal Caribbean International	2027	248,663	Meyer Turku	5,610							
1	TBA	Icon class	Royal Caribbean International	2028	248,663	Meyer Turku	5,610							
1	TBA	Icon class	Royal Caribbean International	2029	248,663	Meyer Turku	5,610							
1	TBA	Icon class	Royal Caribbean International	2030	248,663	Meyer Turku	5,610							
5	TBA	Oasis class	Royal Caribbean International	2028	231,000	Chantiers de l'Atlantique	5,714							
6	Carnival Destiny	Project Ace	Carnival Cruise Line	2029	230,000	Fincantieri		8,000						
6	TBA	Project Ace	Carnival Cruise Line	2031	230,000	Fincantieri		8,000						
6	TBA	Project Ace	Carnival Cruise Line	2033	230,000	Fincantieri		8,000						
9	TBA		Norwegian Cruise Line	2030	226,000	Fincantieri	5,100							
9	TBA		Norwegian Cruise Line	2032	226,000	Fincantieri	5,100							
9	TBA		Norwegian Cruise Line	2034	226,000	Fincantieri	5,100							
9	TBA		Norwegian Cruise Line	2036	226,000	Fincantieri	5,100							
13	MSC World Asia	World class	MSC Cruises	2026	215,863	Chantiers de l'Atlantique	5,400							
13	MSC World Atlantic	World class	MSC Cruises	2027	215,863	Chantiers de l'Atlantique	5,400							
13	TBA	World class	MSC Cruises	2029	215,863	Chantiers de l'Atlantique	5,400							
13	TBA	World class	MSC Cruises	2030	215,863	Chantiers de l'Atlantique	5,400							
13	TBA	World class	MSC Cruises	2030	215,863	Chantiers de l'Atlantique	5,400							
13	TBA	World class	MSC Cruises	2031	215,863	Chantiers de l'Atlantique	5,400							
19	Carnival Festivale	Excellence class	Carnival Cruise Line	2027	183,900	Meyer Werft	5,400							
19	Carnival Tropicale	Excellence class	Carnival Cruise Line	2028	183,900	Meyer Werft	5,400							
21	TBA	"New Frontier" platform	MSC Cruises	2030	180,000	Meyer Werft								
21	TBA	"New Frontier" platform	MSC Cruises	2031	180,000	Meyer Werft								
21	TBA	"New Frontier" platform	MSC Cruises	2032	180,000	Meyer Werft								
21	TBA	"New Frontier" platform	MSC Cruises	2033	180,000	Meyer Werft								
25	Norwegian Aura	Prima Plus class	Norwegian Cruise Line	2027	172,000	Fincantieri	3,650							
25	TBA	Prima Plus class	Norwegian Cruise Line	2028	172,000	Fincantieri	3,650							
27	Mein Schiff Flow	inTUItion class	TUI Cruises	2026	161,000	Fincantieri	4,000							
27	TBA	inTUItion class	TUI Cruises	2031	161,000	Fincantieri	4,000							
27	TBA	inTUItion class	TUI Cruises	2033	161,000	Fincantieri	4,000							
30	Adora Flora City	Vista class	Adora Cruises	2026	142,000	Shanghai Waigaoqiao Shipbuilding	2,130	5,232						
31	Celebrity Xcite	Edge-class	Celebrity Cruises	2028	140,600	Chantiers de l'Atlantique								
32	Disney Believe	Wish class	Disney Cruise Line	2027	140,000	Meyer Werft	2,500							
32	Disney Imagination	Wish class	Wish class	Disney Cruise Line Japan (Oriental Land Co.)	140,000	Meyer Werft	2,500		2029	140,000	341 m	Meyer Werft	NYK Line	2028

Number of large ship orders by cruise line
Cruise line	Ships
MSC Cruises	10
Norwegian Cruise Line	6
Royal Caribbean International	5
Carnival Cruise Line	5
TUI Cruises	3
Disney Cruise Line	1
NYK Line	1
Celebrity Cruises	1
Adora Cruises	1

Number of large ships orders by shipyard
Shipyard	Ships
Fincantieri	12
Chantiers de l'Atlantique	8
Meyer Werft	8
Meyer Turku	4
Shanghai Waigaoqiao Shipbuilding	1

== See also ==
- List of cruise lines
- List of largest cruise lines
- List of cruise ships
- List of largest passenger ships
- List of largest ships by gross tonnage
- List of longest ships
- List of largest container ships
- Timeline of largest passenger ships
