= List of ship launches in 2021 =

This is a chronological list of ships launched in 2021.

Date	Ship	Class / type	Builder	Location	Country	Notes
6 January	Salamanca	E-Flexer-class ferry	AVIC		China	for Brittany Ferries
12 January	John Lewis	John Lewis-class replenishment oiler	NASSCO	San Diego	United States	For United States Navy
14 January	Silver Dawn	cruise ship	Fincantieri	Ancona	Italy	For Silversea Cruises
14 January	Costa Toscana	Excellence-class cruise ship	Meyer Turku	Turku	Finland	For Costa Crociere
26 January	Viking Glory	ferry	Xiamen Shipbuilding Industry	Xiamen	China	For Viking Line
8 February	Montana	Virginia-class submarine	Huntington Ingalls Industries	Newport News	United States	For United States Navy
1 March	Thun Equality	E-class tanker	Ferus Smit			
3 March	Mogami	Mogami-class frigate	Mitsubishi Heavy Industries	Nagasaki	Japan	For Japan Maritime Self-Defense Force
3 March	Charlie	F-500 vessel				For dship Carriers
11 March	Janssonius	cruise ship	Brodosplit	Split	Croatia	For Oceanwide Expeditions
18 March	Discovery Princess	Royal-class cruise ship	Fincantieri	Monfalcone	Italy	For Princess Cruises
26 March	Magadan	Kilo-class submarine	Admiralty Shipyard	Saint Petersburg	Russia	For the Russian Navy
31 March	Celebrity Beyond	Edge-class cruise ship	Chantiers de l'Atlantique	Saint Nazaire	France	For Celebrity Cruises
March	Sylvia Earle	Infinity-class cruise ship	China Merchants Heavy Industry	Haimen	China	For SunStone Ships
20 April	Anson	Astute-class submarine	BAE Systems	Barrow-in-Furness	United Kingdom	For Royal Navy
26 April	Finneco I	ferry	Nanjing Jinling Shipyard		China	For Finnlines
30 April	Arklow Artist		Ferus Smit	Westerbroek	Netherlands	
April	Yushan		CSBC yard		Taiwan	For Taiwanese Navy
23 May	W0270	E-Flexer-Mk II-class ferry	AVIC		China	for Stena RoRo
22 June	Noshiro	Mogami-class frigate	Mitsubishi Heavy Industries	Nagasaki	Japan	For Japan Maritime Self-Defense Force
23 June	SH Minerva	cruise ship	Helsinki Shipyard	Helsinki	Finland	For Swan Hellenic
1 July	Rezkiy	Steregushchiy-class corvette	Amur Shipbuilding Plant	Komsomolsk-on-Amur	Russia	For the Russian Navy
2 July	Resilient Lady	cruise ship	Fincantieri	Genoa	Italy	For Virgin Voyages
10 July	AIDAcosma	Helios-class cruise ship	Meyer Werft	Papenburg	Germany	For AIDA Cruises
15 July	Viking Mars (ship)	Venice-class cruise ship	Fincantieri	Ancona	Italy	For Viking Cruises
27 July	Thun Empower	oil/chemical tanker	Ferus Smit	Leer	Germany	For Thun AB from Lidkoping, Sweden
30 July	Krasnoyarsk	Yasen-M-class submarine	Sevmash	Severodvinsk	Russia	For Russian Navy
July		Green Ship-class ferry	Jinling Shipyard		China	For TT-Line
July	Viking Polaris	expedition ship	VARD		Romania	For Viking Cruises
12 August	My Star	ferry	Raum Marine Constructions		Finland	For Tallink
August	Norwegian Prima	Project Leonardo cruise ship	Fincantieri	Marghera	Italy	For Norwegian Cruise Line
August	Seabourn Venture	cruise ship	T. Mariotti	Genova	Italy	For Seabourn Cruise Line
August	H2664	car carrier			China	For United European Car Carriers
10 September	Arklow Clipper		Ferus Smit	Westerbroek	Netherlands	
19 September	A Galeotta	RoPax	Visentini shipyard	Porto Viro	Italy	For Corsica Linea
14 October	Hakugei	Taigei-class submarine	Kawasaki Heavy Industries	Kobe	Japan	For Japan Maritime Self-Defense Force
20 October	YOT-01	oil tanker	Shin Kurushima Hashihama Dockyard	Hashihama	Japan	For Japan Maritime Self-Defense Force
27 October	Ocean Odyssey	Infinity-class cruise ship	China Merchants Heavy Industry (CMHI)	Haimen	China	For SunStone Ships
29 October	Mark W. Barker	bulk carrier	Fincantieri	Sturgeon Bay	United States	For Interlake Steamship Company
18 November	MSC Seascape	Seaside-EVO-class cruise ship	Fincantieri	Monfalcone	Italy	For MSC Cruises
18 November	Melchora Aquino	Teresa Magbanua-class patrol vessel	Mitsubishi Heavy Industries	Hikoshima	Japan	For Philippine Coast Guard
November	Friedrichsort	passenger ship	Holland Shipyards		Netherlands	For Schlepp- und Fährgesellschaft Kiel
2 December	MSC World Europa	World-class cruise ship	Chantiers de l'Atlantique	Saint-Nazaire	France	For MSC Cruises
17 December	Adora Magic City	Vista-class cruise ship	CSSC, Shanghai Waigaoqiao Shipbuilding		China	For CSSC Carnival Cruise Shipping
17 December	Arklow Cloud		Ferus Smit	Westerbroek	Netherlands	
25 December	Generalissimus Suvorov	Borei-class submarine	Sevmash	Severodvinsk	Russia	For the Russian Navy
