= Mardi Gras (2020 ship) =

Excellence-class cruise ship

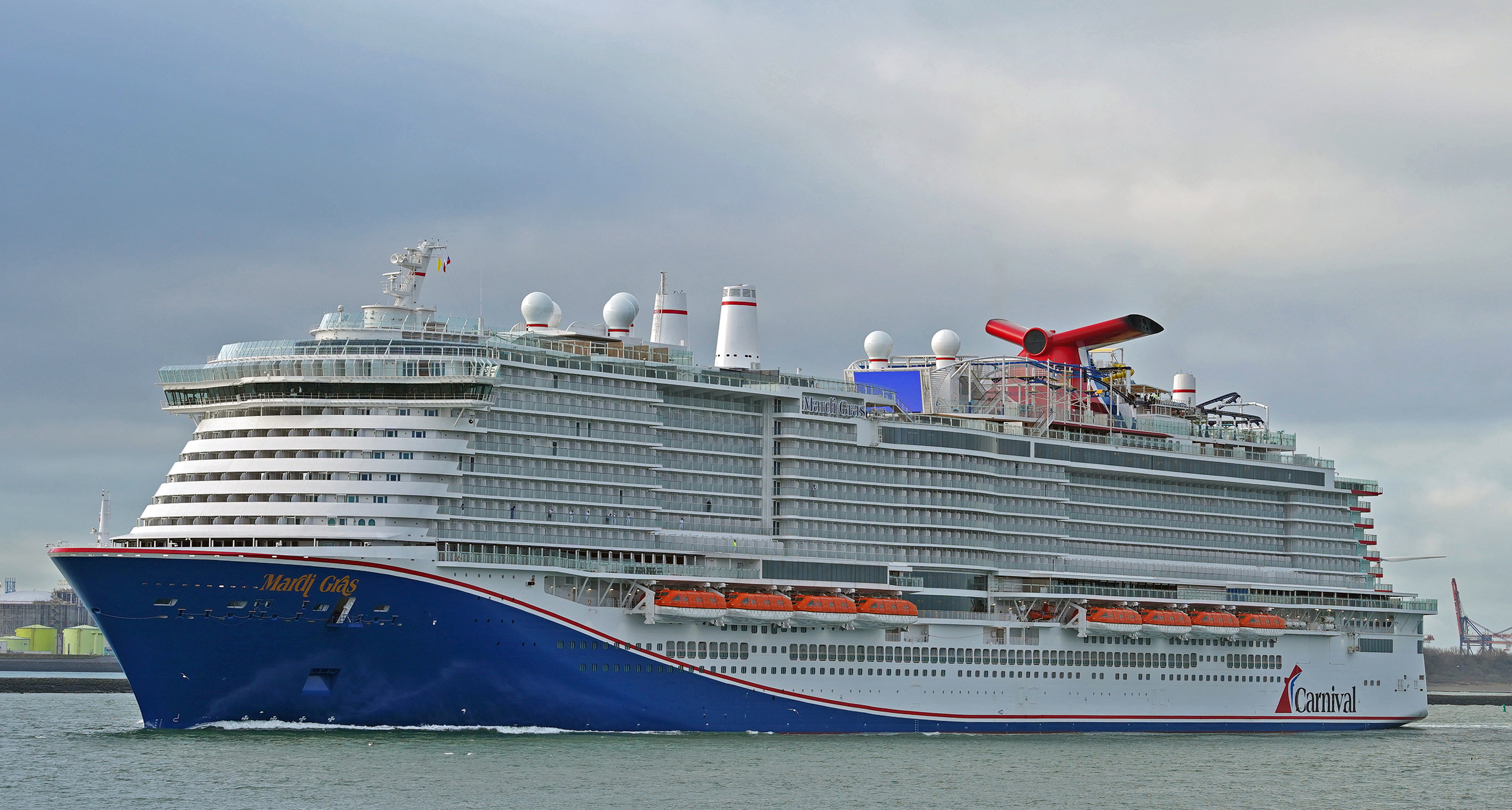
- Mardi Gras in Rotterdam, 2020

History

Bahamas
- Name: Mardi Gras
- Namesake: TSS Mardi Gras
- Owner: Carnival Corporation
- Operator: Carnival Cruise Line
- Port of registry: Nassau, Bahamas
- Ordered: 6 September 2016
- Builder: Meyer Turku (Finland)
- Cost: £1 billion (2020) (equivalent to £1.17 billion in 2024)
- Yard number: NB 1396
- Laid down: 18 June 2019
- Launched: 24 January 2020
- Sponsored by: Kimberly Jiménez
- Christened: 23 October 2021
- Acquired: 18 December 2020
- Maiden voyage: 31 July 2021
- In service: 2021–present
- Identification: Call sign: 3EQW4; IMO number: 9837444; MMSI number: 352049000
- Status: in active service

General characteristics
- Class & type: Excellence-class cruise ship
- Tonnage: 181,808 GT
- Length: 1,130 ft (344.5m)
- Beam: 42 m (138 ft)
- Height: 69.3 m (227 ft 4 in)
- Depth: 11.8 m (39 ft)
- Decks: 18 (15 for passengers)
- Propulsion: 2 × 18.5MW Azimuth Electric Propulsion Drive
- Speed: 23 knots (43 km/h; 26 mph) (projected)
- Capacity: 5,282 passengers (double occupancy); 6,500 passengers (maximum capacity)
- Crew: 2,000

Mardi Gras is an Excellence-class cruise ship operated by Carnival Cruise Line. She is Carnival's lead vessel of the fleet's Excel-class, a subclass of the Excellence class, and was built by Finnish shipbuilder Meyer Turku in Turku, Finland. She also has often been incorrectly referred to as Carnival Mardi Gras, though Carnival has specified that her name does not include the "Carnival" prefix, a first since the Fantasy-class vessels originally omitted "Carnival" in their names upon their debuts. Mardi Gras has been subject to numerous delays in her construction, delivery, and debut amid the COVID-19 pandemic and its subsequent impact on tourism. First scheduled for a summer 2020 delivery and debut, she was delivered to Carnival on 18 December 2020. After her debut was postponed on numerous occasions, Mardi Gras began operating weekly sailings on 31 July 2021.

== Design ==
Mardi Gras measures 181,808 GT and has a maximum passenger capacity of 6,500 passengers, with approximately 2,000 crew members. Mardi Gras is divided into six zones incorporating themed elements and spaces that host activities and events and also house various dining and shopping outlets. On her top decks is the "Ultimate Playground" zone, where the world's first shipboard roller coaster, named "Bolt", is located. Designed by Maurer AG, the ride consists of self-propelled cars that ride on an 800-foot track and can travel up to 40 mph (64 km/h). "Bolt" is also joined by a water park and sports center.

== Construction ==
On 6 September 2016, Finnish shipbuilder Meyer Turku announced it had signed a memorandum of agreement with Carnival Corporation & plc to build two 180,000 GT ships for Carnival Cruise Line, with deliveries expected in 2020 and 2022, respectively. The ships would be powered by liquefied natural gas (LNG), making them the first LNG-powered ships to be based in North America. Carnival explained that the company's pivot towards LNG was due in part to the demands voiced by environmental groups and the European Union to reduce greenhouse gases and other emissions. In order to fulfill the order, Meyer Turku postponed the delivery of sister brand Costa Cruises' second Excellence-class vessel by one year to 2021.

On 15 November 2018, Carnival held the steel-cutting ceremony for the ship at Meyer Turku. Carnival also unveiled the new ship's livery, which features a predominantly blue hull with red and white accents. The new style marked a departure from the fleet's mostly white hulls and was commissioned by Carnival in an effort to market the brand as "America's Cruise Line." On the 5 December 2018 episode of American game show Wheel of Fortune, hosts Pat Sajak and Vanna White initially revealed the name of the ship as Carnival Mardi Gras, after Carnival's first ship, TSS Mardi Gras, which operated for Carnival from 1972 to 1993. Prior to the reveal, leaked renderings of a ship bearing the name Carnival Reflection fueled speculation that Carnival's next ship would be named as such. After the reveal, Carnival issued a press release clarifying the ship's name as simply Mardi Gras.

In May 2019, a floating engine room unit built at Neptun Werft in Rostock headed for Turku. On 18 June 2019, the ship's keel was laid at Meyer Turku with the traditional coin ceremony, in which a coin was set atop the ship's keel blocks. On 24 January 2020, Mardi Gras was floated out and repositioned elsewhere in the shipyard to complete her outfitting. In March 2020, a fire contained to a cabin broke out during final outfitting work; no further damage was reported. On 28 September 2020, the ship set sail for her first set of sea trials for 10 days from Airisto.

Compounded by the impact of the COVID-19 pandemic, Mardi Gras's delivery was affected by construction delays at Meyer Turku, joining sister ships AIDAnova and Costa Smeralda in having experienced similar delays by her shipbuilder's parent company Meyer Werft. Most of the delays affecting all vessels were blamed on the complexities associated with building and installing the ships' new technologies, as well as organizing the logistics of the ships' construction. After first postponing the delivery to October 2020, Meyer Turku delivered the ship to Carnival on 18 December 2020.

On 16 May 2021, Carnival president Christine Duffy announced at Miss Universe 2020 that Miss Dominican Republic 2020 Kimberly Jiménez would christen the ship upon her debut. The following day, Carnival announced Mardi Gras would begin operating under the Bahamian flag after it was previously registered to Panama. Jiménez officially christened the vessel on 23 October 2021 at Port Canaveral.

=== Port Canaveral ===
In order to accommodate Mardi Gras as her new homeport, Port Canaveral developed and constructed Terminal 3, a new two-story, 188,000-square-foot cruise terminal that cost US$163 million to build, becoming the largest project in the port's history. Work began with the approval of the contract to demolish the existing Terminal 3 on 28 March 2018 and demolition began on 27 April 2018. The first steel arrived at the site in late-November 2018. Official construction began in January 2019 and had been expected to be completed by April 2020. On 9 June 2020, the facility received its certificate of occupancy and was subsequently completed.

To bunker Mardi Gras, Port Canaveral partnered with Royal Dutch Shell to use barges from Elba Island in Georgia for receiving LNG, as the port will not store it in its land-based tanks.

== Service history ==
Mardi Gras was initially scheduled to debut on 31 August 2020 on a nine-day Northern Europe sailing between Copenhagen and Southampton before operating a transatlantic crossing to New York for a short fall season of cruises to the Maritimes. She would then debut at Port Canaveral on 16 October 2020, sailing weekly itineraries to the Caribbean. However, on 20 December 2019, citing construction delays, Carnival announced that Mardi Gras would be delivered in October 2020 and the ship's maiden voyage would be postponed to 14 November 2020 from Port Canaveral, which forced the cancellation of her European and New York itineraries. On 7 July 2020, Carnival announced a second postponement for Mardi Gras's commencement after the pandemic further delayed the ship's construction and lengthened Carnival's operations pause, pushing the maiden voyage to 6 February 2021. Carnival's continued operations pause led to a third postponement to 24 April 2021, a fourth to 29 May 2021, a fifth to 3 July 2021, and a sixth to 31 July 2021.

Mardi Gras arrived at Port Canaveral on 4 June 2021 from the Port of Barcelona, where she was docked between January and 21 May 2021. On 31 July 2021, Mardi Gras debuted on her first sailing, a pre-inaugural week-long Caribbean voyage.

Carnival Mardi Gras is almost leaving her homeport Port Canaveral in Florida on 5 September 2026
