= Carnival Celebration =

Cruise ship operated by Carnival Cruise Line

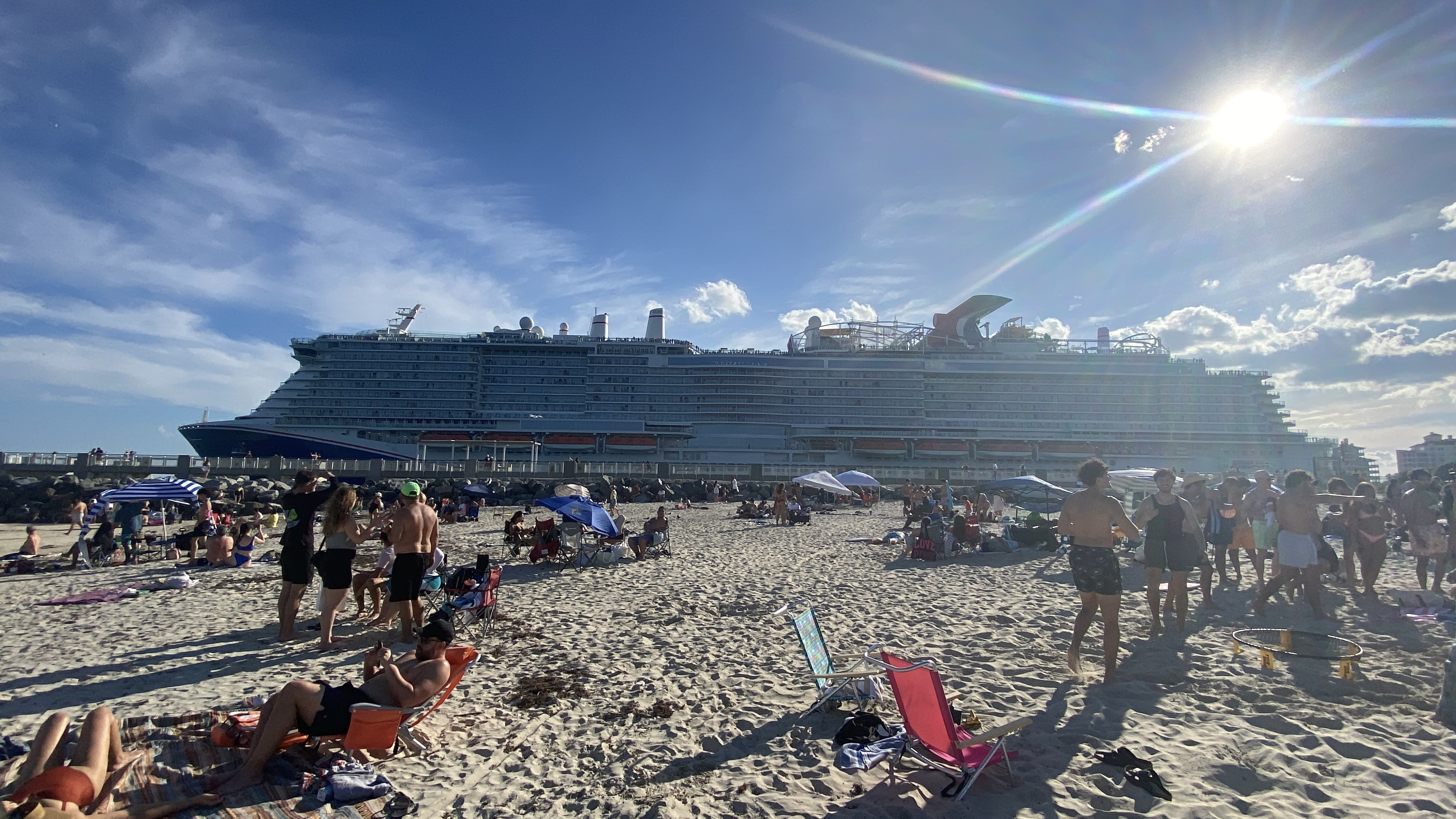
- Carnival Celebration Departs Miami, Florida, 2026

History

Bahamas
- Name: Carnival Celebration
- Namesake: MS Celebration
- Owner: Carnival Corporation
- Operator: Carnival Cruise Line
- Port of registry: Nassau, Bahamas
- Ordered: 6 September 2016
- Builder: Meyer Turku
- Cost: $1 billion
- Laid down: January 2021
- Launched: 11 February 2022
- Sponsored by: Cassidy Gifford
- Christened: 20 November 2022
- Completed: 2 November 2022
- Maiden voyage: 6 November 2022
- In service: 2022–present
- Identification: Call sign: C6GE4; IMO number: 9837456; MMSI number: 311001223

General characteristics
- Class & type: Excellence-class cruise ship
- Tonnage: 183,521 GT
- Length: 1,130 ft (344.5m)
- Beam: 137 ft (42 m)
- Height: 69.3 m (227 ft 4 in)
- Decks: 19
- Speed: 23 knots (43 km/h; 26 mph) (projected)
- Capacity: 5,374 passengers (double occupancy); 6,500 passengers (maximum capacity)
- Crew: 1,735

Carnival Celebration is an Excel-class cruise ship operated by Carnival Cruise Line. She is Carnival's second vessel of the fleet's Excel class, a subclass of Carnival Corporation & plc's Excellence class. At 183,521 GT, she is the largest ship in Carnival's fleet. Unlike her sister ship, Mardi Gras, as well as the original Celebration, this ship is named Carnival Celebration using the Carnival prefix. Her name was announced on 21 August 2020. She was ordered on 6 November 2016 from the Finnish shipyard Meyer Turku. She features the worlds second roller coaster at sea, named Bolt (first launched on Mardi Gras). Construction started on 13 January 2021 and was completed on 2 November 2022.

== Design and specifications ==
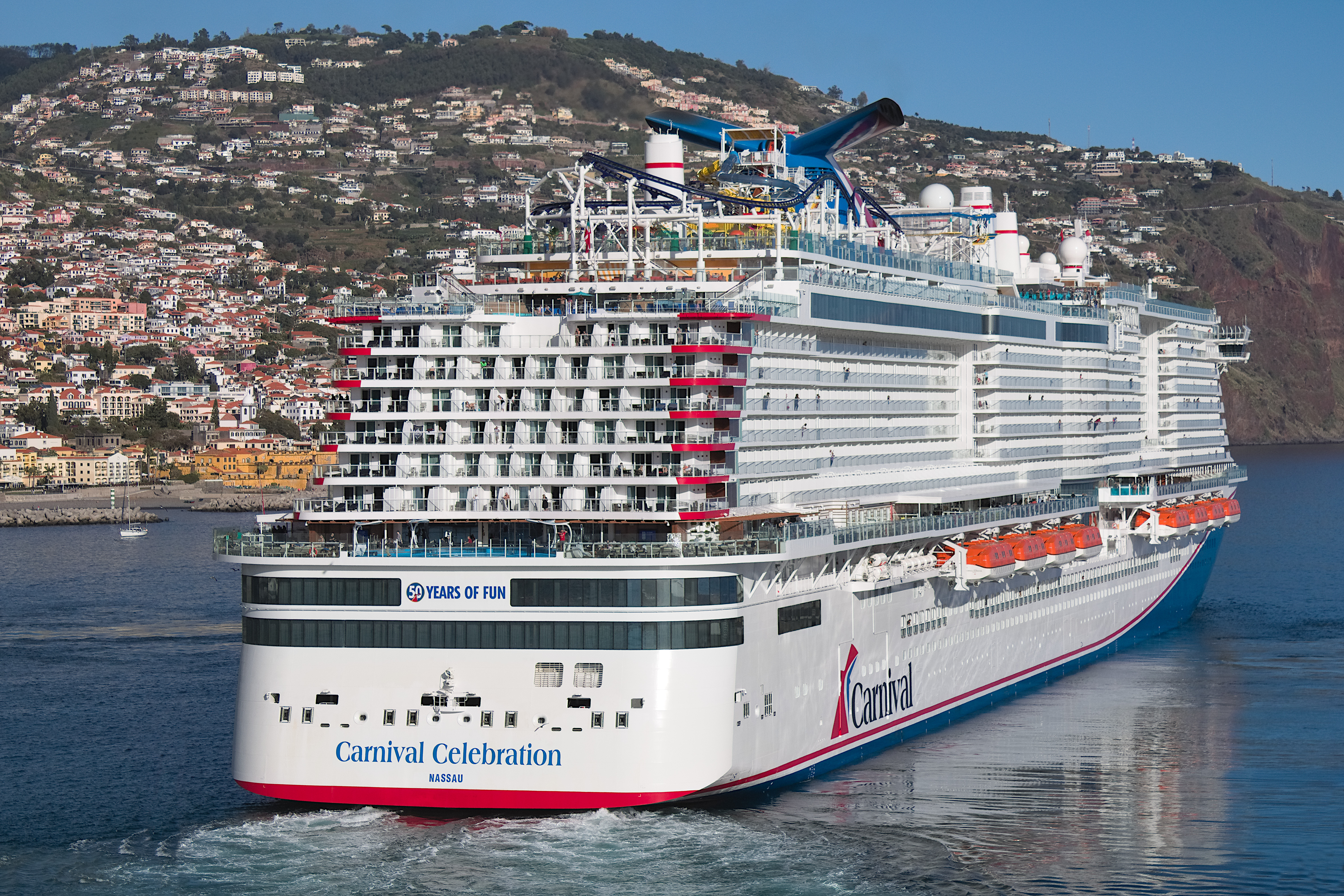
Carnival Celebration leaving Funchal, Portugal, 2022

Carnival Celebration is divided into six zones incorporating themed elements and spaces that host activities and events and also house various dining and shopping outlets. On her top decks, Carnival Celebration hosts the "Ultimate Playground" zone, where the shipboard roller coaster is located, dubbed "Bolt". Designed by Maurer AG, the ride consists of self-propelled cars that ride on an 800-foot track and can travel up to 40 mph (64 km/h). Bolt was first launched on Mardi Gras, in 2020. "Bolt" is accompanied by an extensive water park and sports center.

Specific to Carnival Celebration, a new zone called The Gateway features the Golden Jubilee bar and lounge. This is not only dedicated to the cruise line's 50th anniversary but also featuring both replica and original items taken from retired ships of the past, from the original Mardi Gras to Carnival Fascination. This replaces the Brass Magnolia that is featured on her sister ship, Mardi Gras.

== Area of operation ==
The ship operates from Miami, Florida sailing a mixture of 6-8 day cruises to the Eastern, Western and Southern Caribbean after a 14-day transatlantic cruise, which departed from Southampton, England on 6 November 2022.
