= Martin Saarikangas =

Finnish shipbuilder and vuorineuvos (born 1937)

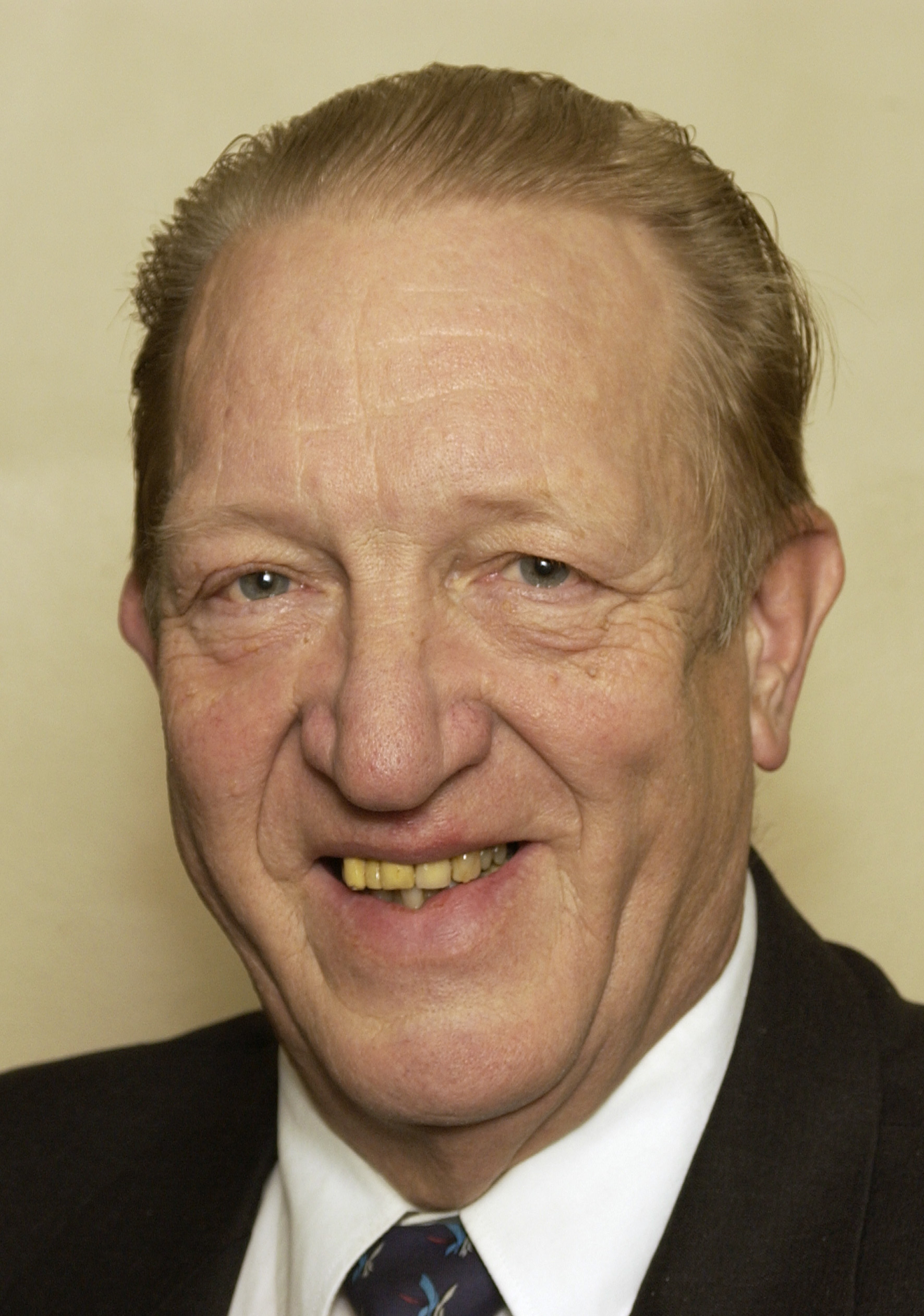
- Born: 24 January 1937; Helsinki, Finland
- Occupation: Shipbuilder

Martin Saarikangas (born 24 January 1937) is a Finnish shipbuilder and vuorineuvos, best known as the co-founder of Masa-Yards (now Meyer Turku), after the bankruptcy of Wärtsilä Marine. From 2003 to 2007 he was a member of the Finnish Parliament as part of the National Coalition Party. In 1994 he played three minutes for Finnish association football top flight side TPS Turku at the age of 57.
