= Carnival Jubilee =

Carnival Cruise Line cruise ship

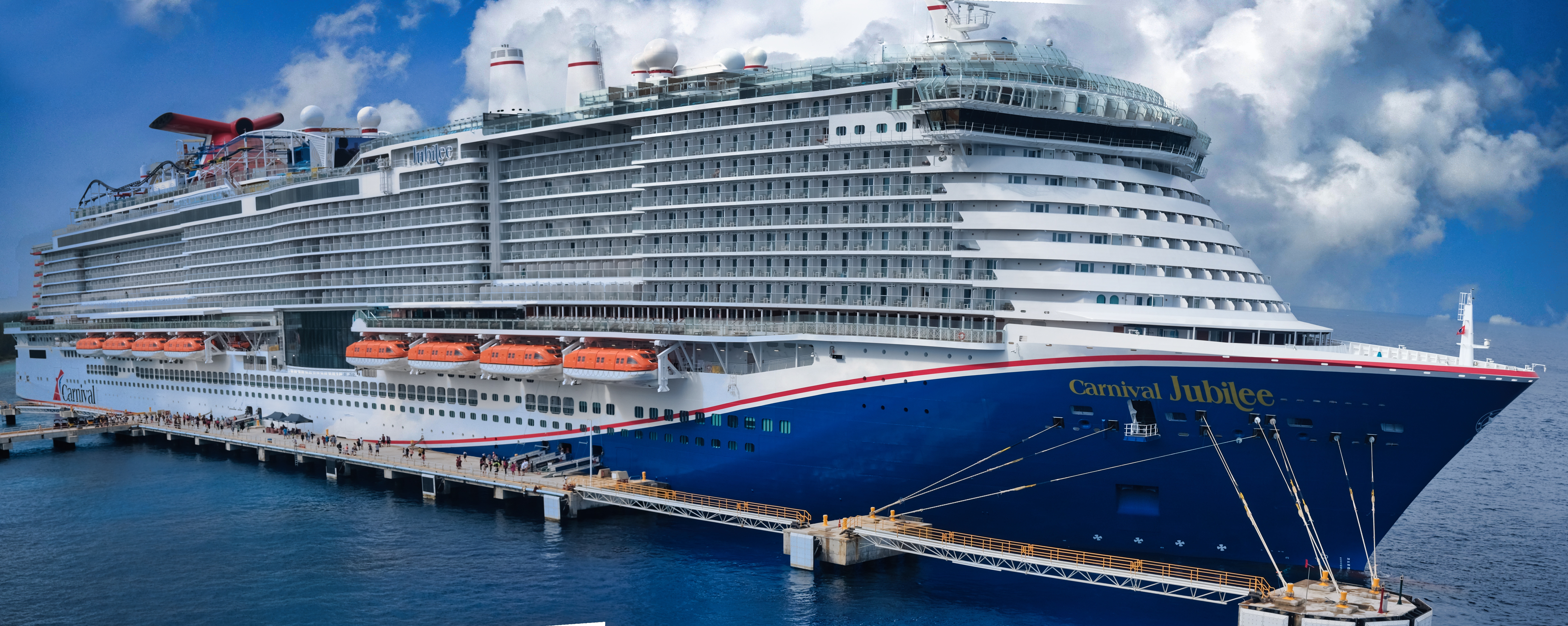
- Carnival Jubilee docked at Cozumel, Mexico, in 2024

History

Bahamas
- Name: Carnival Jubilee
- Namesake: Jubilee
- Owner: Carnival Corporation
- Operator: Carnival Cruise Line
- Port of registry: Nassau, Bahamas
- Builder: Meyer Werft, Papenburg, Germany
- Yard number: 717
- Laid down: 18 March 2022
- Launched: 22 July 2023
- Sponsored by: Gwen Stefani
- Christened: 24 February 2024
- Completed: 4 December 2023
- Acquired: 4 December 2023
- Maiden voyage: 23 December 2023
- In service: 2023–present
- Identification: Call sign: C6GY5; IMO number: 9851737; MMSI number: 311001390

General characteristics
- Class & type: Excellence-class cruise ship
- Tonnage: 183,521 GT
- Length: 345 m (1,131 ft 11 in) (load line); 345.39 m (1,133 ft 2 in) (max)
- Beam: 42 m (137 ft 10 in)
- Height: 69.3 m (227 ft 4 in)
- Depth: 11.8 m (38 ft 9 in)
- Decks: 19
- Installed power: 4 engines, total 66,460 kW (90,360 hp)
- Propulsion: 2 × Azimuth thrusters, total 3,700 kW (5,000 hp)
- Capacity: 5,228 passengers (double occupancy); 6,631 passengers (max)
- Crew: 1,745

Carnival Jubilee is a cruise ship built for Carnival Cruise Line. It is the third ship of the line's Excel class, although it was the first built by Meyer Werft at Papenburg, Germany. It was delivered to Carnival on 4 December 2023, and entered service on 23 December 2023 out of the Port of Galveston in the United States. At 182,015 gross tonnage (GT), Carnival Jubilee is one of the largest cruise ships in the world.

== Construction and career ==
In February 2018, the order of a third ship for AIDA Cruises was announced with a planned delivery in the first half of 2023.

Construction on the ship started on 18 March 2022, originally for Carnival's sister-line AIDA Cruises, but Carnival announced in June 2021 that it would be taking delivery of the ship instead. The last block was installed in winter 2023. Floating Engine Room Unit was built at Neptun Werft, Rostock. After her float out in July 2023 and the installation of the wing funnel outside the building hall, the ship was transferred from the building yard at Papenburg in Germany to Eemshaven in the Netherlands in October 2023. She completed her first round of sea trials on 14 November 2023 in the North Sea.

Due to construction delays, the first cruises were cancelled. The ship was delivered on 4 December.

In January 2024, the ship rescued two men on a kayak in the Gulf of Mexico.
