= Costa Smeralda (ship) =

Excellence-class cruise ship operated by Costa Cruises

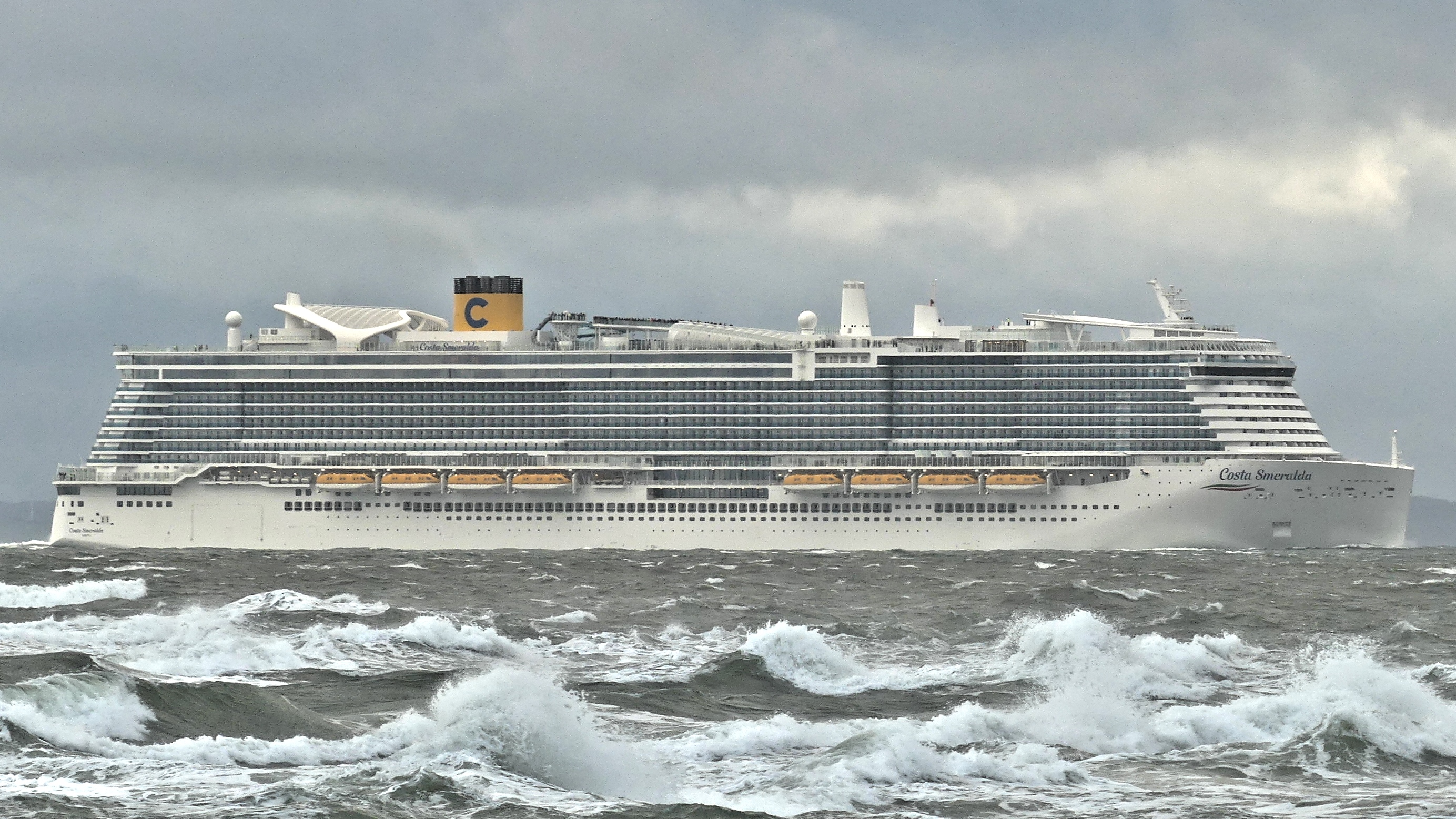
- Costa Smeralda in Storebælt, December 2019

History

Italy
- Name: Costa Smeralda
- Owner: Carnival Corporation & plc
- Operator: Costa Cruises
- Port of registry: Genova, Italy
- Ordered: 15 June 2015
- Builder: Meyer Turku
- Yard number: 1394
- Laid down: 4 July 2018
- Launched: 15 March 2019
- Sponsored by: Penélope Cruz
- Christened: 22 February 2020
- Completed: 5 December 2019
- Acquired: 5 December 2019
- In service: 2019—present
- Identification: Call sign: IBCA; IMO number: 9781889; MMSI number: 247391900
- Status: In service

General characteristics
- Class & type: Excellence-class cruise ship
- Tonnage: 185,010 GT
- Length: 337 m (1,105 ft 8 in)
- Beam: 42 m (137 ft 10 in)
- Draught: 8.8 m (28 ft 10 in)
- Depth: 11.8 m (38 ft 9 in)
- Installed power: 4 × Caterpillar MaK 16VM46DF, 57,200 kW (76,700 hp)
- Propulsion: 2 × Azimuth Electric Propulsion Drive; 2 × 18,500 kW (24,800 hp)
- Speed: 21.5 knots (39.8 km/h; 24.7 mph) (Service speed)
- Capacity: 5,224 passengers (double occupancy); 6,554 (maximum capacity)
- Crew: 1,646

Costa Smeralda is an Excellence-class cruise ship currently operated by Costa Cruises, a subsidiary of Carnival Corporation & plc. At 185,010 gross tonnage (GT), she is the second-largest ship commissioned for and to ever operate for Costa (after her sister ship, Costa Toscana), and is the 14th-largest cruise ship in the world, as of 2025. Costa Smeralda is also the second cruise ship in the world to be fully powered by liquefied natural gas (LNG), making Costa the second cruise line to operate a ship running on LNG, after sister brand, AIDA Cruises, became the first in 2018.

== Design and description ==
As an LNG-powered vessel, Costa Smeralda is powered by dual-fuel hybrid engines and receives all of its onboard and navigational power from LNG.

Costa Smeralda derives its design and technical template from the original prototype of the Helios class, which would later come to form AIDAnova. The ship is fitted with four 16-cylinder, MaK 16VM46DF models, with each cylinder rated for a maximum output in excess of 960 kilowatts (1,290 hp), totaling 15,440 kilowatts (20,710 hp) per engine. Maximum power is rated at 37,000 kilowatts (50,000 hp).

Costa Smeralda has 20 decks and a length of 337 metres (1,105 ft 8 in), a draught of 8.8 metres (28 ft 10 in), and a beam of 42 metres (137 ft 10 in). Passenger capacity is 5,224 with double occupancy and 6,554 at maximum capacity housed within a total of 2,612 passenger cabins. The crew complement is 1,646. The system gives the vessel a service speed of 21.5 knots (39.8 km/h; 24.7 mph).

== Construction and career ==
=== Planning and construction ===
On 15 June 2015, Carnival Corporation announced an order for four 180,000 gross-ton cruise ships powered by liquefied natural gas (LNG) from Meyer Turku in Turku, Finland, with one of the ships eventually being built for Costa.

On 13 September 2017, Costa announced the name of its first LNG-powered vessel as Costa Smeralda, after the Costa Smeralda ("Emerald coast") in Sardinia, at the ship's steel-cutting ceremony at Meyer Turku's shipyard. 4 July 2018 marked the beginning of the ship's hull assembly with the keel laying and coin ceremonies. She was floated out from the shipyard on 15 March 2019. The ship began a round of sea trials on 7 October 2019. A separate round of sea trials began on 16 November 2019 and was successfully completed shortly thereafter.

Meyer Turku constructed the ship with the help from sister yard, Neptun Werft, in supplying a section containing the ship's main and auxiliary machinery and related systems.

=== Delivery and christening ===
Costa Smeralda's delivery was marred by extensive construction delays that postponed her debut by two months and caused Costa to scrap initial inaugural festivities, including her maiden voyage, that were planned for the ship. Costa Smeralda's two postponements in delivery marks four substantial delays overall in construction and delivery for an Excellence-class vessel, after AIDAnova also experienced two postponements in delivery in 2018 at Meyer Werft.

The ship was originally slated to be delivered in October 2019. Her debut was scheduled to be on 20 October 2019, with a 15-day maiden cruise from Hamburg to Savona. Her christening ceremony was scheduled to be on 3 November 2019 in Savona, after which she would begin cruising the Western Mediterranean.

On 16 September 2019, Meyer Turku and Costa announced that Costa Smeralda's delivery would be postponed by approximately one month, to mid-November 2019, citing technical complexities with the construction. All cruises and ceremonies scheduled prior to this date were subsequently cancelled and the ship's maiden cruise was postponed to 30 November 2019 and moved from Hamburg to Savona. On 29 October 2019, Meyer Turku announced a second postponement in delivery for Costa Smeralda and restated the complexities as the reason for driving the project's timeline beyond the planned schedule. The inaugural voyage from Savona was now postponed to 21 December 2019.

On 5 December 2019, Meyer Turku delivered Costa Smeralda to Costa at the Meyer Turku shipyard. She was christened by her godmother, Penélope Cruz, on 22 February 2020 in Savona.

=== Operational career ===
Following her delivery, Costa Smeralda left Turku on 6 December 2019 for the Mediterranean for travel industry presentations in Barcelona on 18 December, in Marseille on 19 December, and in Savona on 20 December. She officially debuted on 21 December 2019 from Savona for her inaugural cruise, calling in Marseille, Barcelona, Palma de Mallorca, Civitavecchia, and La Spezia. For her inaugural season, she continued sailing weekly voyages, with Cagliari later scheduled to replace La Spezia for summer 2020 and Palermo later replacing Cagliari in winter 2020–2021. From April 2021 to October 2021, Costa Smeralda was scheduled to cruise in the Persian Gulf from Dubai for the first time.

==== Coronavirus quarantine ====
In January 2020, the vessel and her 6,000 passengers were quarantined at the Italian port of Civitavecchia following two suspected cases of SARS-CoV-2 (coronavirus) infection related to the COVID-19 pandemic. A spokesperson from Costa Cruises stated that a 54-year-old woman aboard the cruise ship was suffering from a fever and that she and her husband were both being tested. They were later found to be uninfected by SARS-CoV-2 and passengers were allowed to go on shore the next day.

==== Incidents ====
On 22 January 2021 the ship collided with a crane in Savona, resulting in the destruction of one of the ship's lifeboats.
