= RMS Empress of Canada (1960) =

US Cruise Ship built in 1960

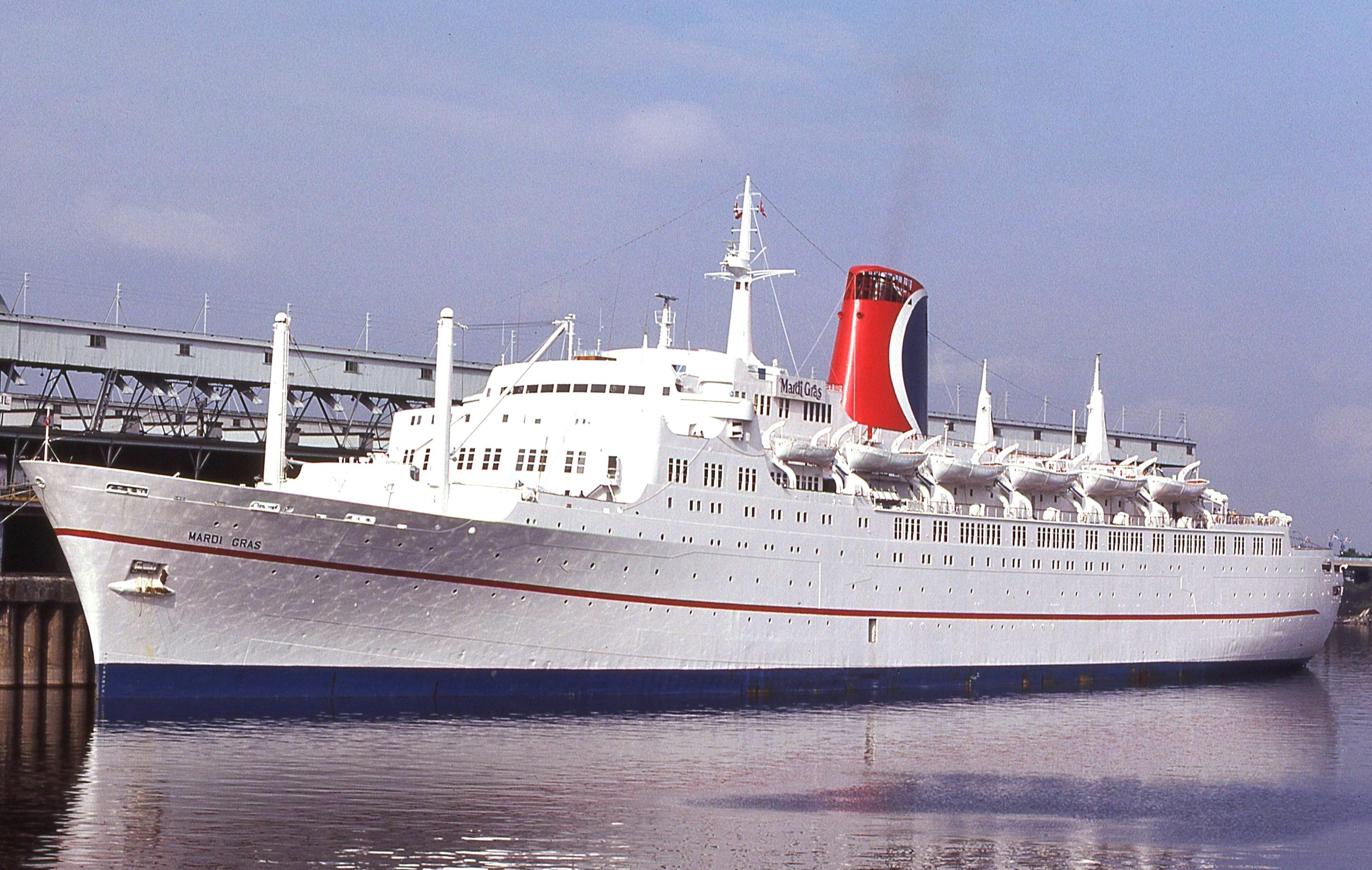
- RMS Empress of Canada as TSS Mardi Gras in Montreal, Canada, on 28 August 1979

History
- Name: 1961–1972: Empress of Canada; 1972–1993: Mardi Gras; 1993: Olympic; 1993: Star of Texas; 1994–1995: Lucky Star; 1995–2003: Apollon
- Operator: 1961–1972: Canadian Pacific; 1972–1993: Carnival; 1993–1995: Gold Star Cruises; 1995–1998: Royal Olympic; 1998–1999: Direct Cruises; 1999–2003: Royal Olympic
- Port of registry: 1961–1972: London, United Kingdom; 1972–1995: Panama, Panama; 1995–2003: Pireaus, Greece
- Builder: Vickers-Armstrongs, Walker, Newcastle upon Tyne, England
- Yard number: 171
- Launched: 10 May 1960
- Completed: March 1961
- Maiden voyage: 24 April 1961
- In service: 1961
- Out of service: 2003
- Identification: IMO number: 5103936
- Fate: Scrapped at Alang, India in 2003

General characteristics
- Class & type: Ocean Liner (later cruise ship)
- Tonnage: 27,284 GRT; (1972, 18,261 GRT)
- Length: 650 ft (198.12 m)
- Beam: 86.6 ft (26.40 m)
- Draught: 29 ft (8.84 m)
- Installed power: 30,000 shp (22,000 kW)
- Propulsion: Geared turbines, twin screw
- Speed: 20 kn (37 km/h; 23 mph)
- Capacity: As built, 192 1st class, 856 tourist class
- Crew: 470

RMS Empress of Canada was an ocean liner launched in 1960 and completed the following year by Vickers-Armstrongs of Walker, Newcastle upon Tyne, England for Canadian Pacific Steamships Ltd. This ship, the third CP vessel to be named Empress of Canada, regularly traversed the transatlantic route between Liverpool and Canada for the next decade. Although Canadian Pacific Railways was incorporated in Canada, the Atlantic (and pre-war Pacific) liners were owned and operated by the British registered subsidiary Canadian Pacific Steamships Ltd. and were always British flagged and crewed and therefore Empress of Canada was not the flagship of the Canadian Merchant Marine.

== Background ==
Following the end of World War II Canadian Pacific Steamships in 1946 resumed providing a transatlantic service utilizing the cargo liners Beaverburn and Beaverford, which were joined in 1947-50 by the refitted Empress of Canada (ex-Duchess of Richmond), Empress of France (ex-Duchess of Bedford), and then Empress of Scotland (ex-Empress of Japan). A dramatic post-war increase in immigration to Canada prompted the company to order the construction of the Empress of Britain and Empress of England which entered service in 1956-57.

The company in July 1957 commenced planning for the construction of a replacement for the Empress of Scotland, which would join the Empress of Britain and Empress of England on the transatlantic route from Liverpool to Montreal. During the months that the St. Lawrence River was frozen (typically November to April) the ships sailed from Liverpool To Saint John, New Brunswick. In addition to servicing the transatlantic trade the Empress of Canada was designed to be Canadian Pacific's premier cruise ship during the winter months and rarely sailed on the liner service in winter.

== Design ==
The Empress of Canada measured 27,284 gross register tons (GRT) with a length of 650 feet (198.12 m) and a beam of 86.6 feet (26.40 m). She was 10 feet (3.05 m) longer than her earlier sister ships due to a more curved bow and she had one foot (0.30 m) more beam. Unlike the earlier CP ships, she had a bulbous bow.

Three Foster Wheeler boilers fed steam (operating at 690 pounds per square inch, 4,800 kPa) to two Pametrada double reduction geared turbines, one for each of her two propellers. The hull was strengthened for ice and fitted with Denny-Brown stabilisers. Designed for a service speed of 20 knots (37 km/h; 23 mph), she achieved 23 kn (43 km/h; 26 mph) on her trials.

As it had proven popular with the other two new "Empresses" her aluminium funnel (which was of a different design to theirs) was placed amidships with divided uptakes, thus ensuring a 210 feet (64 m) long view through the public rooms. She had full air-conditioning with accommodation divided into 192 first class passengers and 856 tourist class. All first class cabins and 70% of tourist class had private facilities. The indoor pool, cinema and two-floor high Canada Room were shared by both classes. During the cruise seasons, the vessel operated as a one class ship. The interior was designed by Patrick McBride of McInnis, Gardiner and Paul Gell.

== Construction ==
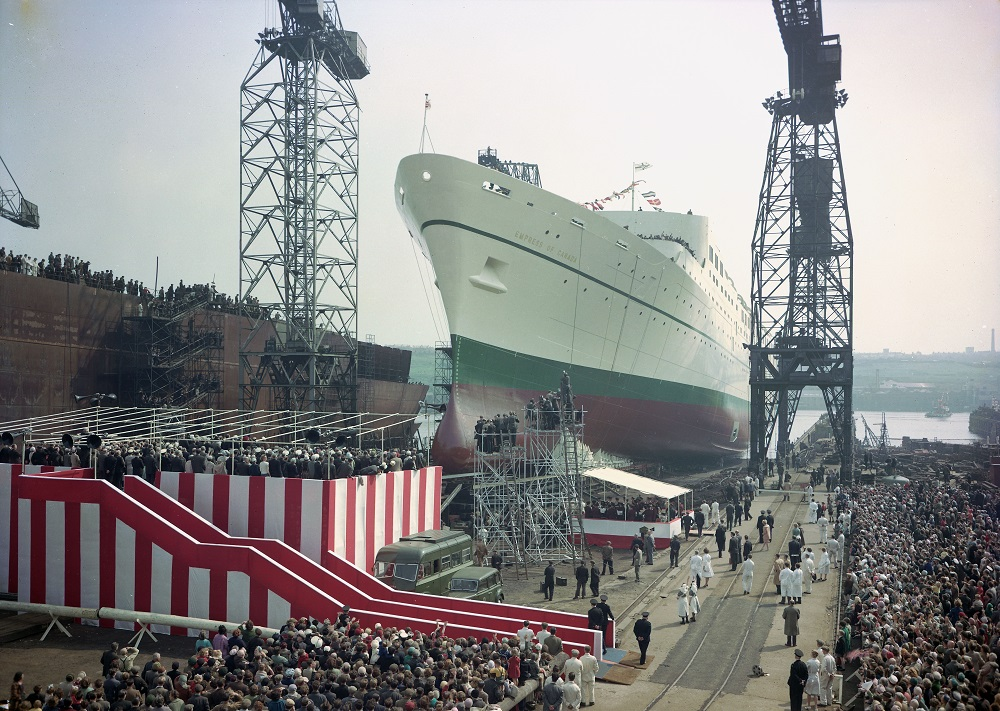
Empress of Canada being launched, Newcastle upon Tyne, 10 May 1960

The order for the vessel was announced on 3 January 1958 with the £7.5 million contract being awarded to the Vickers-Armstrong yard in Walker, Newcastle upon Tyne on the River Tyne in England. This company had built Empress of England on the same slip four years previously. The keel was laid in January 1959, the vessel's name was announced on 11 January 1960 and she was launched on 10 May 1960, one day before the French liner SS France was launched. by Olive Diefenbaker, the wife of the Canadian Prime Minister.

In February 1961 the vessel was moved into the dry dock at Swan Hunter & Wigham Richardson's yard at Wallsend. A month later, on 7 March 1961, she departed for her trials in the Firth of Clyde where on 10 March her performance was checked over the Firth of Clyde's Arran measured mile. Following the vessel's return to Vickers-Armstrong for correction of some minor defects she departed for Liverpool late on 25 March 1961, arriving two days later.

On 29 March what was subsequently to be the company's last passenger liner was commissioned into Canadian Pacific service at Liverpool. She remained at Liverpool for a month during which time she was open for inspection by the travel trade and reporters.

== Service ==
=== Canadian Pacific ===
On 24 April 1961 the Empress of Canada left Liverpool bound for Montreal on her maiden voyage, arriving on the 2 May having become the largest passenger ship to sail up the St Lawrence River. Among the 912 passengers (147 First and 765 Tourist) was author Nicholas Monsarrat.

The liner departed from Montreal on 10 November 1961 at the end of her inaugural transatlantic season bound for Liverpool, from where she departed on 12 December on her maiden crossing to New York, arriving on 19 December following a delay due to bad weather off the US coast. After making three West Indies cruises from New York, she departed on 9 February 1962 carrying 640 passengers on a 61-day, 31 port voyage of the Mediterranean. The ship then returned to the transatlantic service for the rest of the year during which she and her sister Empresses made a total of 33 round voyages between Liverpool and Montreal. On 18 February 1963 the ship departed from New York on her second Mediterranean cruise which over 61 days called at 28 ports. For this cruise which offered single-sitting dining the passenger capacity was limited to 570 guests with 70 extra catering staff employed to look after them.

The ship's first cruise from Britain departed from Liverpool on 21 December 1962 and called at Madeira, Tenerife, Sao Vincente, Las Palmas, Casablanca and Tangier, before ending at Southampton on 7 January 1963. Subsequent she departed on 10 January 1963 on a 28-day cruise of the West Indies. Following her return to Britain at the end of this cruise the Empress of Canada departed Southampton on 12 February 1963 for New York. From New York she then made another Mediterranean cruise which attracted only 369 passengers, which was lower than in previous years, causing her owners to never offer it again. The ship then returned to the transatlantic service for the rest of the year. While on a voyage from Liverpool in September of that year mechanical trouble caused the vessel to end her voyage at Quebec on 18 September 1963 where all her passengers disembarked. She then proceeded to Montreal without them, where repairs were undertaken. Her next voyage from Liverpool was disrupted by a strike of St Lawrence longshoremen, which prevented her from berthing following her arrival off Quebec on 8 October 1963. After two days at anchor she sailed for Halifax, Nova Scotia, where she discharged her passengers and cargo. On 15 October she departed for Liverpool with one First class and five Tourist class passengers, looked after by a crew of 400.

Her last transatlantic crossing from Liverpool was to St John where she arrived on 13 December 1963. She then proceeded to New York from where over the winter of 1963-64 she made six Caribbean cruises of between nine and 16 days in duration. The last of the cruises departed from New York on 27 March 1964 with 715 passengers which was the most she had ever carried up until then. On her regular transatlantic crossings she continued to carry many immigrants, an example being that 500 of the 1,006 passengers that she landed at Quebec on 12 July 1965 were immigrants. A strike had prevented her transporting them all the way to Montreal and the same for the next crossing from Liverpool. Over the winter season from 11 December 1965 to 19 March 1966 the ship made eight cruises of up to 15 days in duration.

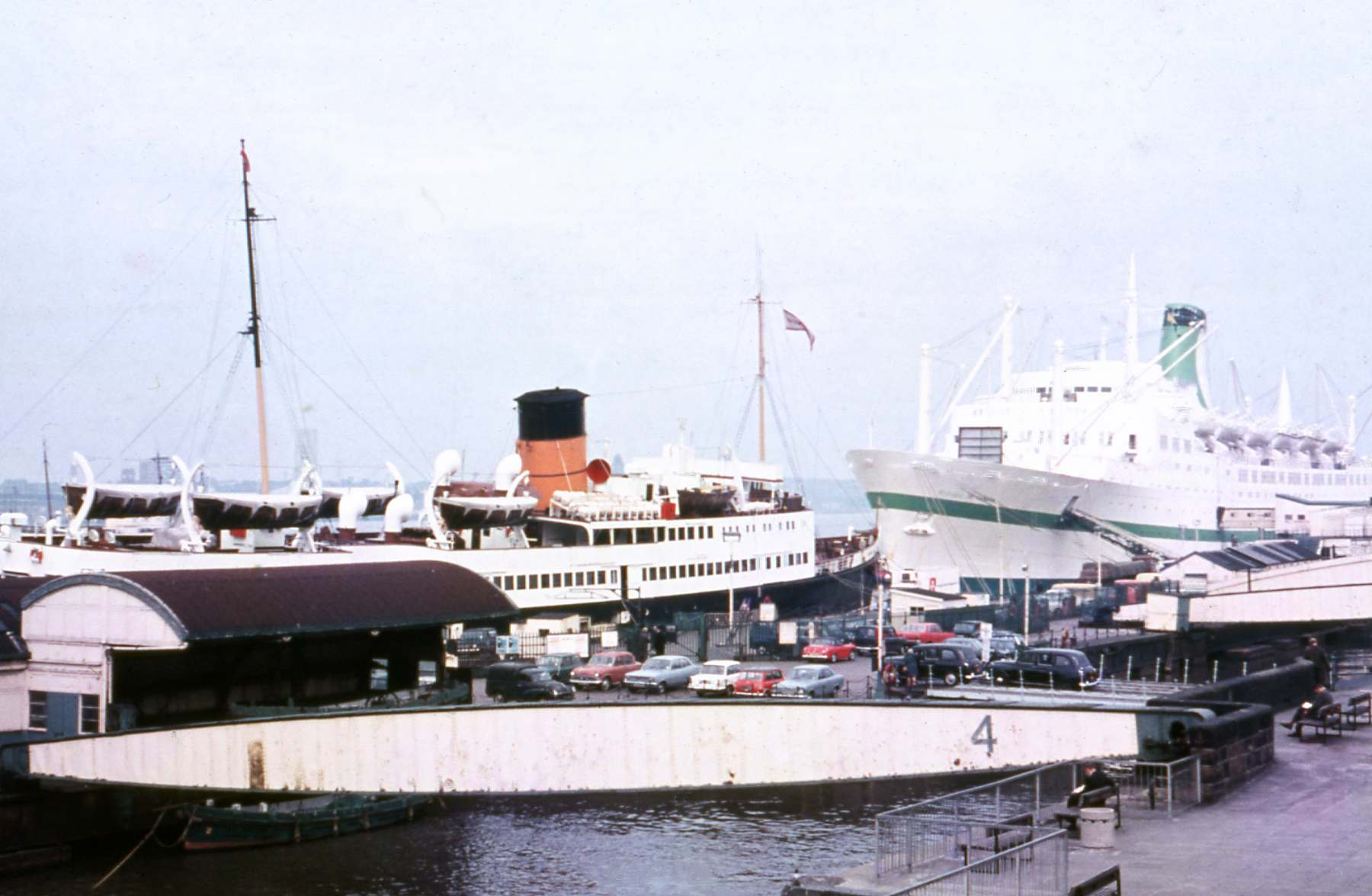
Empress of Canada at Liverpool, 1971, with TSS Manxman

Her owners had programmed a total of 23 transatlantic sailings for 1966 but a strike by the National Union of Seamen disrupted these plans. This caused her to sit after docking at Liverpool on 20 May until the 4 July when she was finally able to depart for Montreal, arriving on 11 July. The backlog of passengers due to the strike meant that the 1,087 passengers she carried on this voyage was her highest ever. Over the 1966-67 winter season she made seven cruises between 10 December 1966 and 24 March 1967. Among the 24 transatlantic sailings that she completed in 1967 she made five special Expo branded sailings from Liverpool to support Expo 67, which was being held in Montreal. Among the passengers on the Expo sailing that arrived in Montreal on 5 July 1967 were Prince Rainier and Princess Grace of Monaco and their three children.

Her last winter crossing for 1967 departed from Liverpool on 24 November 1967 to Quebec from where she made a coastal cruise to New York on 2 December from where she provided seven winter cruises, the last being completed on 23 March 1968. During one of them she ran aground at San Juan, Puerto Rico on 8 February 1968, but was pulled free with no damage. On 4 May in that same year she struck a whale which became impaled on her bow. It was dislodged by going full astern. In 1968 she made 24 transatlantic sailings followed by 16 cruises with the season being extended by her sailing from New York on 3 June 1969 direct to Liverpool, from where she made three summer cruises: 14 days to the Scandinavian capitals and the North Cape starting on 2 July, a three-day mini cruise on 1 August, and a 15-day Mediterranean trip on 19 September, interspersed with the occasional transatlantic service.

In 1968, Canadian Pacific modernised her look, changing their house flag, colour schemes and introducing a new funnel design. As the 1960s progressed transatlantic passenger crossings began to dramatically decrease due to the impact of increased air traffic following developments in aviation design which resulted in faster flights across the ocean. The decline in profitability on the transatlantic route resulted in a number of famous ships leaving or never sailing again such as the SS United States and RMS Queen Mary. As time went on Empress of Canada completed fewer and fewer trips across the Atlantic each year and by 1969 she completed only seven Atlantic voyages, compensating by spending the period between 6 December and 25 May 1970 on an extended cruise season during which she made 11 Caribbean cruises of between nine and 20 days in duration from New York and Port Everglades. On her last New York departure, she sailed on a four-day mini-cruise to Montreal on 5 April 1970, before commencing the first of the 11 Atlantic crossings that she undertook in 1970 during which the liner maintained an 82 per cent load factor. Over the winter of 1970-71 her cruise season lasted 7 December through 17 April before she returned to servicing the transatlantic trade. While one day out of Liverpool heading for Canada there was a blowback in one of her boilers which caused a fire in the boiler room at 8:15pm on 22 August 1971. It was serious enough that passengers were assembled by the life boats, but the fire was under control within ten minutes.

On 9 November 1971 Canadian Pacific unexpectedly announced that they were immediately withdrawing the Empress of Canada from service, claiming that she was becoming economically unviable. As well as the decline in transatlantic tourist numbers, immigrant patronage had collapsed as by 1970 of the 26,500 Britons who had immigrated to Canada in that year only 4,400 had travelled by sea. Also contributing to the decision had the impact of a devalued US dollar which had reduced the profitably of the cruise voyage as well as continuing labour troubles among her British crew and in Canada. The previously announced cruises were cancelled, and she departed on 17 November 1971 from Montreal under the command of Captain W.E. Williams on her last North Atlantic crossing to Liverpool with 274 (19 First and 255 Tourist) passengers aboard and 360 crew. She made her final arrival at Liverpool on 23 November 1971 having completing 121 transatlantic voyages and 82 cruises for the Canadian Pacific line, thus closing for good the Liverpool–Canada link.

She remained at Liverpool until 14 December and then sailed with a skeleton crew (of under a 100) under the command of Captain Richard Walgate for London's Tilbury docks to be laid up pending sale, arriving (for the first and only time) at her port of registry on 17 December.

=== Carnival Cruise Lines ===
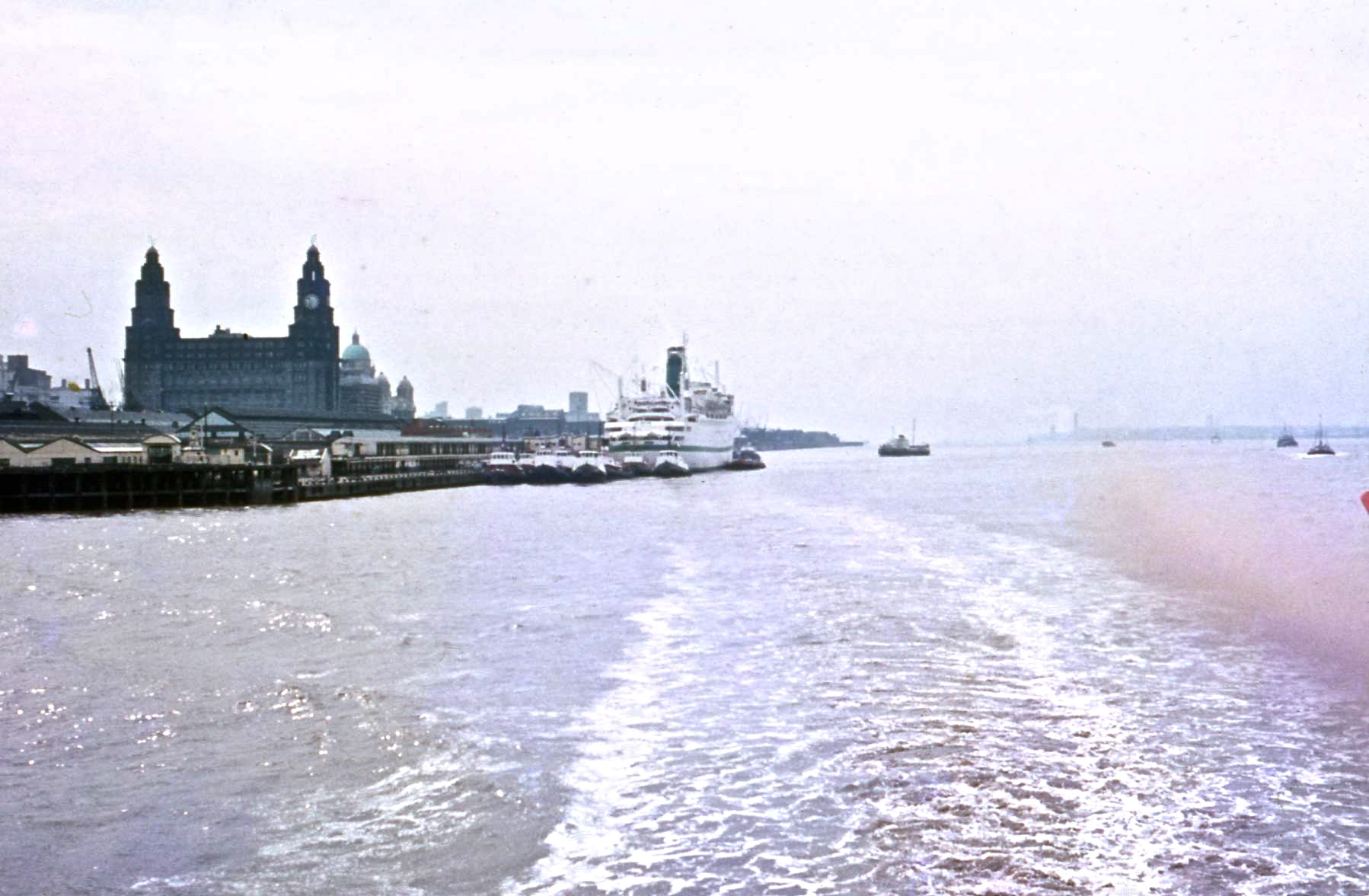
Empress of Canada and the Royal Liver Building, Liverpool, in 1971

It was thought that Empress of Canada might be sold to the Shaw Savill Line, to be renamed Dominion Monarch alongside her former fleet mate Empress of England, which had become Shaw Savill's Ocean Monarch, but the sale did not take place.

Instead she was sold in January 1972 to then-startup Carnival Cruise Lines and after being renamed Mardi Gras on 14 February 1972 she underwent a few internal changes and an update of her colour scheme. Her registration was transferred from the United Kingdom to Panama with a measurement of 18,261 GRT under Panamanian measurement rules. This saved on dock dues, while Carnival advertised what was their first ship as "27,000 tons of fun!" Her departure from Tilbury was delayed by the National Union of Seamen who picketed the ship in protest about the threat to their members of ships sailing under flags of convenience, which allowed them to pay lower wages. As a result, tug crews and lock gate men at Tilbury 'blacked' the Mardi Gras which was eventually resolved and she left Tilbury on 26 February 1972 for Miami.

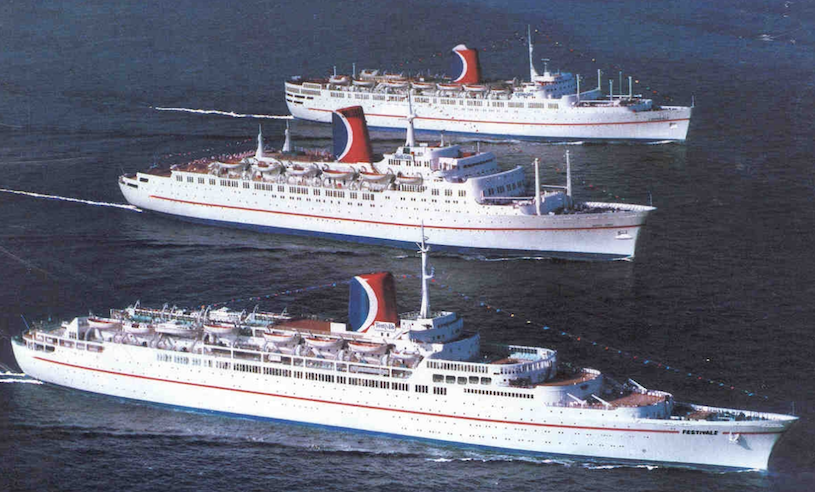
Carnival Cruise Line Fleet in 1970s. From top to bottom: Carnivale, Mardi Gras, Festivale.

Despite her age the Empress of Canada was a good choice for the new company as she had been well-maintained and was in better condition than a number of the vessels offering cruises from Miami. As the newly established company was in a very weak financial position the ship soon after departed Miami on 11 March 1972 with 530 passengers and 200 crew on board, on her first cruise without any major refurbishments in order to bring in some income. At that time she was the largest passenger ship using the port of Miami and fully laden her draft caused her to run aground as she departed. After twenty-four hours of attempting to free her, the passengers were disembarked. After being refloated and being found to be watertight the passengers rejoined the ship and the cruise continued. This mishap caused some competitors calling the vessel "Mardi Gras On The Rocks".

Initially Carnival was constantly financially struggling but the company's strategy of marketing the array of activities and entertainment available on board the ship, rather than its destination eventually caught on, so that by 1975 Carnival was making a profit. By 1975 business had improved to such an extent that the company purchased her near sister Empress of Britain, which was renamed Carnivale.

In August 1979 the ship undertook a cruise to Canada and made her first visit to Montreal in eight years. A second Canadian cruise and which was her last in Canadian waters was undertaken in 1980. Early in 1982 she was given an extensive refurbishment. From the end of 1990 onwards she began operating out of Port Canaveral.

=== Subsequent ship lines ===
By 1993 Carnival wanted to update their fleet by ordering new tonnage so she was sold to Epirotiki in that year, and was initially renamed Olympic. In that same year she was chartered to Gold Star Cruises, based in Galveston, Texas, who renamed her Star of Texas. She departed on 30 October 1993 on her first of the ten weekly sailings that the company operated each week consisting of four six-hour cruises, and six “night-club” cruises. The company soon found itself in financial difficulties, and the ship was relocated to Miami, where she provided short cruises under the name Lucky Star. Gold Star Cruises stopped operating in December 1994 and the ship was laid up in the Bahamas for a short period before sailing to Piraeus, where she arrived on 10 May 1995. In 1995 Epirotiki merged its operations with Sun Line, creating a new company named Royal Olympic Cruise Lines and the vessel was renamed Apollon. For a while she sailed for this line before being chartered for five years by Direct Cruises (division of Direct Holidays) for voyages around the United Kingdom. In preparation the vessel was given a multi-million dollar refurbishment at the Skaramanga shipyard, prior to departing from Piraeus for Liverpool. However while enroute she had to be diverted to Avonmouth for engine repairs which meant that it was not until 30 May 1998 that she reached Liverpool. For her charterers the vessel operated cruises from Liverpool, Greenock and Newcastle upon Tyne.

Direct Holidays was purchased by the tour operator Airtours in 1999. Coincidentally perhaps, around this time Carnival acquired a share of Airtours plc (around 23%) – though primarily to secure distribution of the Carnival brand through the tour operator. This was a relatively short lived liaison. A quid-pro-quo agreement was made between Royal Olympic and Airtours to scrap the Apollon charter agreement and in 2000 all voyages planned for the vessel were cancelled and she was returned to Greece where she was laid up. This agreement saw the Airtours vessel MS Seawing transferred from Airtours Sun Cruises (the Airtours in-house cruise division) management to Royal Olympic under a third party management agreement. This agreement also included an option to purchase at the end of the newly agreed management deal.

In May 2001 the Apollon was put back in service for three- and four-day cruises out of Piraeus due to the late delivery of Olympic Explorer. She operated alongside the new Olympic Countess with a break as an accommodation ship in July 2001 for delegates and press attending the G8 summit being held at Genoa. By 2003 the aging vessel was in need of a complete refurbishment so to avoid this expense she was laid up in that same year. Taking advantage of higher prices currently being offered for scrap metal she was sold for scrap on 16 September 2003, having been in service for 42 years. On 12 November the former Empress of Canada departed Piraeus for breaking up at Alang in India, where she arrived on 4 December 2003.

In February 2021 Carnival Cruises announced that the first Carnival Excel-class ship will bear the Mardi Gras name. This ship entered service in July 2021.

A curved bulkhead wall made from mahogany and featuring 24 panes of glass that was part of the ship's original Mayfair Lounge and later the casino starting from Carnival Cruise Lines and onward was salvaged by passenger ship historian Peter Knego when the ship was scrapped in 2004. The wall was later sold to Carnival Cruise Lines and has since been installed as part of The Golden Jubilee Lounge for the second Carnival Excel-class ship, Carnival Celebration.
