= Costa Toscana =

Biggest Excellence-class ship operated by Costa Cruises

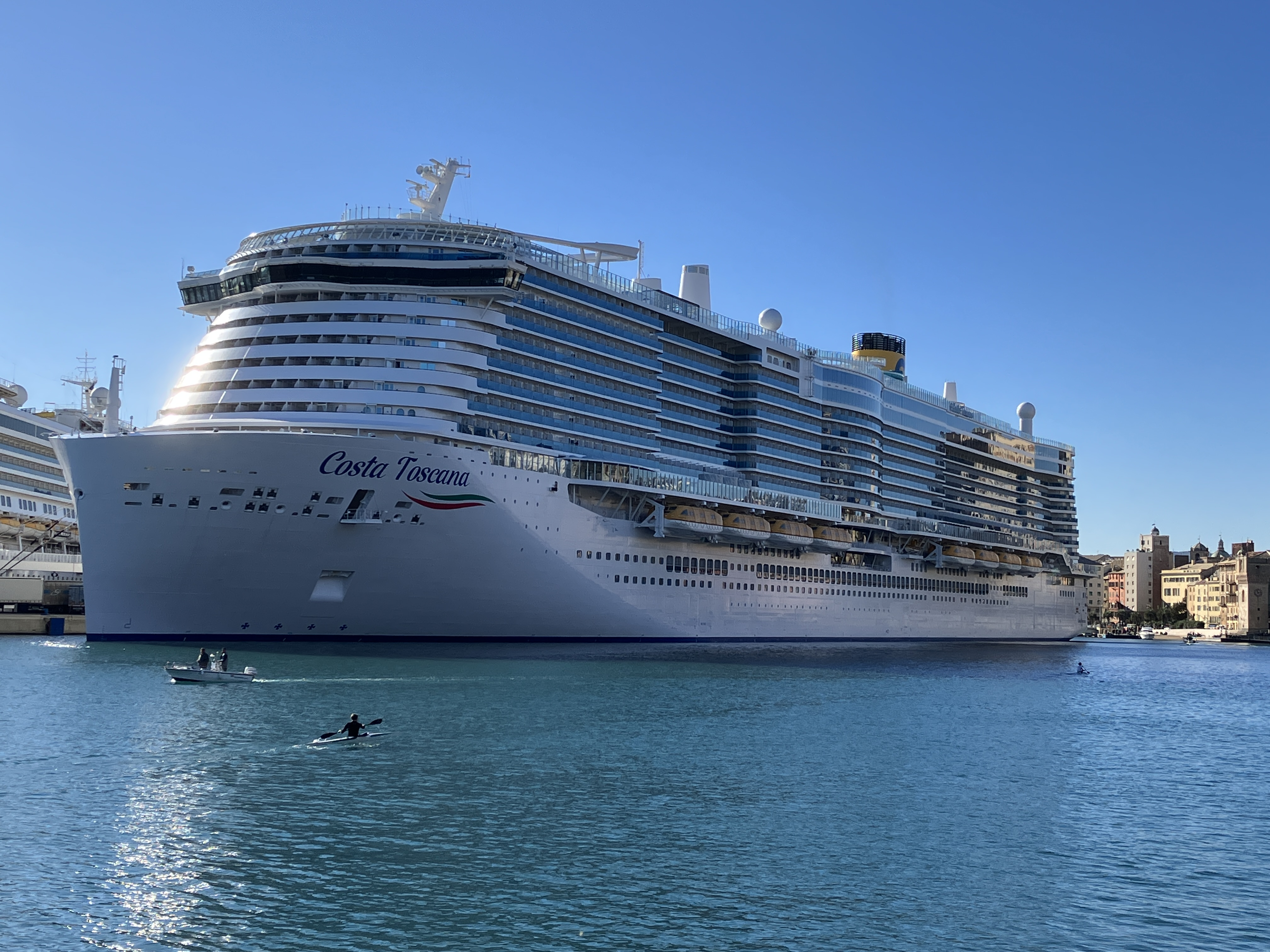
- Costa Toscana in Savona

History

Italy
- Name: Costa Toscana
- Owner: Carnival Corporation ltd.
- Operator: Costa Cruises
- Port of registry: Genova, Italy
- Ordered: 16 December 2015
- Builder: Meyer Turku
- Yard number: 1395
- Launched: 15 January 2021
- Acquired: 2 December 2021
- In service: 2022—present
- Identification: Call sign: IBIM; IMO number: 9781891; MMSI number: 247431200
- Status: In service
- Notes: Twelfth-largest cruise ship in the world

General characteristics
- Class & type: Excellence-class cruise ship
- Tonnage: 186,364 GT
- Length: 337 m (1,105 ft 8 in)
- Beam: 42 m (137 ft 10 in)
- Height: 72 m (236 ft)
- Draught: 9 m (29 ft 6 in)
- Depth: 11.8 m (38 ft 9 in)
- Decks: 20
- Installed power: 4 x MaK 16M46DF
- Speed: 22 knots (41 km/h; 25 mph) (Service speed)
- Capacity: 6,554 passengers
- Crew: 1,645

Costa Toscana is an Excellence-class cruise ship currently operated by the Italian cruise line Costa Cruises, a subsidiary of Carnival Corporation & plc. The ship was built in 2021. Costa Toscana has a sister ship, Costa Smeralda, which had been delivered in 2019. At 186,364 gross tonnage (GT), she is the largest ship commissioned for and to ever operate for Costa, and the 12th-largest cruise ship in the world, as of 2025.
