= AIDAcosma =

Cruise ship

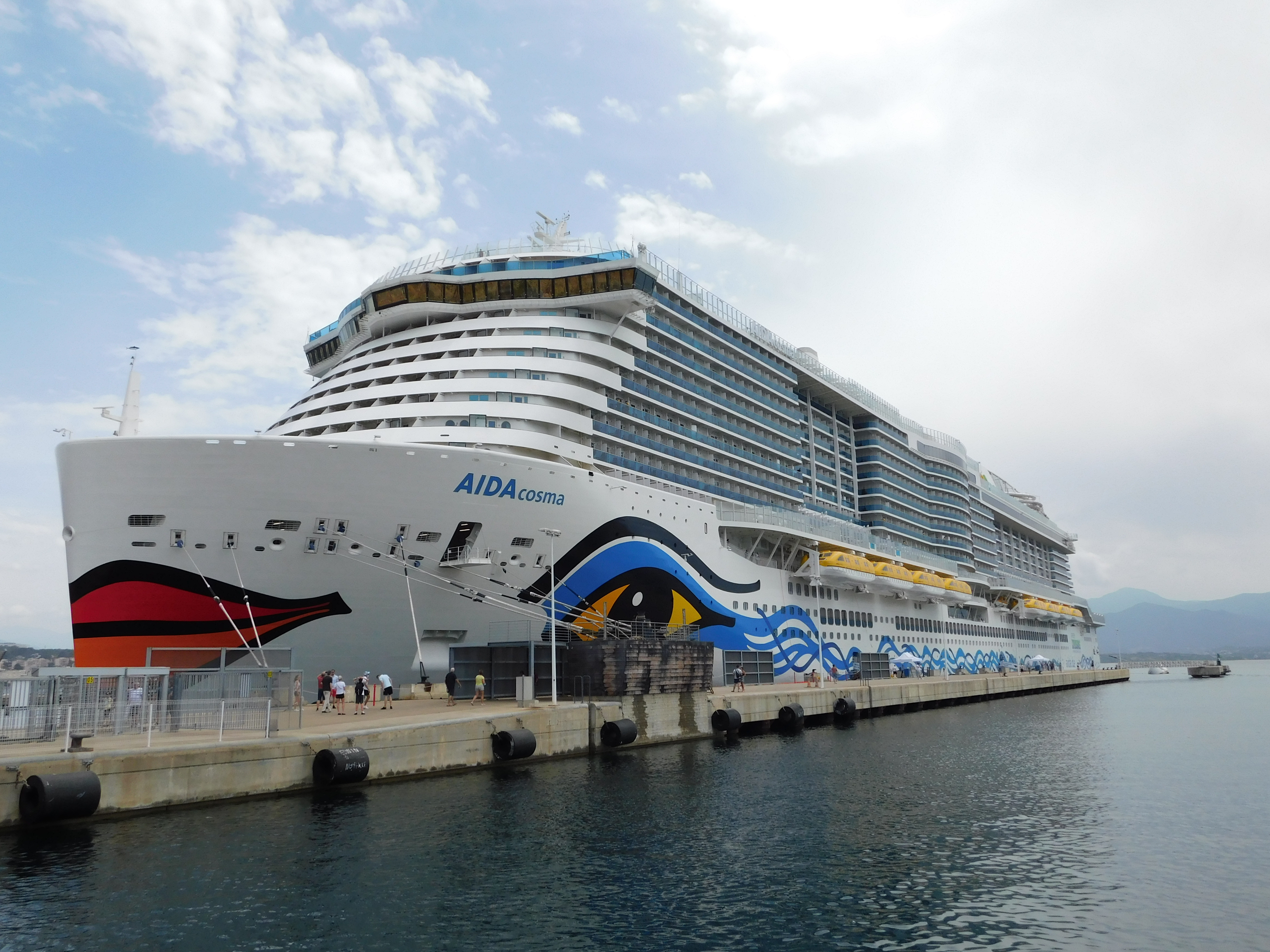
- AIDAcosma in the port of Ajaccio, Corsica in France on 25 May 2022

History

Italy
- Name: AIDAcosma
- Operator: AIDA Cruises
- Port of registry: Genoa, (Italy)
- Builder: Meyer Werft
- Launched: 10 July 2021
- Christened: 9 April 2022
- Completed: 2021
- Maiden voyage: 26 February 2022
- In service: 2022–present
- Identification: IMO number: 9781865; MMSI number: 247389200; Callsign: IBUK
- Status: In service

General characteristics
- Class & type: Excellence-class cruise ship
- Tonnage: 183,858 GT; 17,986 DWT
- Displacement: 87,306 tons
- Length: 337 m (1,105 ft 8 in)
- Beam: 42 m (137 ft 10 in)
- Height: 69.3 m (227 ft 4 in)
- Draught: 8.8 m (28 ft 10 in)
- Decks: 16
- Speed: 17 knots (31 km/h; 20 mph)
- Capacity: 5,252 (double occupancy); 6,654 (max passengers)
- Crew: 1,646

AIDAcosma is the second and final Helios-class cruise ship built by Meyer Werft GmbH at Papenburg, Germany under contract from Carnival Corporation for AIDA Cruises. The second of the new Excellence-class ships, she was launched on 10 July 2021 and delivered on December 21, 2021.

She has one sister ship, AIDAnova, delivered on 12 December 2018.
