= Excellence-class cruise ship =

Carnival Cruise Lines ship class

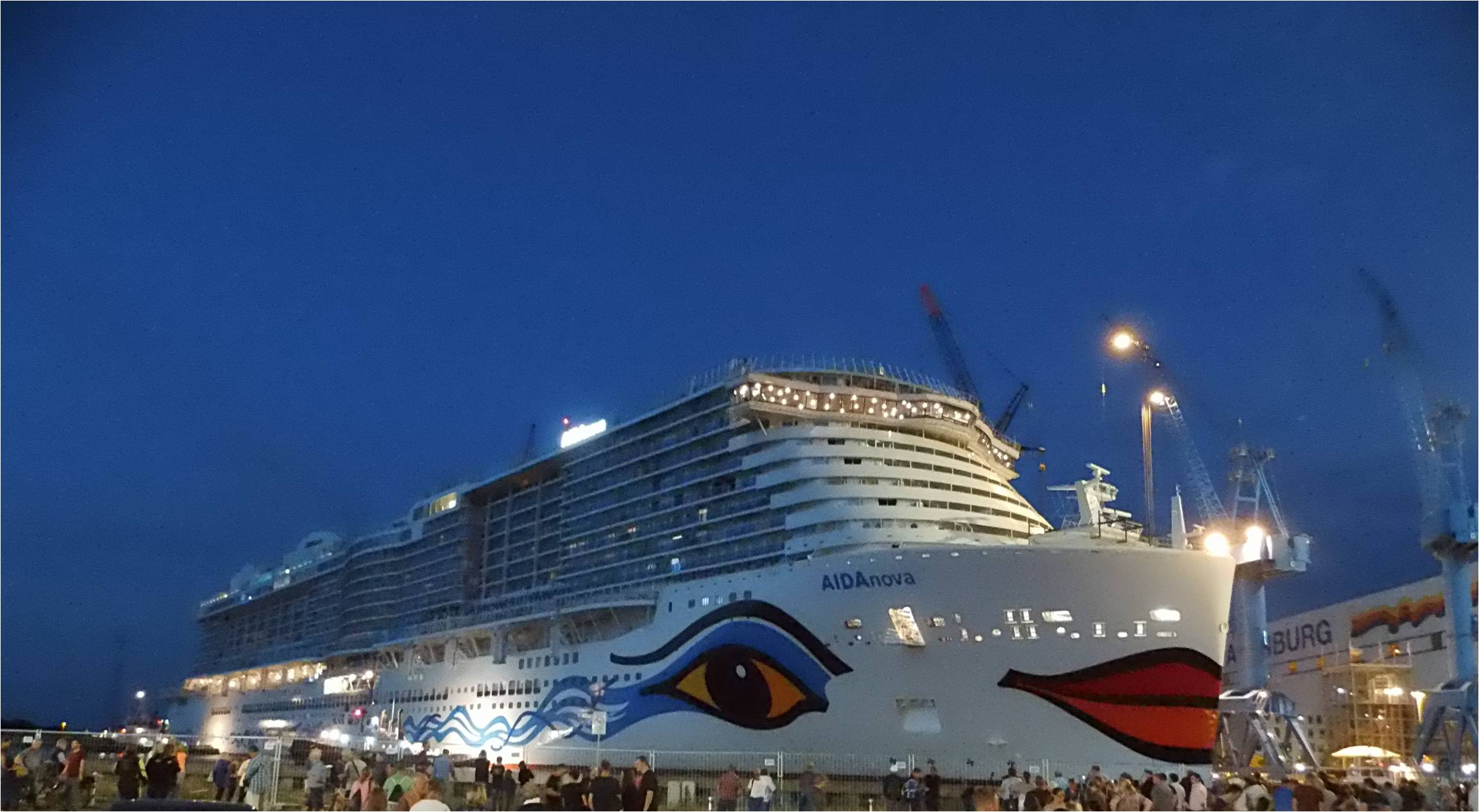
- AIDAnova, the first ship in the class, in 2018

Class overview
- Builders: Meyer Werft, Papenburg, Germany; Meyer Turku, Turku, Finland
- Operators: AIDA Cruises; Costa Cruises; P&O Cruises; Carnival Cruise Line
- Preceded by: Carnival Cruise Line and Costa: Vista class; P&O Cruises: Royal class; AIDA Cruises: Hyperion class
- Succeeded by: Carnival Cruise Line: Ace-class cruise ship
- Subclasses: Helios class; Excel class
- Built: 2017–2028 (planned)
- In service: 2018 – present
- Planned: 11 (13 rumored)
- Building: 1
- Completed: 9
- Active: 9

General characteristics
- Type: Cruise ship
- Tonnage: 183,900 GT
- Displacement: 80,000 tons
- Length: 1,115 ft (340 m)
- Height: 69.3 m (227 ft 4 in) – 72 m (236 ft)
- Installed power: 4x MaK 16VM46DF, 57.2 MW total
- Propulsion: Two ABB azimuth thrusters, 37 MW total

The Excellence class, including the sub-classes Helios and XL or Excel, is a class of cruise ships ordered by Carnival Corporation & plc for its subsidiary brands AIDA Cruises, Costa Cruises, P&O Cruises and Carnival Cruise Line. The ships are being constructed by Meyer Werft at their shipyard in Papenburg, Germany, and Meyer Turku at their shipyard in Turku, Finland. The first, AIDAnova, entered service for AIDA Cruises in 2018.

== History ==
In March 2015, Carnival Corporation entered into a strategic partnership with Meyer Werft to build new ships between 2018 and 2022. In June 2015, four ships were ordered for delivery between 2019 and 2020. In September 2016, three more ships were ordered for Carnival Cruise Line and P&O Cruises for delivery in 2020 and 2022. In February 2024, Carnival Cruise Line placed an order for another Excellence class ship for delivery in 2027.

The Excellence class are the first cruise ships in the world to be dual fueled by liquefied natural gas (LNG) and traditional fuel oil, which is intended to make them more environmentally friendly than traditional, diesel-powered ships. Each ship is expected to cost $950 million.

The first four ships in the class suffered delivery delays. The delays of AIDAnova, Costa Smeralda and Mardi Gras were attributed to the ships being the first to be fueled by LNG, design complexities, difficulties coordinating subcontractors, and the large size of the ships. The delay of Iona was due to a temporary suspension of operations by P&O Cruises, and slower construction progress, in response to the COVID-19 pandemic. Mardi Gras was later delayed until 2021, also due to the pandemic.

== Ships ==
Ship	Subclass	Built	Operator	Builder	Gross tonnage	Flag	IMO number	Notes	Image	Newbuilding no.
AIDAnova	Helios class	2018	AIDA Cruises	Meyer Werft	183,858	Italy	9781865	World's first LNG-powered cruise ship.		S.696
Costa Smeralda	Excel class	2019	Costa Cruises	Meyer Turku	185,010	Italy	9781889			NB 1394
Iona	Excel class	2020	P&O Cruises	Meyer Werft	184,089	United Kingdom	9826548			S.710
Mardi Gras	Excel class	2020	Carnival Cruise Line	Meyer Turku	180,800	Bahamas	9837444			NB 1396
AIDAcosma	Helios class	2021	AIDA Cruises	Meyer Werft	183,900	Italy	9781877	Originally planned for 2020.		S.709
Costa Toscana	Excel class	2021	Costa Cruises	Meyer Turku	186,364	Italy	9781891	Originally planned for 2020.		NB 1395
Carnival Celebration	Excel class	2022	Carnival Cruise Line	Meyer Turku	183,521	Bahamas	9837456	Construction started on January 13, 2021.		NB 1397
Arvia	Excel class	2022	P&O Cruises	Meyer Werft	185,581	United Kingdom	9849693	Construction started on February 22, 2021.		S.716
Carnival Jubilee	Excel class	2023	Carnival Cruise Line	Meyer Werft	183,521	Bahamas	9851737	Originally ordered for AIDA Cruises. Construction started on March 18, 2022.		S.717
Carnival Festivale	Excel class	2027	Carnival Cruise Line	Meyer Werft	183,521	Panama		Order announced February 13, 2024. First order by the Carnival Corporation in five years		S.724
Carnival Tropicale	Excel class	2028	Carnival Cruise Line	Meyer Werft	183,521	Panama		Order announced March 26, 2024. construction started on 10 September 2026		S.725
