= Meyer Turku =

Finnish shipbuilding company

Meyer Turku Oy
- Formerly: STX Finland Oy
- Type: Osakeyhtiö
- Industry: Shipbuilding
- Predecessor: Wärtsilä Marine
- Founded: 7 November 1989 as Masa-Yards Turku New Shipyard
- Founders: Finnish state Martin Saarikangas; Ted Arison
- Headquarters: Perno, Turku, Finland
- Key people: Casimir Lindholm (CEO)
- Revenue: ▲€1,826,860,000 (2024); ▲€1,432,472,000 (2023)
- Operating income: ▲€135,190,000 (2024); ▼–€37,976,000 (2023)
- Number of employees: 2,356 (12/2024)
- Subsidiaries: Piikkio Works Oy; Shipbuilding Completion Oy; ENG'nD Oy
- Website: meyerturku.fi

Meyer Turku Oy is a Finnish shipbuilding company located in Turku, Finland. The main products are cruise ships and cruiseferries.

The shipbuilding facility is Perno shipyard in Turku. The yard area is 144 hectares and it is equipped with a 365-metre-long dry dock and two bridge cranes with capacities of 600 and 1,200 tonnes. Additionally, the company owns subsidiaries Shipbuilding Completion Oy, Rauma-based ENG'nD Oy and Piikkiö-located cabin builder Piikkio Works Oy.

The company was founded in November 1989 under name Masa-Yards Oy to continue operations of the previously bankrupted Wärtsilä Marine. The heritage, however, goes back to 1737 when industrial shipbuilding was first started in Turku. The present company is owned and managed by the Meyer family associated with the German shipbuilder Meyer Werft.

== Company ==
=== Perno shipyard ===
Aerial views of Perno shipyard, Turku, Finland with Icon of the Seas and Carnival Celebration cruise ships under construction, year 2022.

The main facility is Turku shipyard that is situated in Perno, Turku. The yard area is 144 hectares and it is equipped with a dry dock that is 365 metres long, 80 metres wide and 10 metres deep. The main crane is a gantry crane with 1,200 tonnes capacity.

=== Piikkio Works ===
Ship cabins are built in a separate factory in Piikkiö, Kaarina under subsidiary Piikkio Works Oy. The company employs 134 people and its turnover was €38.9 million in 2014.

=== Shipbuilding Completion ===
Shipbuilding Completion designs and builds ship interior outfitting and operates in Perno shipyard premises. The company's turnover was €13.3 million in 2015 when it employed 16 people (2014).

=== ENG'nD ===
ENG'nD is an engineering company that is specialised on piping and electrical wiring system design. The company is based in Rauma and its turnover was €2.7 million in 2015.

== History ==
=== Heritage ===
History of industrial shipbuilding in Turku goes back to 1737, when the Swedish king gave to Turku merchants Esaias Wechter and Henric Rungeen a licence for shipbuilding next to river Aura. They recruited Scottish master shipbuilder Robert Fithie to lead the shipbuilding projects. After Wechter and Rungeen discontinued shipbuilding, Fithie founded a new company which later became known as Turku Old Shipyard. The company was taken over by William Crichton who incorporated it into his own company W:m Crichton & C:o in 1882. The main customer was Imperial Russian Navy which ordered a number of torpedo boats and other vessels. Crichton's company bankrupted in 1913, after which local businessmen Ernst and Magnus Dahlström founded Ab Crichton to continue shipbuilding. As all the Finnish shipbuilders, Ab Crichton suffered of low order intake at the early 1920s; It merged with its competitor and neighbour Ab Vulcan in 1924. The new company name became Ab Crichton-Vulcan Oy and its manager became Allan Staffans. It got large orders from the Finnish Navy, most significant ones being coastal defence ships Väinämöinen and Ilmarinen. By time Crichton-Vulcan grew the biggest shipbuilding company of Finland. The major owner became Helsinki-based Kone- ja Siltarakennus which also owned the Hietalahti shipyard. In 1935 Kone- ja Siltarakennus was taken over by Karelian iron mill Wärtsilä which was led by energetic Wilhelm Wahlforss. Most of the ships produced by Wärtsilä Crichton-Vulcan were exported to Soviet Union but the importance of western market increased by time. The historical name Crichton-Vulcan was replaced by Wärtsilä Turku Shipyard in 1966.

=== Moving to Perno ===
The old yard area at river Aura was surrounded by the growing city and when Tankmar Horn became manager of Wärtsilä in the early 1970s, he initiated building a completely new yard out of the urban area. Construction of Perno yard began in 1975 and operations were gradually moved from river Aura to the new premises. Wärtsilä's reputation as cruise ship builder grew and the proportion of freight ships decreased gradually. In 1987 Wärtsilä put together its shipbuilding operations with Valmet creating Wärtsilä Marine. Due to collapse of Soviet exports, errors in price calculations and other reasons, Wärtsilä Marine bankrupted in October 1989.

=== Foundation and Norwegian ownership ===
The company was founded as Masa-Yards Turku New Shipyard in November 1989 to continue operations of the previously bankrupted Wärtsilä Marine. The founders were Helsinki shipyard manager Martin Saarikangas, state of Finland and companies of which ships were laying unfinished at Wärtsilä Marine yards. Both the state and the shipowners wanted to sell the shares as soon as the operations were restarted and subsequently the company was taken over by Norwegian Kværner in 1990. By 2002 the major owner of Kværner became another Norwegian company Aker which already owned the Finnish Rauma shipyard. In 2004 the shipbuilding activities were put under the same organisation Aker Yards. In 2008 Korean STX Corporation took over Aker Yards.

=== STX Finland ===
The Korean owner renamed the European organisation STX Europe and its Finnish branch became STX Finland. Perno yard was specialised on large cruise ships and cruise ferries with a high degree of processing. Other branches were shipyards in Rauma and Helsinki and naval engineering company Aker Arctic.

STX fell into a financial crisis and at the end of 2012 asked for financial support from the Finnish government in order to receive a large cruise ship order from RCCL. The government rejected this, because the overall project financing was not on a plausible basis. STX decided to build the ship at its French shipyard in Saint-Nazaire, where the government was more generous. The loss of such a valuable order in a difficult economic situation made the future of Finnish shipbuilding uncertain. The Finnish government started a secret operation to find more stable operators for the shipyards in order to save the industry in the country. The Rauma shipyard was closed in 2013 and the ground was sold to town of Rauma; the yard is now operated by Rauma Marine Constructions. The sole owner of Helsinki shipyard became Russian USC, which earlier owned half of it. In 2014 the new operator for Turku yard became Meyer Werft under name Meyer Turku. At the beginning the state was the joint owner until Meyer Werft bought the rest of the shares.

== List of ships built or on order ==
Ship name	Client	Year	Type	Gross tonnage	Yard number	IMO number	Status	Notes	Image	Ref
Mein Schiff 4	TUI Cruises	2015	Cruise ship	99,526 GT	1384	9678408	In service			
Mein Schiff 5	TUI Cruises	2016	Cruise ship	98,785 GT	1389	9753193	In service			
Megastar	Tallink	2017	Cruiseferry	49,134 GT	1391	9773064	In service			
Mein Schiff 6	TUI Cruises	2017	Cruise ship	98,811 GT	1390	9753208	In service			
Mein Schiff 1	TUI Cruises	2018	Cruise ship	111,500 GT	1392	9783564	In service			
Mein Schiff 2	TUI Cruises	2019	Cruise ship	111,500 GT	1393	9783576	In service			
Costa Smeralda	Costa Crociere	2019	Cruise ship	185,010 GT	1394	9781889	In service	Excellence-class		
Mardi Gras	Carnival Cruise Lines	2020	Cruise ship	181,808 GT	1396	9837444	In service	Excellence-class		
Costa Toscana	Costa Crociere	2021	Cruise ship	183,900 GT	1395	9781891	In service	Excellence-class		
Carnival Celebration	Carnival Cruise Lines	2022	Cruise ship	183,900 GT	1397	9837456	In service	Excellence-class		
Icon of the Seas	Royal Caribbean International	2023	Cruise ship	248,663 GT	1400	9829930	In service	Icon-class		
Mein Schiff 7	TUI Cruises	2024	Cruise ship	111,500 GT	1404	9851189	In service			
Star of the Seas	Royal Caribbean International	2025	Cruise ship	250,800 GT	1401	9829942	In service	Icon-class		
Karhu	Finnish Border Guard	2026 (planned)	Offshore patrol vessel		1406	4772041	Under construction	Letter of intent for two vessels signed on 16 August 2021.		
Legend of the Seas	Royal Caribbean International	2026	Cruise ship	250,800 GT	1402	9888560	In service	Icon-class		
	Finnish Border Guard	2026 (planned)	Offshore patrol vessel		1407	4772053	Under construction			
Hero of the Seas	Royal Caribbean International	2027 (planned)	Cruise ship	250,800 GT			Under construction	Icon-class		
	Royal Caribbean International	2028 (planned)	Cruise ship	250,800 GT			Ordered	Icon-class		
	Royal Caribbean International	2029 (planned)	Cruise ship	250,800 GT			Ordered	Icon-class		
	Royal Caribbean International	2030 (planned)	Cruise ship	250,800 GT			Ordered	Icon-class		

more ships for Royal Caribbean until 2036

== Bibliography ==
- von Knorring, Nils (1995). Aurajoen veistämöt ja telakat [Boat- and Shipyards along River Aura] (in Finnish). Espoo, Finland: Schildts Förlags Ab. ISBN 951-50-0735-6.
