= AIDAnova =

Cruise ship

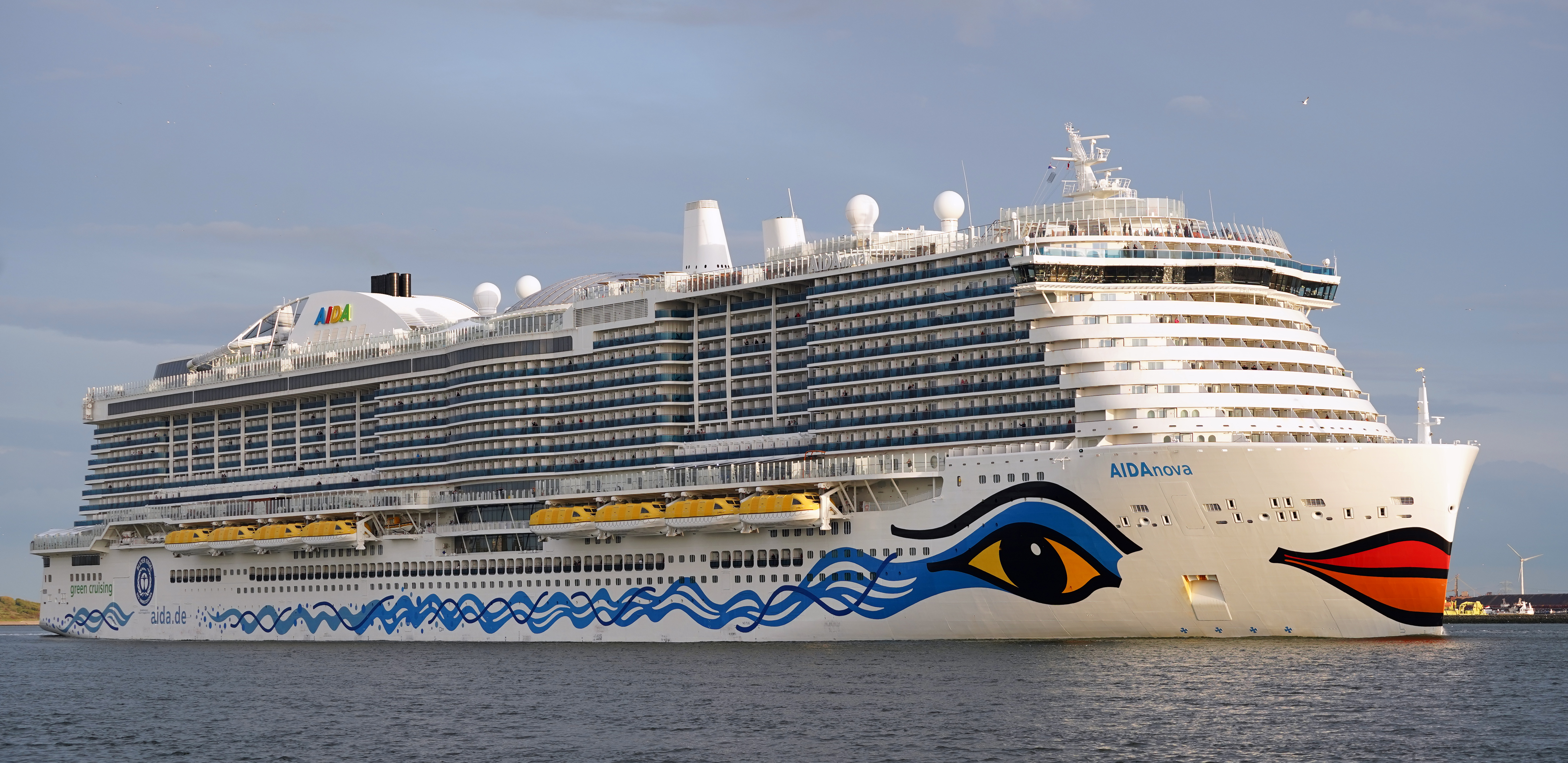
- AIDAnova near Hook of Holland, 2024

History

Italy
- Name: AIDAnova
- Owner: Carnival Corporation & plc
- Operator: AIDA Cruises
- Port of registry: Genoa, Italy
- Builder: Meyer Werft
- Laid down: 6 September 2017
- Launched: 21 August 2018
- Christened: 31 August 2018
- Completed: 12 December 2018
- In service: 2018–present
- Identification: IMO number: 9781865; MMSI number: 247389200; Callsign: IBUK
- Status: In service

General characteristics
- Class & type: Excellence-class cruise ship
- Tonnage: 183,858 GT; 17,986 DWT
- Displacement: 87,306 tons
- Length: 337 m (1,105 ft 8 in)
- Beam: 42 m (137 ft 10 in)
- Height: 69.3 m (227 ft 4 in)
- Draught: 8.8 m (28 ft 10 in)
- Decks: 16
- Speed: 17 knots (31 km/h; 20 mph)
- Capacity: 5,252 (double occupancy); 6,654 (max passengers)
- Crew: 1,646

AIDAnova is a cruise ship built by Meyer Werft GmbH in Papenburg, Germany under contract from Carnival Corporation for AIDA Cruises. The first of the new Excellence-class ships, she was launched on 21 August 2018 and delivered on 12 December 2018.

She has one sister ship, AIDAcosma, delivered on 21 December 2021.

== General information ==
The ship is the first cruise ship in the world that can operate completely using liquefied natural gas (LNG), like the cruiseferry Viking Grace.

AIDAnova has four dual-fuel hybrid engines, which can use either LNG or traditional fuel oil.

Her delivery was marred by delays; complications arose from her engineering being the first-of-its-kind for a ship of her scale. In October 2018, the first postponement was announced, cancelling all scheduled preview cruises. A small fire had also broken out during its construction in the shipyard, delaying her sea trials. Her maiden voyage was then scheduled for 2 December 2018 from Hamburg. Later, in November 2018, a second postponement was announced. Her sea trials were scheduled to begin on 16 November 2018 and all work was scheduled to be completed by 30 November 2018. AIDAnova was delivered on 12 December 2018 and her maiden voyage was on 19 December 2018 for a seven-day cruise from Santa Cruz de Tenerife around the Canary Islands and Madeira.

As of September 2019, AIDAnova was sailing on cruises around the Mediterranean and Canary Islands. In 2022 it has been sailing in Northern Europe, the port of Nordfjordeid in Norway is visited on every cruise.

The ship has the option to plugin whilst in port (and turnoff the engines) an option known as cold ironing.
