= SS Oriana (1959) =

Last of the Orient Steam Navigation Company's ocean liners

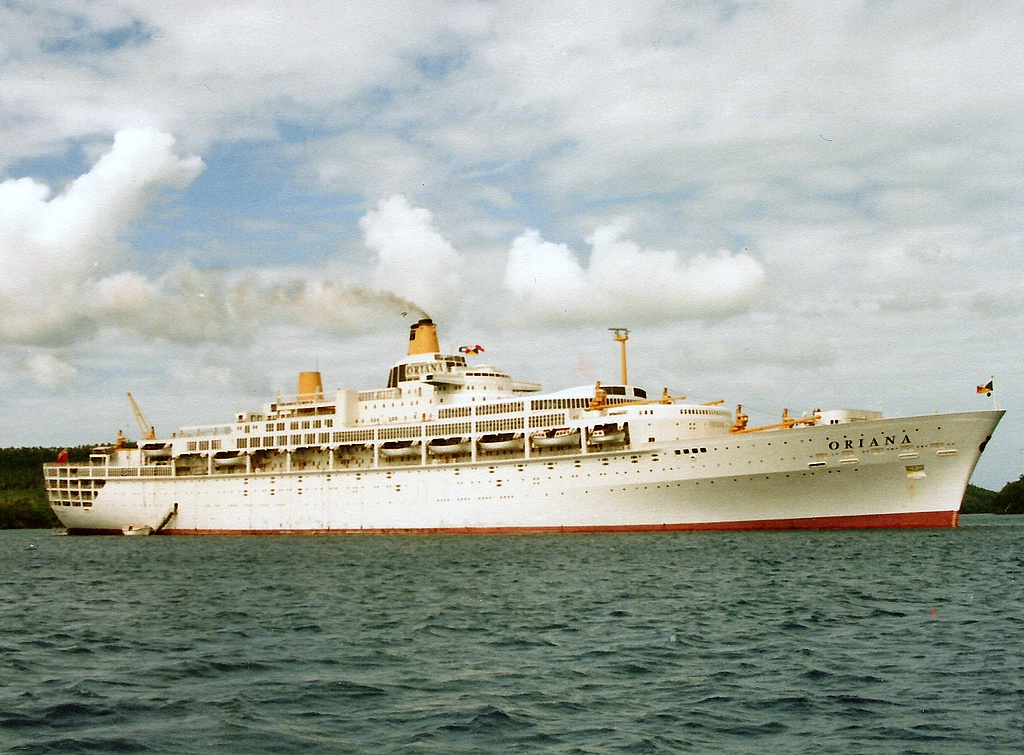
- Oriana in Vava'u, Tonga

History
- Name: Oriana: 1960–2005
- Owner: Orient Steam Navigation Company: 1960–1966; P&O: 1966–1986
- Operator: 1960–1966, P&O-Orient Lines. 1966–1973, P&O Line, 1973–1986 P&O Cruises
- Port of registry: London United Kingdom
- Route: Southampton-Sydney via Suez, transpacific to US West Coast, occasional return via Panama Canal (1973 Cruising)
- Ordered: 1956
- Builder: Vickers-Armstrong
- Cost: £12.5 million (1956) (equivalent to £365.8 million in 2024)
- Yard number: 1061
- Laid down: 18 September 1957
- Launched: 3 November 1959
- Completed: 1960
- Maiden voyage: 3 December 1960
- In service: 1960–1986
- Out of service: 27 March 1986
- Identification: Call sign: GVSN; IMO number: 5264742
- Fate: Converted into a hotel ship in 1986. Service ended after ship sank at her berth after a storm in 2004 and was scrapped post refloating.

General characteristics
- Tonnage: 41,910 gross register tons
- Length: 804ft (245.1m)
- Beam: (moulded) 97.1ft (30.5m)
- Draught: 32ft
- Installed power: 80,000 horsepower
- Propulsion: Two sets of Pametrada steam turbines each consisting of a high pressure, intermediate pressure and low pressure turbine; double reduction gearing; twin propellers; Auxiliary Power: Four auxiliary steam turbines, each driving a 1,750 kW, 220 V DC Generator
- Speed: Trials: 30.64 kn (56.75 km/h; 35.26 mph); Service: 27.5 kn (50.9 km/h; 31.6 mph)
- Capacity: As built, 638 1st class, 1,496 tourist class (1973, 1,750 one class)
- Crew: As built, 980. (1973, 780)

SS Oriana was the last of the Orient Steam Navigation Company's ocean liners. She was built at Vickers-Armstrongs, Barrow-in-Furness, England and launched on 3 November 1959 by Princess Alexandra. Oriana first appeared as an Orient Line ship, with a corn-coloured hull, until 1966, when that company was fully absorbed into P&O. Faced with unprofitable around-the-world passenger routes, the P&O white hulled Oriana was operated as a full-time cruise ship from 1973. Between 1981 and her retirement from service five years later, Oriana was based at Sydney, Australia, operating to Pacific Ocean and South-East Asian ports. Deemed surplus to P&O's requirements in early 1986, the vessel was sold to become a floating hotel and tourist attraction, first in Japan and later in China. As a result of damage sustained from a severe storm whilst in the port of Dalian in 2004, SS Oriana was finally sold to local breakers in 2005.

== History ==
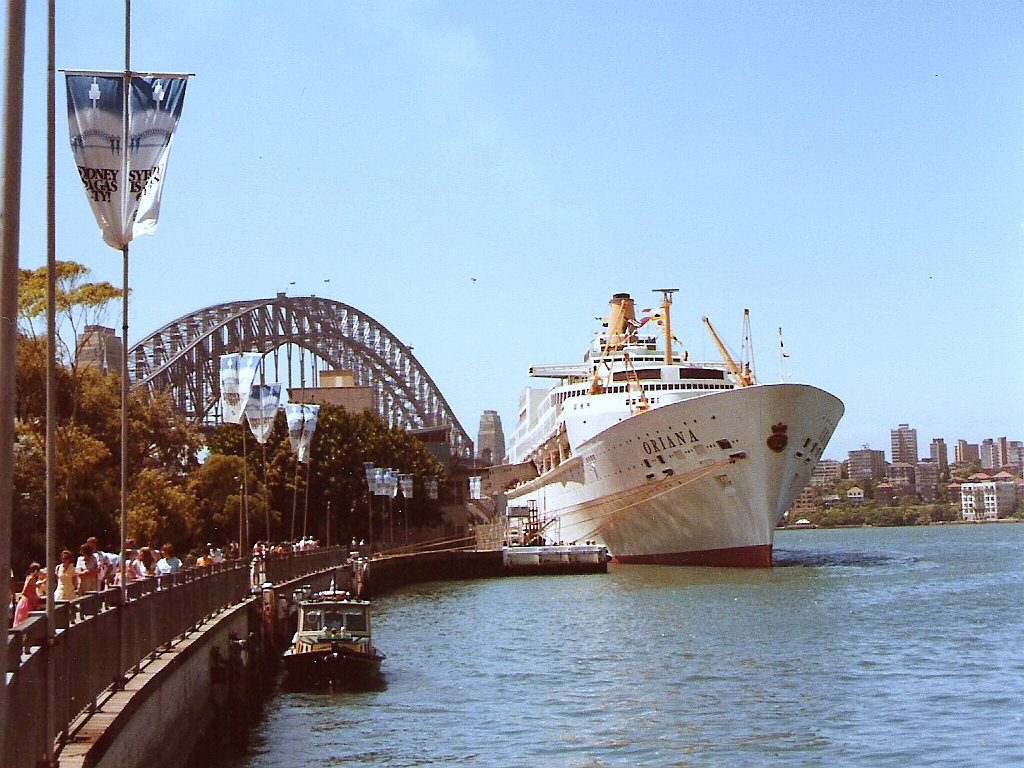
Oriana, seen alongside in Sydney, Australia

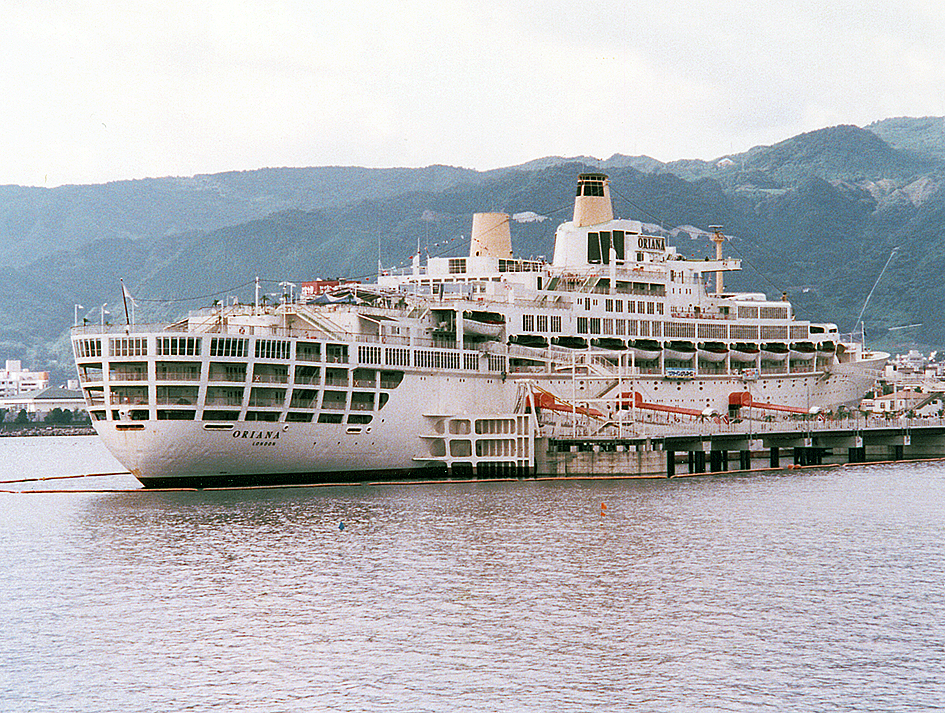
Oriana in her first museum incarnation in Beppu, Japan

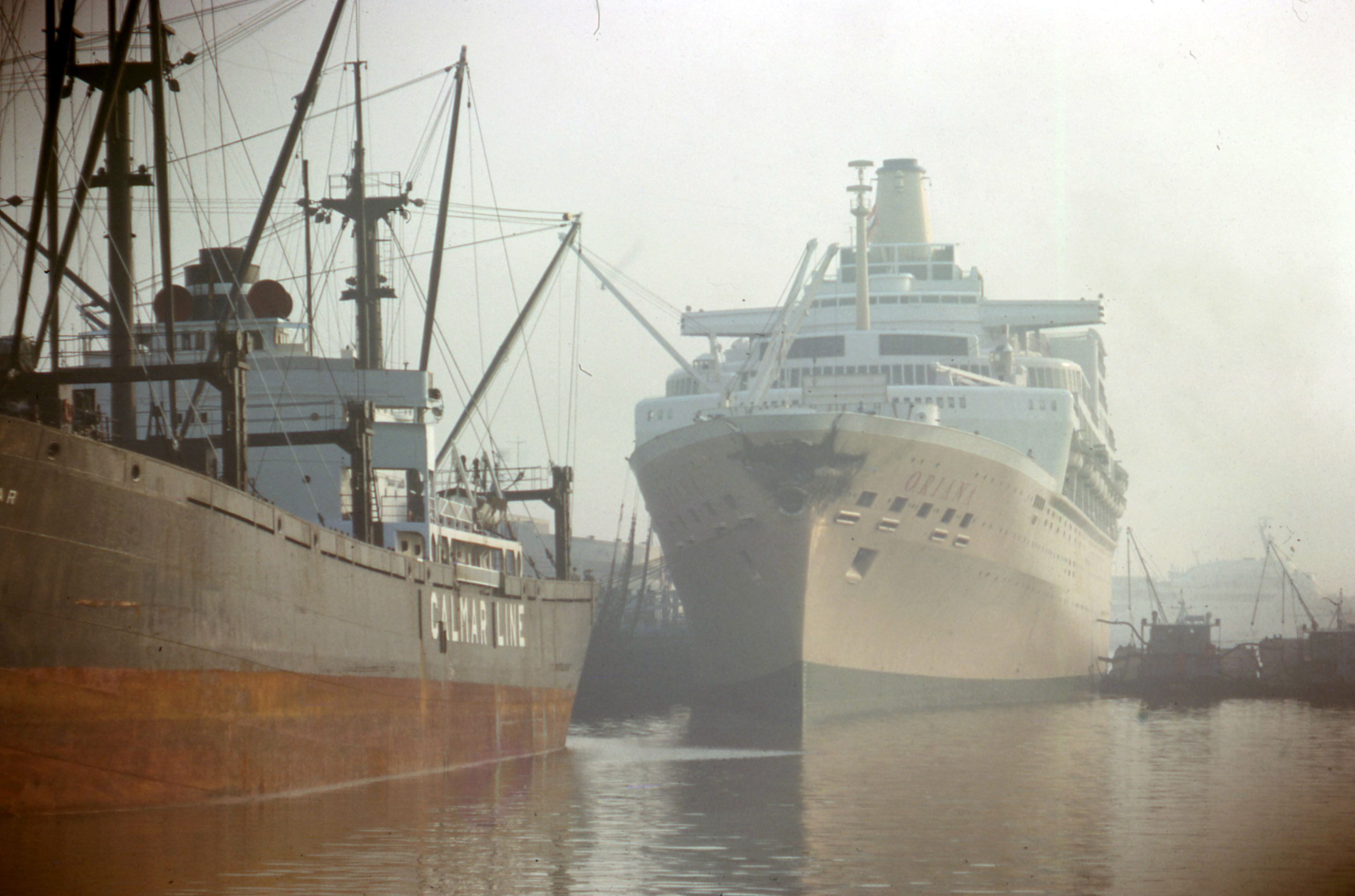
Oriana being repaired at Los Angeles after colliding with USS Kearsarge, December 1962

In May 1954, the Orient Steam Navigation Company began planning to replace SS Orontes and RMS Orion on the United Kingdom to Australia route. One ship was called for, named Orbustus in the early stages of planning, before Oriana was settled on – a poetic reference to both Queen Elizabeth I and the recently crowned Queen Elizabeth II.

Oriana's maiden voyage was from Southampton to Sydney in December 1960, during this voyage the Oriana was the first ocean liner to berth at the Fremantle Passenger Terminal. At 41,915 gross register tons and with capacity for more than 2,000 passengers in two classes (first and tourist), Oriana was briefly the largest passenger liner in service on the UK to Australia and New Zealand route, until the introduction of the 45,733 ton Canberra in 1961. The Canberra could never match the Oriana for speed, however, the latter having achieved 30.64 knots during her pre-hand over trials in 1960 and held the Golden Cockerel trophy for the fastest ship in the P&O fleet which she retained until she retired in 1986, when it was handed back to the Canberra (in spite of the fact that Canberra's speed had by then been reduced to 23 knots). On Canberra's final cruise the Golden Cockerel was handed over to the new MV Oriana when both ships were anchored off Cannes and sent boats out to perform the handover.

In 1962, the Oriana collided with the USS Kearsarge (CVS-33), resulting in damage and an eventual court case with the Government of the United States, Orient Steam Navigation Company v. United States.

In August 1970, the Oriana caught fire while steaming out of Southampton. This serious fire occurred when the boiler room caught fire at the beginning of its journey across the Atlantic on its way to USA, New Zealand, and Australia. Repairs took more than two weeks.

From 1973, Oriana was converted to operate as a one class cruise ship and from 1981 until retirement in March 1986 was based in Sydney. After a layup of two months at No. 21 Pyrmont Wharf, Sydney, the ship was sold and moved to Osaka, Japan, to become a floating hotel. The ship served as a floating museum at Beppu, Ōita, from 1987 but this venture was ultimately not successful, and she was subsequently sold to Chinese interests in 1995. The ship served as a floating hotel and tourist attraction in Shanghai until 2002, when she was moved to Dalian. In 2004 Oriana was damaged in a storm. Repairs proved to be unfeasible, so she was towed to a ship breakers yard and dismantled in 2005.

In 1995, the name Oriana was assigned to the P&O Cruises ship Oriana.

== Passengers ==
British businessman Alistair McAlpine (1942–2014), who would become a frequent visitor to Australia over the course of his life, recounted his journey on the maiden voyage of the Oriana in a memoir:

The SS Oriana was on her maiden voyage, the first of a new generation of ocean liners built to carry both freight and passengers to Australia. This voyage, that I was on with my parents, stopped at many ports before arriving in Australia. The Oriana was a fine ship with luxurious first-class accommodation. My parents' cabin had both a balcony and a sitting room attached to it. My accommodation was a comfortable cabin on a lower deck with a porthole bolted closed against the sea. In the event, the sea treated us well as well sailed through still waters in the Mediterranean and the Red Sea and out into the Indian Ocean. At night, the moon reflected on their calm surfaces and the algae disturbed by the liner's wake glowed, a silver slipstream marking our passage. It was a romantic trip, with stops at Port Said, Suez, Aden and Colombo. The ship was full: the first-class passengers, mostly elderly, had boarded at Southampton; the steerage passengers, at Nice and Naples...
