= MV Buenavista =

Cruise ship and ocean liner

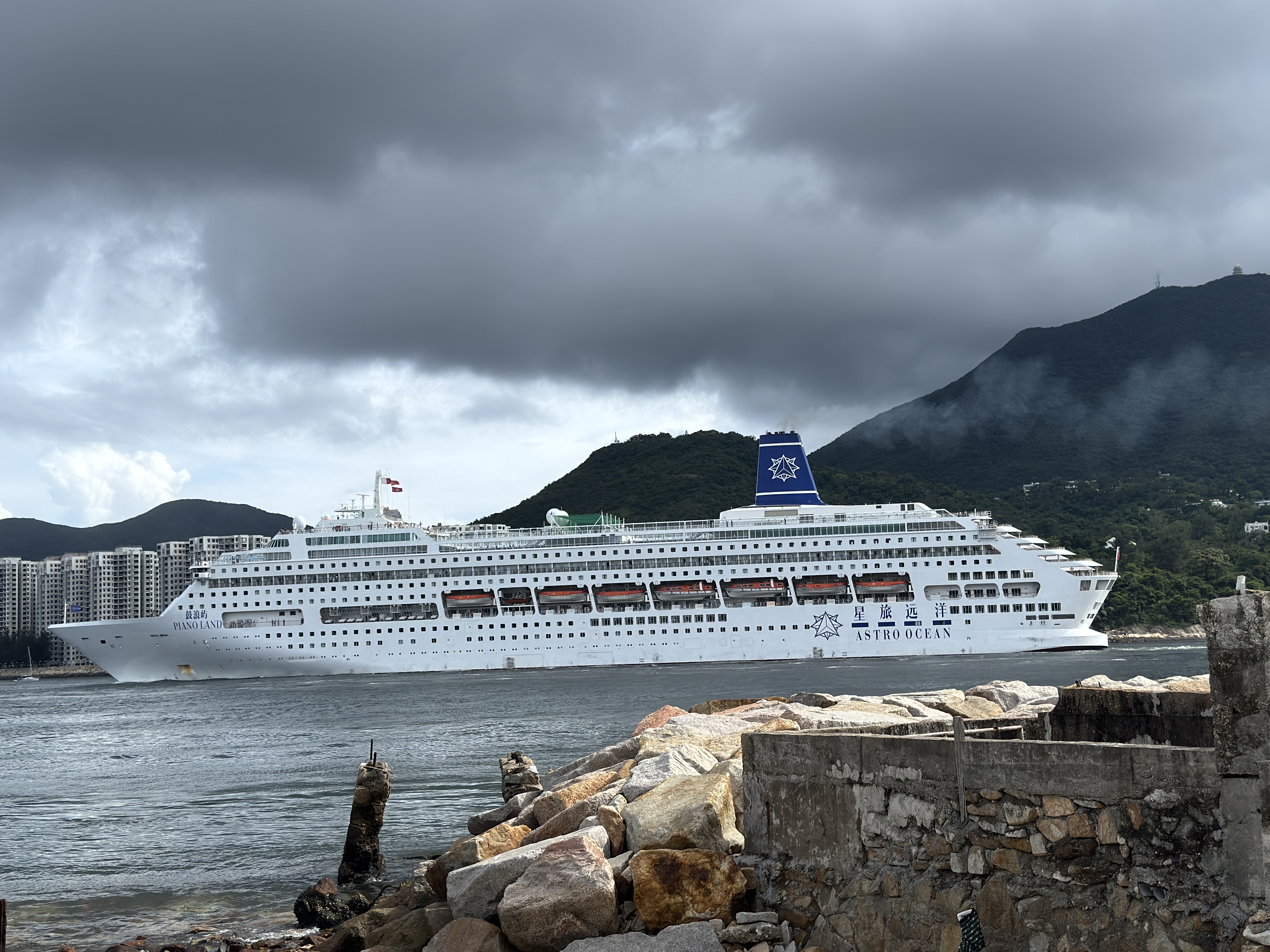
- Buenavista as Piano Land in June 2025

History
- Name: Oriana (1995–2019); Piano Land (2019–2026); Buenavista (2026–present)
- Owner: P&O (1995–2000); P&O Princess Cruises (2000–2003); Carnival Corporation (2003–2019); Astro Ocean (2019–2026); China Cruises (2026–present)
- Operator: P&O Cruises (1995–2019); Astro Ocean (2019–2026); Corazul Cruceros (2026–present)
- Port of registry: (United Kingdom) London (1995–2006); Hamilton, Bermuda (2006–present)
- Builder: Meyer Werft, Papenburg, Germany
- Yard number: 636
- Laid down: 11 March 1993
- Launched: 30 June 1994
- Christened: 6 April 1995; by Queen Elizabeth II
- Acquired: 2 April 1995
- Maiden voyage: 9 April 1995
- In service: 9 April 1995
- Identification: Call sign: ZCDU9; IMO number: 9050137; MMSI number: 310529000

General characteristics
- Type: Cruise ship
- Tonnage: 69,153 GT; 6,715 DWT
- Length: 260.00 m (853.02 ft)
- Beam: 32.20 m (105.64 ft)
- Draught: 7.90 m (25.92 ft)
- Decks: 10 (passenger accessible)
- Installed power: CODAD with 4 × MAN Diesel engines, 2 × 6L58/64 and 2 × 9L58/64 (39,300 kW combined at 400 engine RPM)
- Propulsion: 2 shafts, 2 controllable pitch propellers
- Speed: 26.2 knots (48.5 km/h; 30.2 mph) (sea trials); 24 knots (44 km/h; 28 mph) (service)
- Capacity: 1,822 (normal); 1,928 (maximum)
- Crew: 794

Buenavista is a cruise ship owned by China Cruises and operated by Corazul Cruceros. She originally entered service in April 1995 as Oriana for P&O Cruises, and was named by Queen Elizabeth II. Between 2019 and 2026, she operated as Piano Land for Astro Ocean. She was built by Meyer Werft at their shipyard in Papenburg, Germany, and measures 69,153 gross tons. As Oriana, she held the Golden Cockerel trophy in recognition of being the fastest ship in the P&O Cruises fleet from 1997, when she succeeded her fleetmate Canberra. In early 2026, Spain-based Corazul Cruceros announced plans to acquired the vessel for service in the Mediterranean, the Caribbean and South America.

== Overview ==
Christened in 1995 by Queen Elizabeth II, Oriana was the first new ship commissioned for P&O Cruises, and the first to be designed specifically for the British cruise market. At 69,153 gross tons, she was one of the largest cruise ships in the world. She was also designed in the style of an ocean liner to facilitate long-distance voyages and world cruises. She was the second ship to carry the name Oriana, and was named in tribute to the first Oriana, which served for Orient Line and P&O from 1960 to 1986. After a lengthy campaign, P&O Cruises was permitted to allocate the new Oriana the call sign 'GVSN', which was the same call sign as the first Oriana.

From 1995, when she entered commercial service, until 2000, Oriana was owned by P&O. In 2000 P&O de-merged its cruise ship operations, with ownership of Oriana transferring to the new company, P&O Princess Cruises. In 2003 P&O Princess merged with Carnival Corporation to form Carnival Corporation. Despite these changes of ownership, Oriana was operated by P&O Cruises throughout.

In 2006 she was re-registered to Bermuda so that weddings could be conducted on board, and as a result, her call sign was changed to ZCDU9. In November 2011, Oriana became an adult-only ship.

In August 2019, Oriana was sold to the newly formed Chinese cruise line Astro Ocean and renamed Piano Land.

Corazul Cruceros signed a charter agreement with China Cruises in September 2026. The ship was shortly renamed Buenavista and is planned to operate in Brazil from October.

== General characteristics ==
Buenavista is 260 metres (853 ft) long, with a beam of just over 32 metres (105 ft), and a draught of 7.9 metres (26 ft), which varies up to 8.2 m depending on load. There is a 69,153 GT and a maximum passenger capacity of 1,928. Outside passenger deck space is 105,000 square feet (9,800 m^{2}). Power is provided by four MAN B&W Diesel engines generating a total of 39,300 kW, giving the ship a service speed of 24 knots (44 km/h).

== Design and construction ==
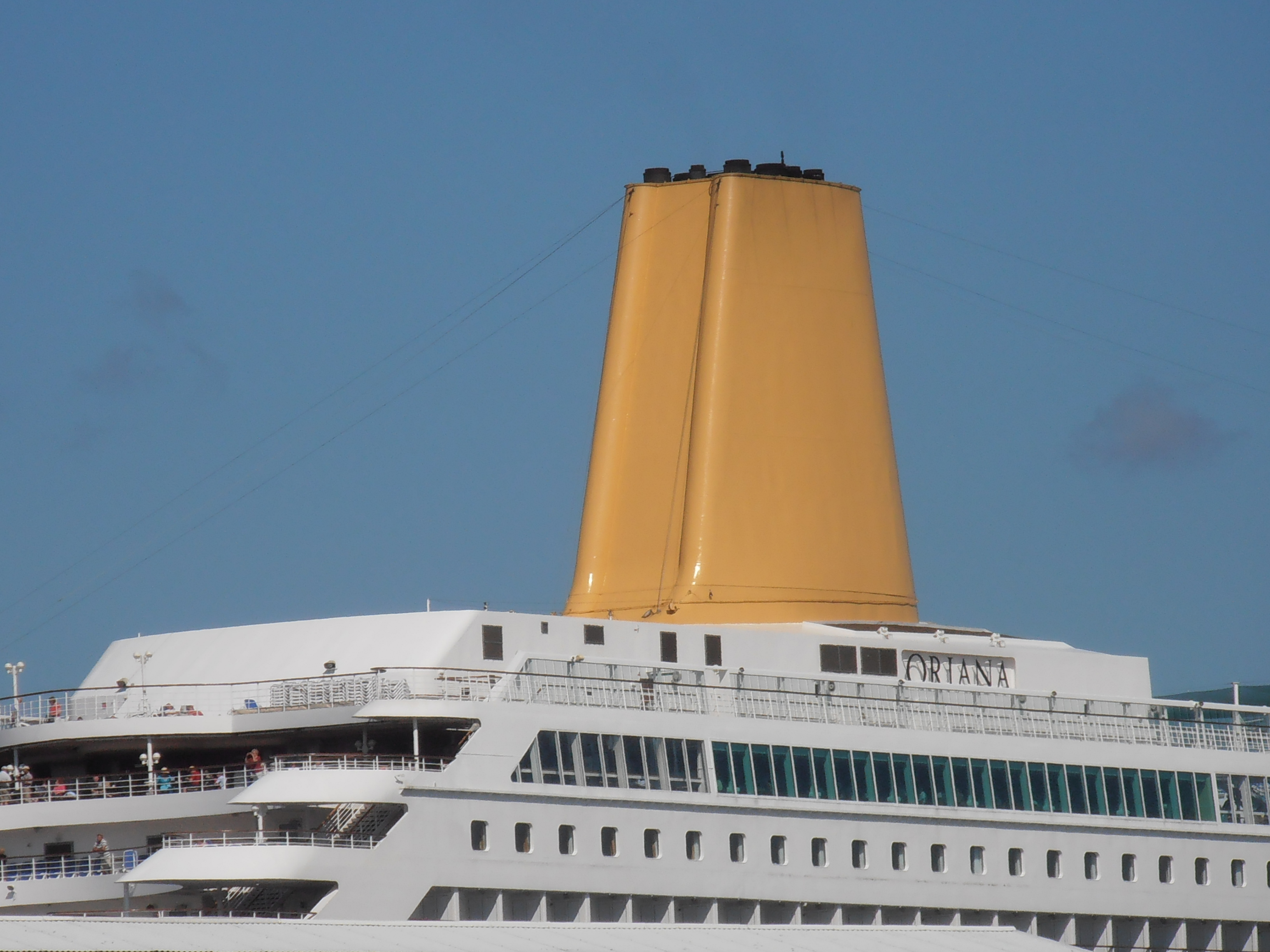
Funnel of Oriana, a design homage to the Canberra's funnel

P&O wanted the new Oriana to be built in the United Kingdom, but there were no longer British shipyards capable of completing such an order, so the line had to look overseas.

Two of the three main designers, Sweden's Robert Tillberg and British designer John McNeece, spent a considerable amount of time on board SS Canberra investigating the needs of British passengers, to include as many of Canberra's features as possible into Oriana's design. Oriana's single funnel is designed to resemble Canberra's twin funnels. She has a single deck of balconies reserved for suites, mini suites, and staterooms to cater to the growing demand for on-board balconies.

P&O engaged John McNeece and his London-based team of designers to bring the British look to the high-revenue generating interiors of the ship, such as Anderson's, Lord's Tavern, the Knightsbridge Shops, the Emporium, Harlequins, the Casino, the Photo Gallery, the Pacific Lounge, and related public spaces, as well as on-board information graphics.

== Service history ==
=== 1995–2019: Oriana ===
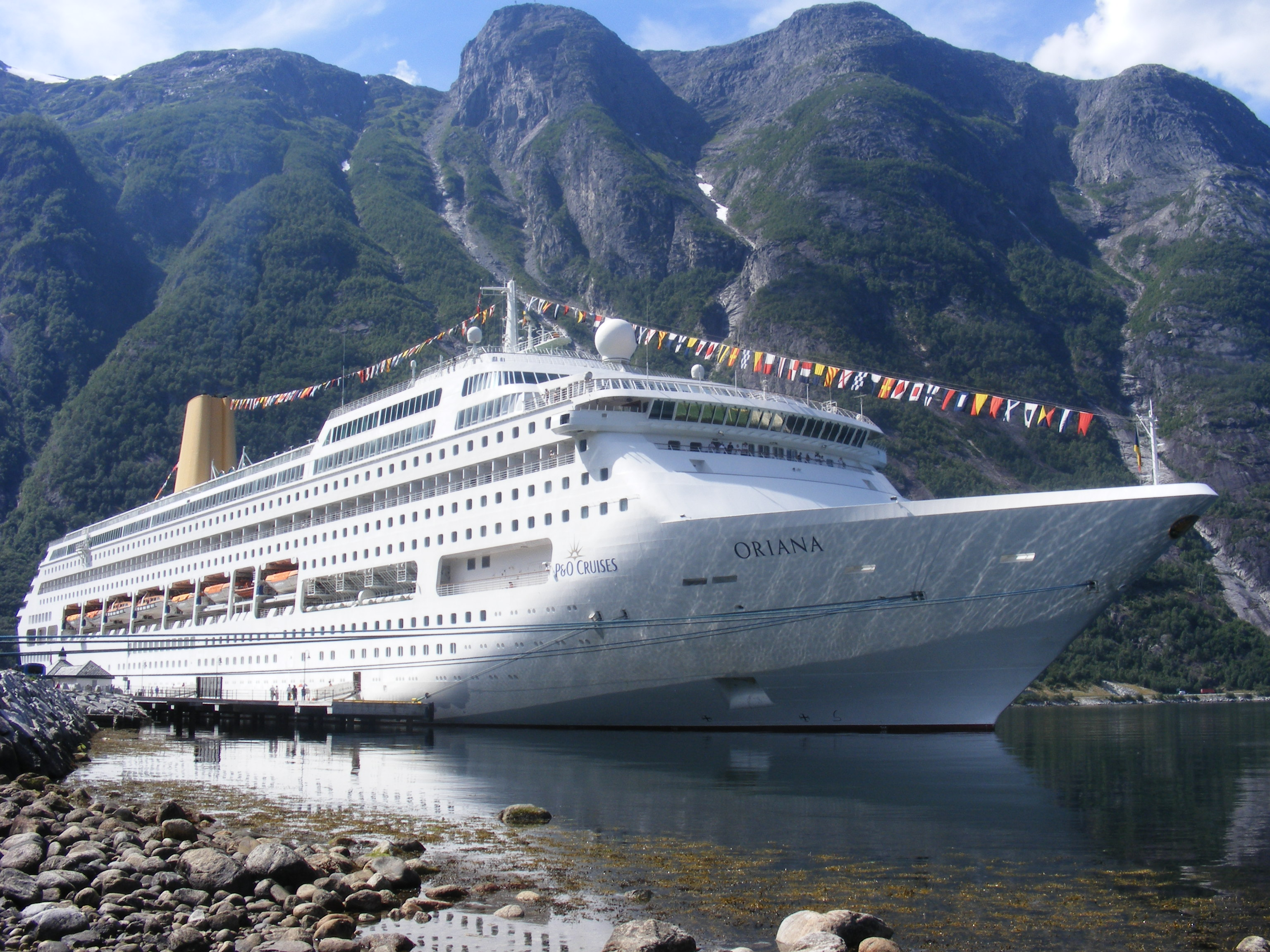
Oriana in Eidfjord, Norway, in 2008, in her original livery

When she entered service Oriana was one of the largest cruise ships in the world, and the largest ship built in Germany since 1914. Since then, tonnage has increased as economies of scale make larger ships more profitable to operate. Nowadays, most new cruise ships have a tonnage of around 100,000 GT. Annually undertaking world cruises with fleetmate Aurora, she normally operated in the Mediterranean, the Canaries, Madeira, and the Baltic Sea.

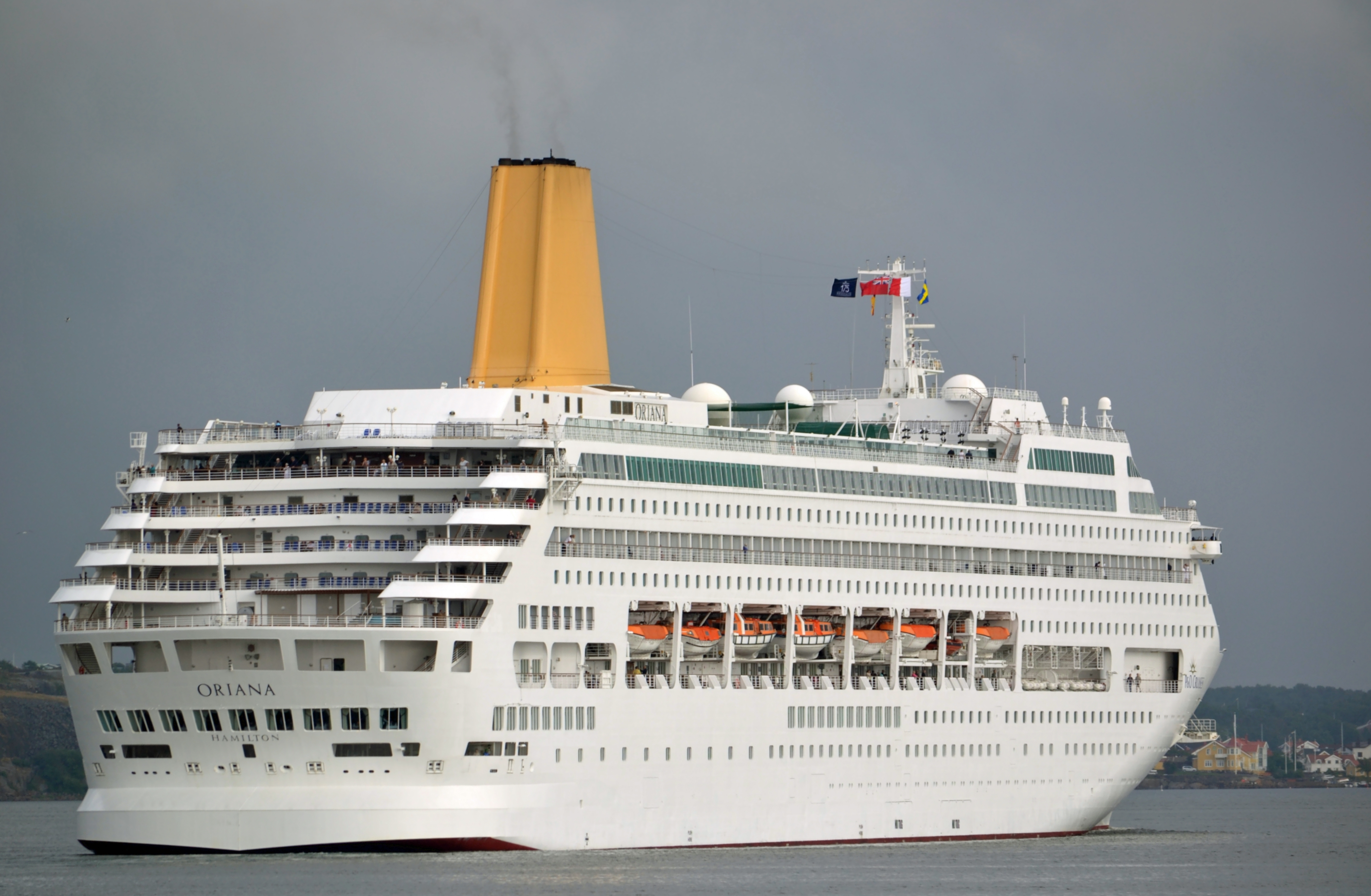
View of the Oriana's terraced aft decks

In December 2006, Oriana underwent a £12 million refit in Bremerhaven, Germany. Coinciding with the refit, she was re-registered from Britain to Bermuda so that weddings could be held at sea. Oriana was also home to 'Oriana Rhodes', a restaurant designed by the celebrity chef Gary Rhodes in the former Curzon Room. This was later replaced by 'Sindhu' by chef Atul Kochhar, which remained in place until Oriana departed from the P&O fleet. Other modifications during the 2006 refit included the extension of the cricket-themed 'Lord's Tavern', and refurbishment of the children's play areas. All her cabins were restyled to include one of four new colour schemes, along with new curtains, carpets, beds, linen, and duvets. During a 2011 refit at the Blohm & Voss shipyard, Oriana's stern was remodelled, and she was converted to serve an adults-only market, with the children's play areas removed and replaced by additional passenger cabins.

During cruises in four consecutive years to 2014, the ship suffered outbreaks of norovirus; about 400 passengers were affected in 2012, earning the vessel the nickname of "the plague ship". In 2014 passengers, angry at not being told of the earlier outbreaks, took legal action against P&O Cruises.

In June 2018, P&O Cruises announced that Oriana would be leaving the fleet in August 2019. Oriana departed on her final cruise, to Norway, the North Cape and Northern Ireland, on 23 July 2019 and returned on 9 August.

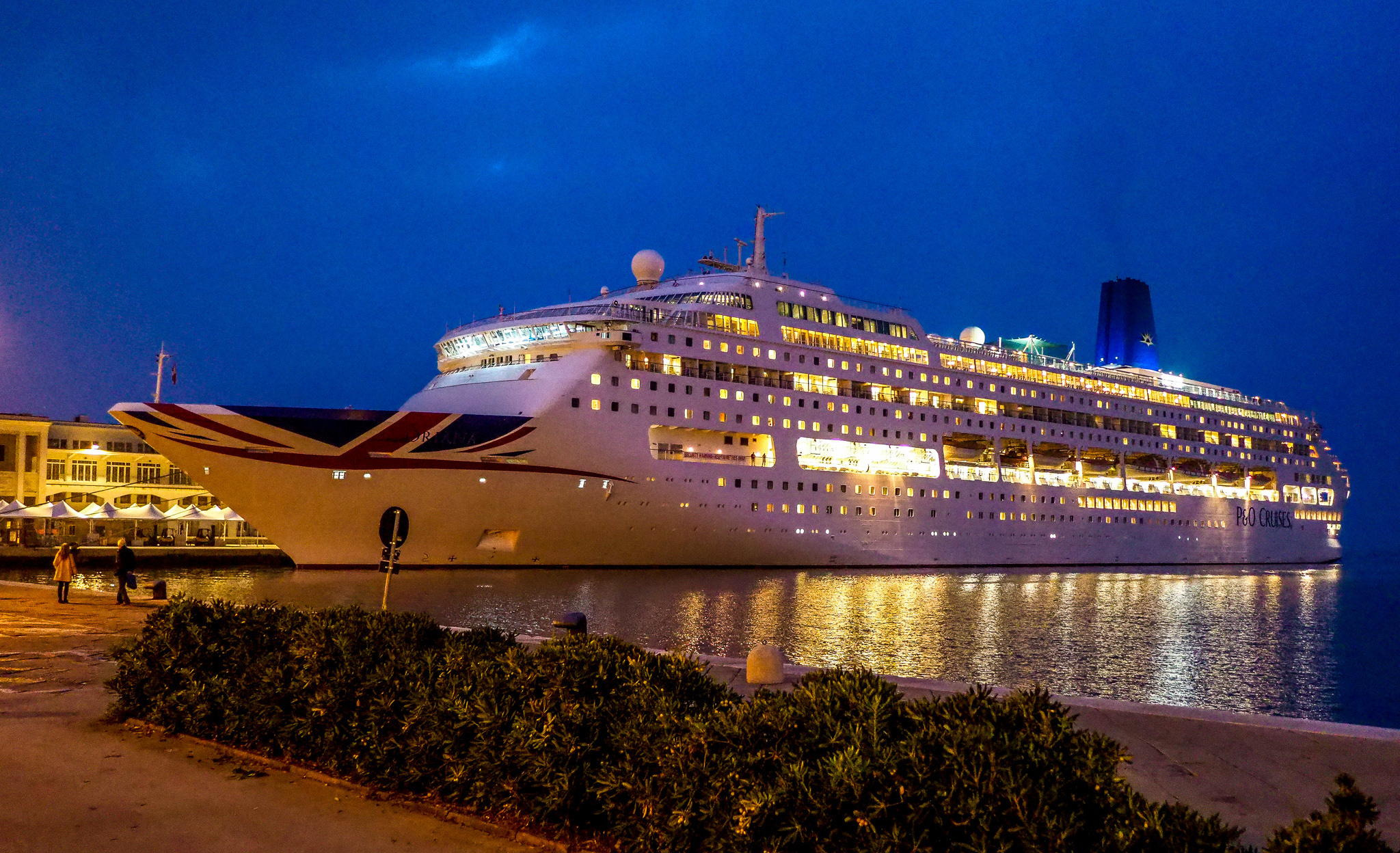
MV Oriana with the current image of P&O Cruises on November 20, 2017

=== 2019–2026: Piano Land ===
In August 2019, Oriana joined the newly-formed Chinese cruise line Astro Ocean, and was renamed Piano Land. The name was chosen in reference to the Chinese island of Gulangyu, which is associated with music and known as the 'Island of Music'. Piano Land departed Southampton on 16 August 2019 and arrived in Xiamen, China on 20 September. She was christened by Ni Chao, the Director of the Xiamen Municipal Committee and the Director of the Free Trade Commission, on 26 September. Astro Ocean Cruises and the Piano Land made their debut in Shanghai on 8 November 2019 as the ship marked her maiden call in China's leading cruise port.

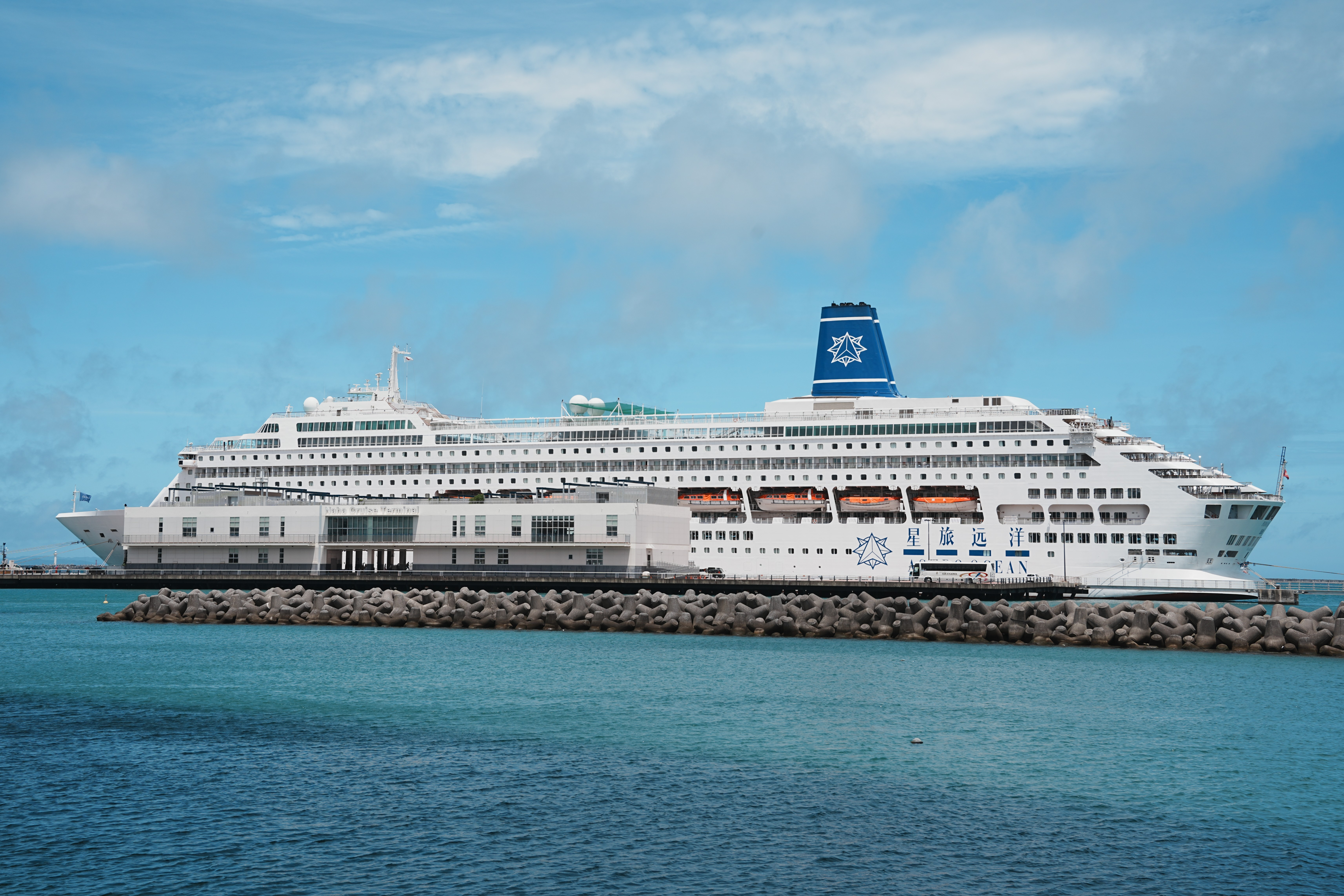
Piano Land at Naha Port Facility

In 2020, the ship was laid up due to the COVID-19 pandemic. In May 2022 the ship went into drydock, but as of November 2022 remained out of service and docked in Xiamen, China. As of 24 March 2024, Piano Land was listed for sale. In July 2024, the ship re-entered service after four years out of service.

=== 2026–present: Buenavista ===
The ship was chartered to Corazul Cruceros in September 2026 and renamed Buenavista, operating in Brazil.

With the startup mentioning the need to address technical issues onboard, operations were suspended a week after the inaugural cruise in late October 2026.
