= MV Ventura =

Grand-class cruise ship

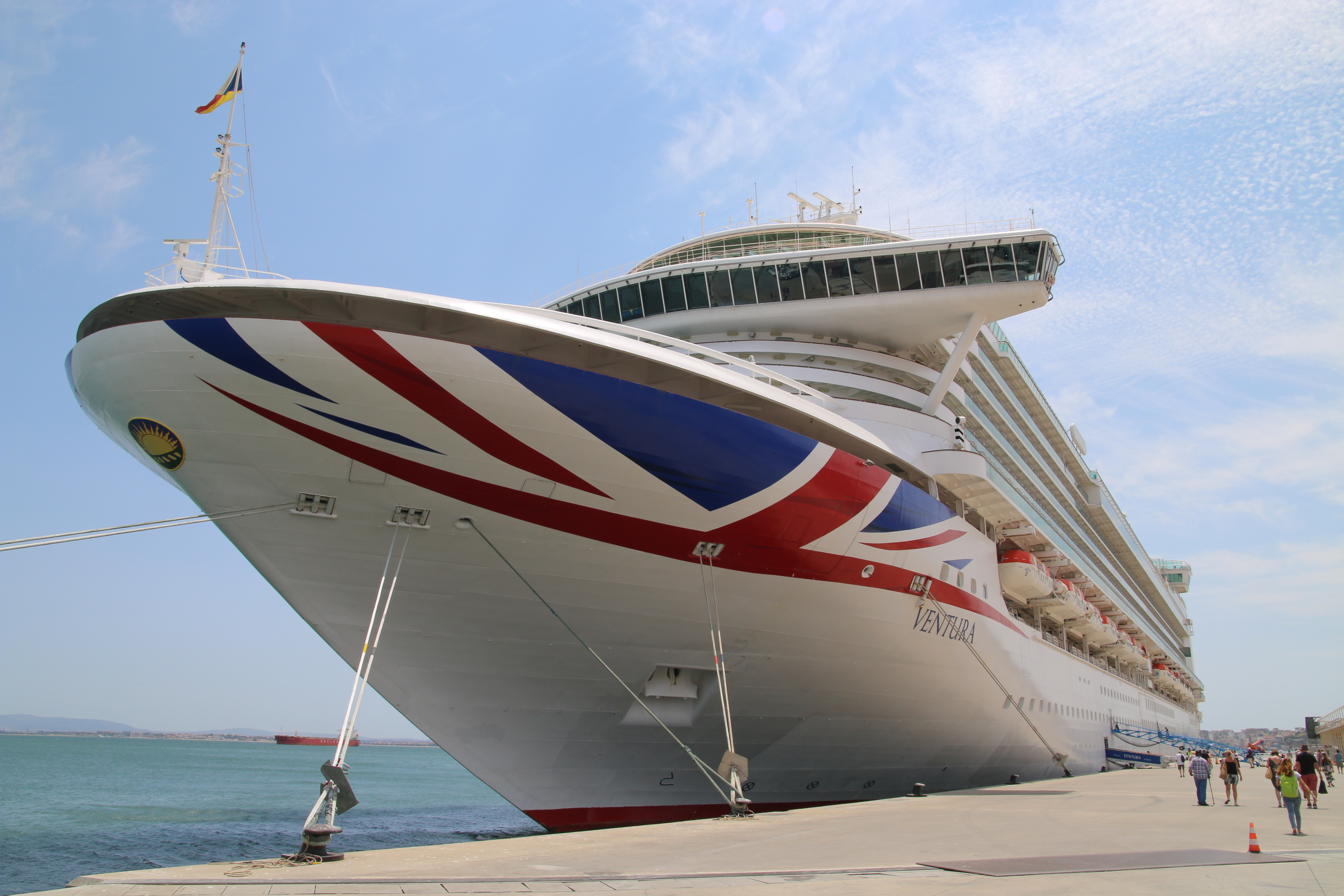
- Ventura in the Port of Lisbon, Portugal

History

Bermuda
- Name: Ventura
- Owner: Carnival Corporation
- Operator: P&O Cruises
- Port of registry: Hamilton, Bermuda
- Builder: Fincantieri, Monfalcone Italy
- Yard number: 6132
- Laid down: 29 August 2006
- Launched: 8 June 2007
- Christened: 16 April 2008; by Helen Mirren
- Acquired: 31 March 2008
- Maiden voyage: 18 April 2008
- In service: April 2008
- Identification: Call sign: ZCDT2; IMO number: 9333175; MMSI no.: 310562000
- Status: Operational

General characteristics
- Class & type: Grand-class cruise ship
- Tonnage: 116,017 GT; 85,676 NT; 8.400 DWT
- Length: LOA 288.6 m (946 ft 10 in)
- Beam: 36 m (118 ft 1 in)
- Draught: 8.5 m (27 ft 11 in)
- Depth: 36 m (118 ft 1 in)
- Decks: 19 (14 passenger decks)
- Deck clearance: 27.55 m (90 ft 5 in)
- Propulsion: 6 × Wärtsilä diesel engines (2 × I8, 4 × V12)
- Speed: 23.2 knots (43.0 km/h; 26.7 mph)
- Capacity: 3,192 passengers; 3,597 berths

Ventura is a Grand-class cruise ship of the P&O Cruises fleet. The 116,017 GT ship was built by Fincantieri at their shipyard in Monfalcone, Italy and is 288.6 m (946 ft 10 in) long. She officially entered service with the company in April 2008 and was named by Dame Helen Mirren. Ventura underwent a refit at the Blohm+Voss shipyard in Hamburg, Germany, during March and April 2013, and re-entered service on 7 April 2013 with a voyage to Spain and Portugal. In February 2023 she underwent a minor refit again at the Hamburg shipyard, re-entering service four weeks later.

== Overview ==
Ventura is owned by Carnival Corporation and operated by P&O Cruises. When the ship entered service in April 2008, she was one of the largest cruise ships built for the British market. Ventura can accommodate 3,192 passengers, and has 1,550 cabins, of which about 60% possess private balconies. It has fourteen public decks, eight restaurants, six boutiques, five pools and three show lounges, including a theatre.

After being handed over on 29 March, Ventura arrived in Southampton in the morning of 6 April 2008, ahead of its first mini cruise to Belgium on 11 April, and her first full cruise on 18 April.

British actress Helen Mirren officially christened Ventura and became the ship's "godmother", prior to its maiden cruise to the Mediterranean Sea. In a break with tradition, Dame Helen commanded a team of Royal Marine Commandos to assist her in naming Ventura in a dramatic abseil.

== Ship history ==
During the Christmas 2008/New Year 2009 period in the Caribbean, there were reports of loutish behaviour on board, culminating in a rift between passengers who had paid the full fare and those who had not, described by the media as a passenger "rebellion". As a result of the problems, two passengers were ejected from the ship and three scheduled ports of call were omitted from the itinerary.

After experiencing bad weather on 18 October 2012 in the Bay of Biscay, Ventura suffered slight damage to the aluminium superstructure deck high up on the ship. Ventura underwent repairs in Southampton on 19 October 2012. P&O stated that this had no structural strength or safety implications. Some passengers were ordered not to use their balconies.

Shortly after leaving the southern tip of Tenerife, on 25 October 2014 at around 6.15pm, Ventura experienced a fault with two of its six engines. As a result, power was lost. Once generators were working again and providing power to the ship, the engines restarted, around 40 minutes later. It then proceeded onwards, completing its further itinerary with no further issues. It was, however, reported by passengers that the same thing had happened on departure from Genoa, a week earlier.

On 5 September 2018, Ventura was involved in a rescue mission off the coast of Gibraltar. Three men were rescued, when their jet ski had run out of petrol and drifted 100 miles (160 km) into the Mediterranean Sea. All three men were rescued safely and stayed on Ventura until the Spanish Coast Guard arrived to collect them.

On 8 December 2019, Ventura suffered technical problems with her propulsion system. Tugboat assistance was called for and overnight Ventura was assisted back to the port of Santa Cruz de Tenerife. The ship had lost all four of her propulsion converters following a major steam leak in the technical spaces where these systems were housed. No injuries were sustained with damage limited to the propulsion converters and the steam system.The converters were completely shut down and a number of major components identified as needing replacing as these had failed due to ingress of steam into the systems. An Emergency Response Team was sent to meet the vessel at Tenerife arriving on 9 December. Repair work, using spares brought by the team was completed on one propulsion system on 10 December and a short sea trial, using the port propulsion motor, conducted overnight with Lloyds Surveyors and Carnivals Electrical SME overseeing the tests. On 12 December all four propulsion systems were repaired and fully tested with a short sea trial, using both of the 20MWA propulsion motors, being conducted in waters off Tenerife with tugs available in case of any problems. Lloyds and the ship's team were satisfied the ship was safe to operate without further restrictions and Ventura returned to Southampton missing out on the scheduled stops of Lanzarote and Lisbon. An engineering team remained on board the ship to monitor the systems and disembarked in Southampton on 17 December. A reduction of 50% of the fares was promised to all passengers. A total of 600 passengers elected to be flown back to the UK by charter aircraft on 12 December. During a presentation to passengers in the Arena Theatre on 16 December, Captain Andy Willard gave more details of the technical problems. On a scale of 1–10 he ranked this problem as '9'. He further explained that five tugs attended on 8 December two of which were 'pirate' tugs hoping for salvage rights. Specialist parts to repair the propulsion problem were flown in from Los Angeles, a sister ship in the Caribbean and the manufacturers in Germany together with a team of technical specialists. Ventura returned to Southampton on 17 December 2019, three days later than scheduled.

On the voyage following this incident further incidents occurred aboard involving a muster call and a fire in the onboard restaurant resulting in a crew member being airlifted from the ship by the Portuguese coastguard on the morning following.

During the COVID-19 pandemic in 2020, the vessel spent some time moored off Bournemouth and Teignmouth.

On 6 February 2022 at approximately 18.30 Ventura suffered a power and propulsion failure about 40 nautical miles (74 km; 46 mi) south of Plymouth in the English Channel. This failure was at the end of a 35-day cruise to the Caribbean. After 10 minutes lighting was restored and the main engines were restarted after a further 20 minutes. The ship then continued to Southampton docking around 0600 on 7 February at Ocean Terminal without incident. During the 30-minute failure the vessel drifted beam on to the prevailing westerlies at around 4 knots (7 km/h; 5 mph).

On 4 June 2022 a forklift, operated by the Port of Southampton, dropped a luggage cart into the Solent while attempting to lift it from the vessel. Two ship's tenders were launched to retrieve the luggage, unfortunately a small number of bags could not be recovered.

In May 2024, while on a cruise to the Canary Islands, several hundred people were taken ill on board as a result of an outbreak of norovirus.
