= MS Arvia =

Cruise ships

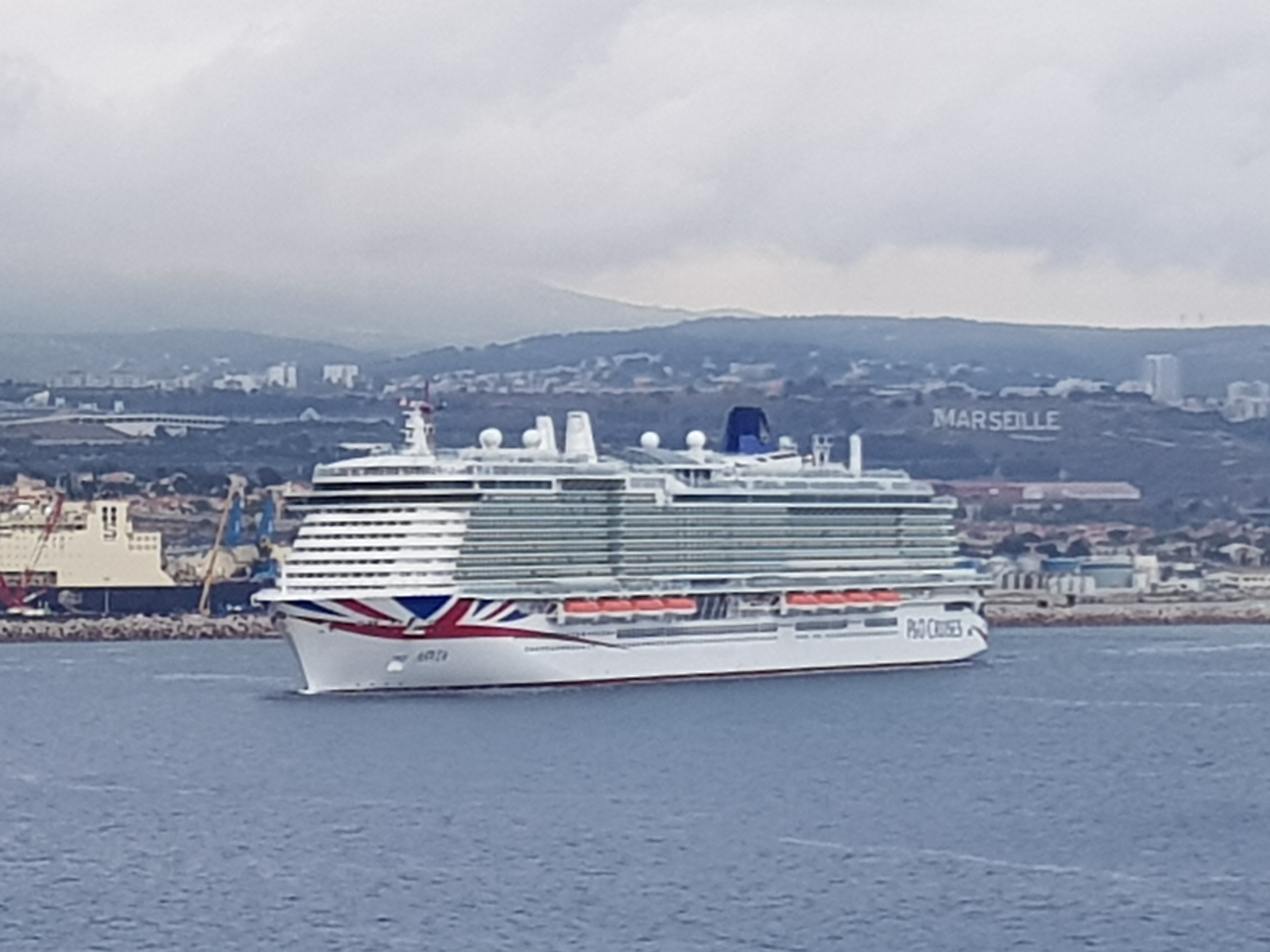
- Arvia near Marseille, 2023

History

Bermuda
- Name: Arvia
- Owner: Carnival Corporation & plc
- Operator: P&O Cruises
- Port of registry: Southampton, United Kingdom (2022–2025); Hamilton, Bermuda (2025–present)
- Ordered: January 2018
- Builder: Meyer Werft, Papenburg, Germany
- Cost: £730 million
- Yard number: S. 716
- Laid down: 15 February 2022
- Launched: 27 August 2022
- Sponsored by: Nicole Scherzinger
- Christened: 16 March 2023
- Completed: 15 December 2022
- Acquired: 15 December 2022
- Maiden voyage: 23 December 2022
- Identification: Call sign: ZCHG8; IMO number: 9849693; MMSI number: 310856000
- Status: Afloat

General characteristics
- Class & type: Excellence-class cruise ship
- Tonnage: 185,581 GT
- Displacement: 87,276 t (85,898 long tons)
- Length: 344.08 m (1,128 ft 10 in)
- Beam: 42 m (137 ft 10 in)
- Height: 69.3 m (227 ft 4 in)
- Draught: 8.8 m (28 ft 10 in)
- Decks: 16 complete, 3 partial
- Installed power: total installed power: 61.7 MW (82,700 hp)
- Propulsion: 2 × 18.5 MW (24,800 hp)
- Speed: Service speed: 22 knots (41 km/h; 25 mph)
- Capacity: 6,685 passengers max
- Crew: 1,782

MS Arvia is an Excellence-class cruise ship in service for P&O Cruises, a subsidiary of Carnival Corporation & plc. The ship's keel was laid on 15 February 2022. The ship was built by German shipbuilder Meyer Werft at Papenburg and left the shipyard on 5 November 2022. She was delivered on 9 December 2022 to P&O Cruises. Construction officially started in February 2021.

At about 184,700 gross tonnage (GT), Arvia is the largest ship to service the British cruise market. She was floated out on 27 August 2022.

== Construction and description ==
Delivery was originally planned for the first half of 2022, but later postponed to December 2022. Arvia was originally planned to embark her maiden voyage on 9 December 2022 but due to operational reasons, this was delayed to 23 December. Her maiden voyage was a 14-night Canary Islands cruise from Southampton. On 2 March 2023, P&O Cruises announced that Arvia's godmother would be Nicole Scherzinger.

Arvia has over 30 bars and restaurants on board. Her design is similar to that of her sister ship, Iona, with some differences.

First, and unlike Iona, Arvia has two included Freedom Restaurants (Main Dining Rooms) and two included themed dining venues. Iona has four included Freedom restaurants. The additional themed dining venues aboard Arvia are the 6th Street Diner which is themed after a traditional American diner and The Olive Grove which is a Mediterranean-style restaurant. However, they both include the main buffet like all P&O ships the "Horizon". They also feature inside of the main atriums, "The Glass House" (On Deck 7), which is a dining venue with handpicked wine for Olly Smith.

Even though The Olive Grove is also available on Iona, there are a few differences. In particular, there are no supplements for selected dishes on the Arvia menu unlike Iona and Arvia's The Olive Grove is located on deck 6 instead of deck 8. Arvia also has a few specialty (extra) dining venues including Keel & Cow which is a gastropub, Green & Co which is a fish and plant-based restaurant, Sindhu which is an Indian restaurant and the Epicurean which is a fine dining venue which requires a more than casual dress code before entering.

Another difference between Iona and Arvia is that the atrium on Arvia has a more wooden tone while on Iona, it uses more marble. Like Iona, Arvia has four swimming pools, including two infinity pools. Arvia also has 20 whirlpools including 10 infinity whirlpools, a skydome with a retractable glass roof and a seascreen (outdoor cinema screen). Additionally, Arvia has an activity zone with a ropes course and adventure mini-golf course which are both are in the Altitude named location.

Arvia's onboard spa, available at extra cost, has several facilities, including a hydrotherapy area with a salt steam room, cold room, sauna and experiential showers.

Arvia's normal operating capacity is 5,200 passengers even though her maximum capacity if 3rd and 4th berths are used is 6,685 passengers.

== Naming ceremony ==
On 16 March 2023, Arvia was named in Barbados by Nicole Scherzinger. The naming ceremony was a beachside ceremony. Olly Murs was also singing in the event. Prime Minister of Barbados, Mia Mottley was also present in the event and gave a speech during the event.
