= P&O Cruises =

British-American owned cruise line

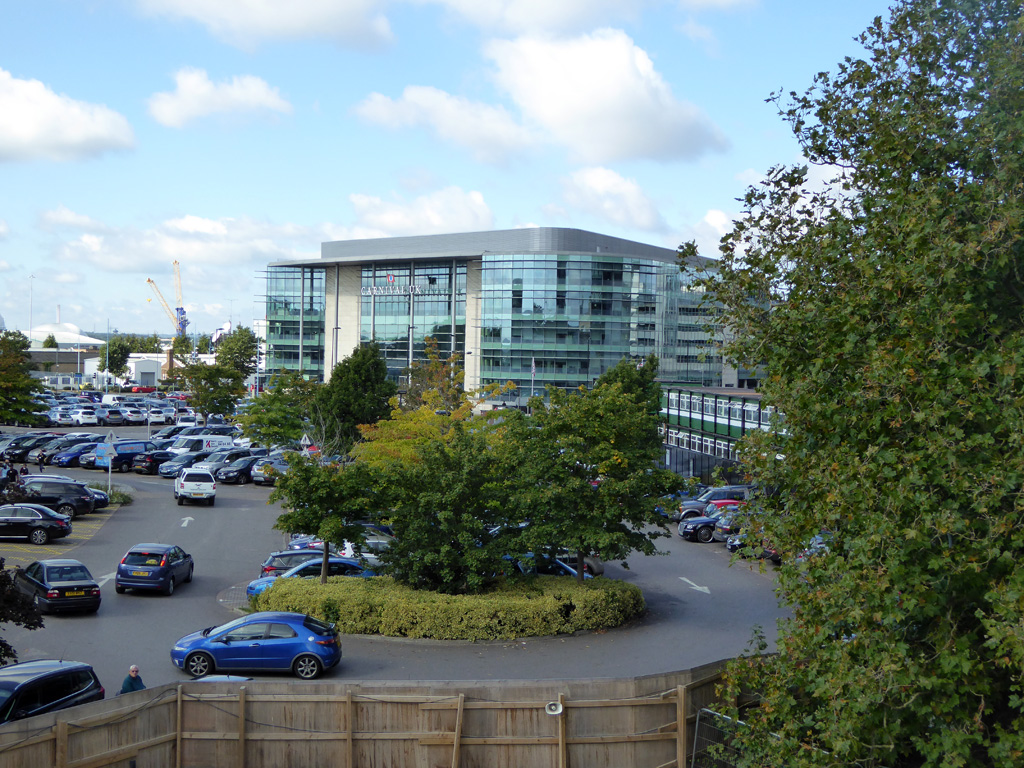
- Carnival House, Southampton
- Type: Subsidiary
- Industry: Hospitality and transportation
- Predecessor: P&O
- Founded: 1977; 49 years ago
- Headquarters: Southampton, England
- Area served: United Kingdom
- Key people: Paul Ludlow (President)
- Products: Cruises
- Revenue: $3.964 billion (2025)
- Parent: Carnival Corporation
- Website: www.pocruises.com
- Footnotes P&O House Flag

P&O Cruises is a British cruise line based at Carnival House in Southampton, England, operated by Carnival UK and owned by Carnival Corporation. It was founded in 1977 as a subsidiary of the freight transport company P&O. It has the oldest heritage of any cruise line in the world, dating to P&O's first passenger operations in 1837.

The company was divested from P&O in 2000, after which its ownership changed to P&O Princess Cruises. P&O Princess subsequently merged with Carnival Corporation in 2003, after which the company came under its current ownership.

== History ==
=== Origins ===
In 1834, Brodie McGhie Willcox, a ship broker from London, and Arthur Anderson, a sailor from the Shetland Islands, formed an association with Captain Richard Bourne, a steamship owner from Dublin. In 1837, the trio won a contract and began transporting mail and passengers from England to the Iberian Peninsula, founding the Peninsular Steam Navigation Company. In 1840, the company merged with the Transatlantic Steam Ship Company and expanded their operations to the Orient, becoming the Peninsular and Oriental Steam Navigation Company (P&O). In 1844, P&O expanded its passenger operations from transportation to include leisure cruising, operating sailings from England to the Mediterranean that were the first of their kind. By the mid-1900s, passenger shipping for the purposes of transportation was threatened by the increasing affordability of air travel. Consequently, in the 1970s, P&O dedicated its passenger operations entirely to leisure cruising and, in 1977, relisted its passenger ships under the new subsidiary P&O Cruises.

=== 1977–1995: Early years ===
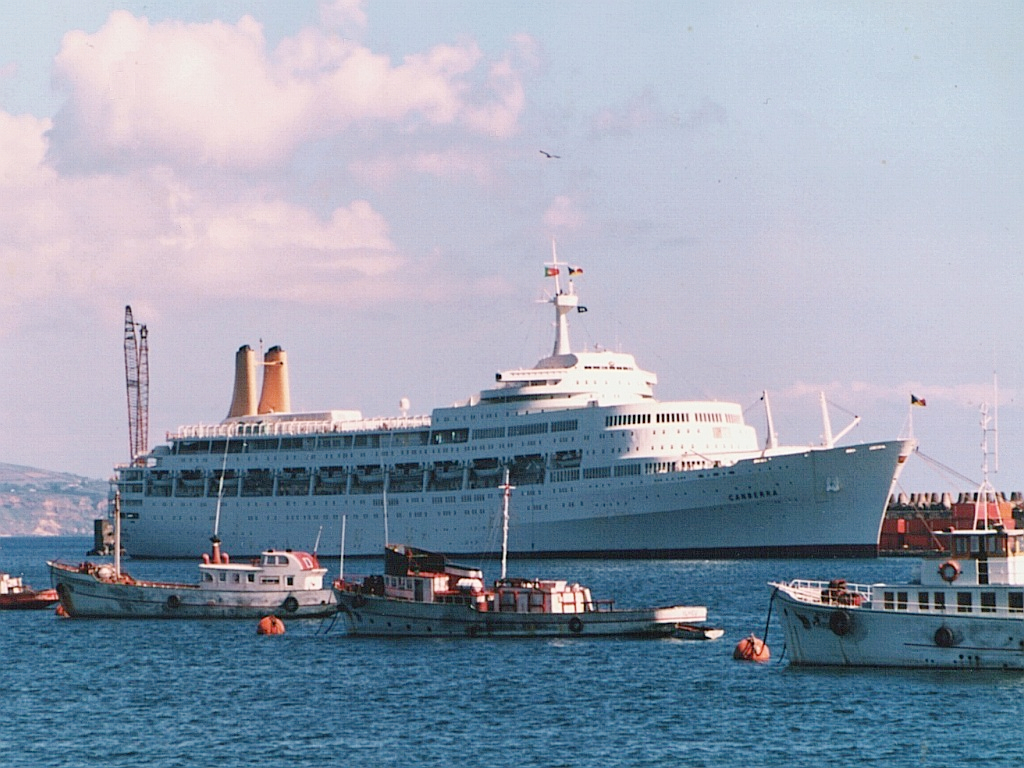
Canberra of 1961 in Ponta Delgada, Azores in 1984

Initially, P&O Cruises operated Oriana and Canberra from Southampton, serving the UK market, and Arcadia from Sydney, serving the Australian market, while Uganda operated educational cruises. All of these ships had previously operated for P&O and had been transferred to the new subsidiary. There were several changes over the following years. In 1979, Arcadia departed the Australian fleet and was replaced by Sea Princess, which was formerly Kungsholm for Flagship Cruises. In 1981, Oriana relocated to serve the Australian market, and in 1982, Sea Princess relocated to serve the UK market. The same year, both Canberra and Uganda were requisitioned to assist in the Falklands War, with the former becoming a troopship and the latter a hospital ship.

More ships departed the fleet in the following years; Uganda in 1983, Oriana in March 1986 and Sea Princess in November 1986. With only Canberra remaining, serving the UK market, P&O diverged its Australian operations from its UK operations in 1988, acquiring Sitmar Cruises, which already operated a ship in Australia. This ultimately led to the formation of P&O Cruises Australia, which would oversee Australian operations, while P&O Cruises focused on UK operations.

=== 1995–2008: First newbuilds and changes of ownership ===
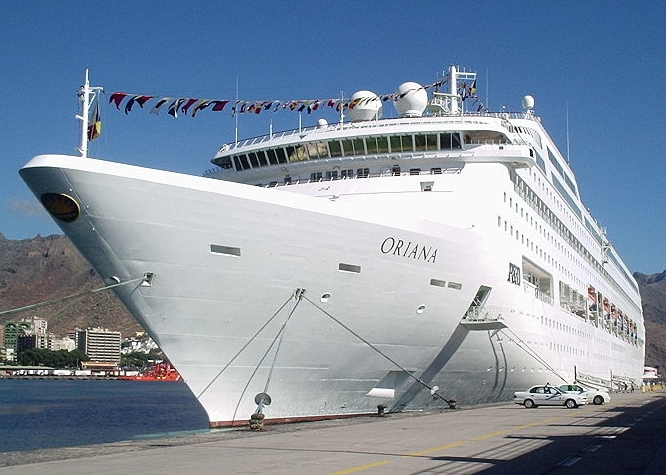
Oriana of 1995 at Las Palmas, Gran Canaria in 2003

In the 1990s, P&O Cruises commissioned its first newbuild, the second Oriana, which entered service in April 1995. Unlike the older ocean liners the company had inherited from P&O, which had originally been designed to transport passengers from one place to another, the new Oriana was a cruise ship, built purely for pleasure cruising. At 69,153 gross tons, she was one of the largest cruise ships in the world. Sea Princess also returned to the fleet in 1995, now renamed Victoria. Canberra departed the fleet in 1997 and was replaced the same year by a second Arcadia, formerly Star Princess for Princess Cruises. In 2000, Aurora, another newbuild of similar design to Oriana, entered service, although she suffered a disappointing start when she was forced to abandon her maiden voyage due to mechanical problems.

The ownership of P&O Cruises changed twice in the early 2000s. In 2000, P&O divested its cruise operations and transferred them to the new independent company P&O Princess Cruises, and in 2003, P&O Princess Cruises merged with Carnival Corporation to form Carnival Corporation & plc.

Fleet rotations continued. Victoria departed for the final time in 2002, Oceana, formerly Ocean Princess for Princess Cruises, joined the same year and Arcadia departed in 2003. Adonia, formerly Sea Princess and a sister to Oceana, replaced Arcadia the same year, before being replaced by a newbuild Arcadia in 2005. The new Arcadia had originally been intended for Holland America Line and later Cunard Line, but was allocated to P&O Cruises by Carnival during construction. Arcadia was joined by Artemis, formerly Royal Princess for Princess Cruises.

=== 2008–present: Expansion and modernisation ===
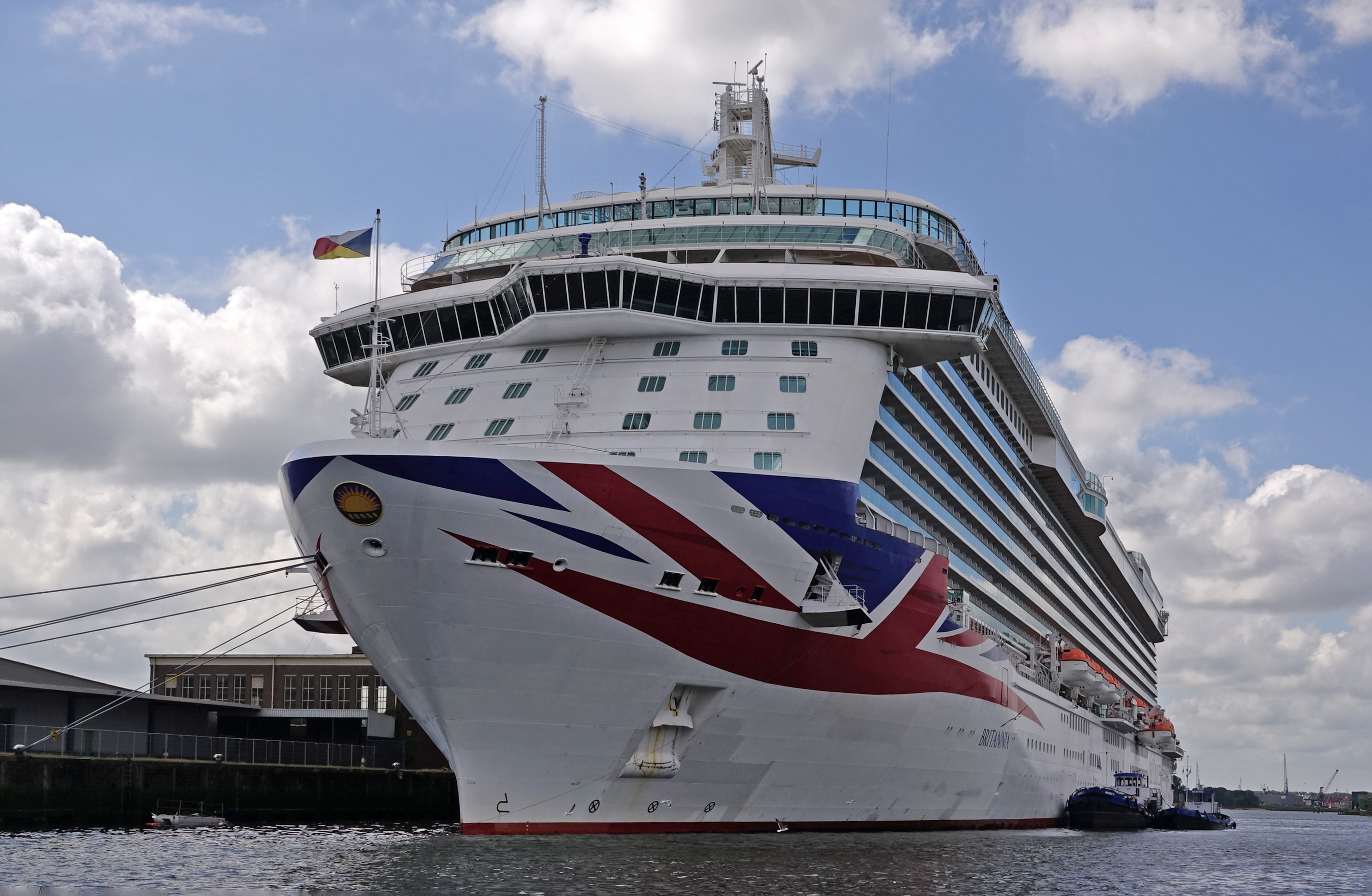
Britannia of 2015 in Rotterdam, Netherlands in 2019, bearing the company's post-2014 livery

The fleet expanded and modernised with the addition of the 116,017-ton newbuild Ventura in 2008 and her sister Azura in 2010. Artemis also departed the fleet in 2011 and was replaced by a second Adonia, which like Artemis had formerly been Royal Princess for Princess Cruises.

In 2012, P&O Cruises celebrated the 175th anniversary of the Peninsular Steam Navigation Company by staging a 'Grand Event', in which the entire fleet – at that point consisting of Adonia, Arcadia, Aurora, Azura, Oceana, Oriana and Ventura – was assembled in Southampton.

The company's modernisation continued with the introduction of a new livery in 2014 based on the Union Jack, to emphasise its British heritage, and the arrival of the 143,730-ton newbuild Britannia in 2015. More departures followed; Adonia transferred to Carnival's new Fathom brand between 2016 and 2017, before departing permanently in 2018, and Oriana, the company's first newbuild, departed in 2019.

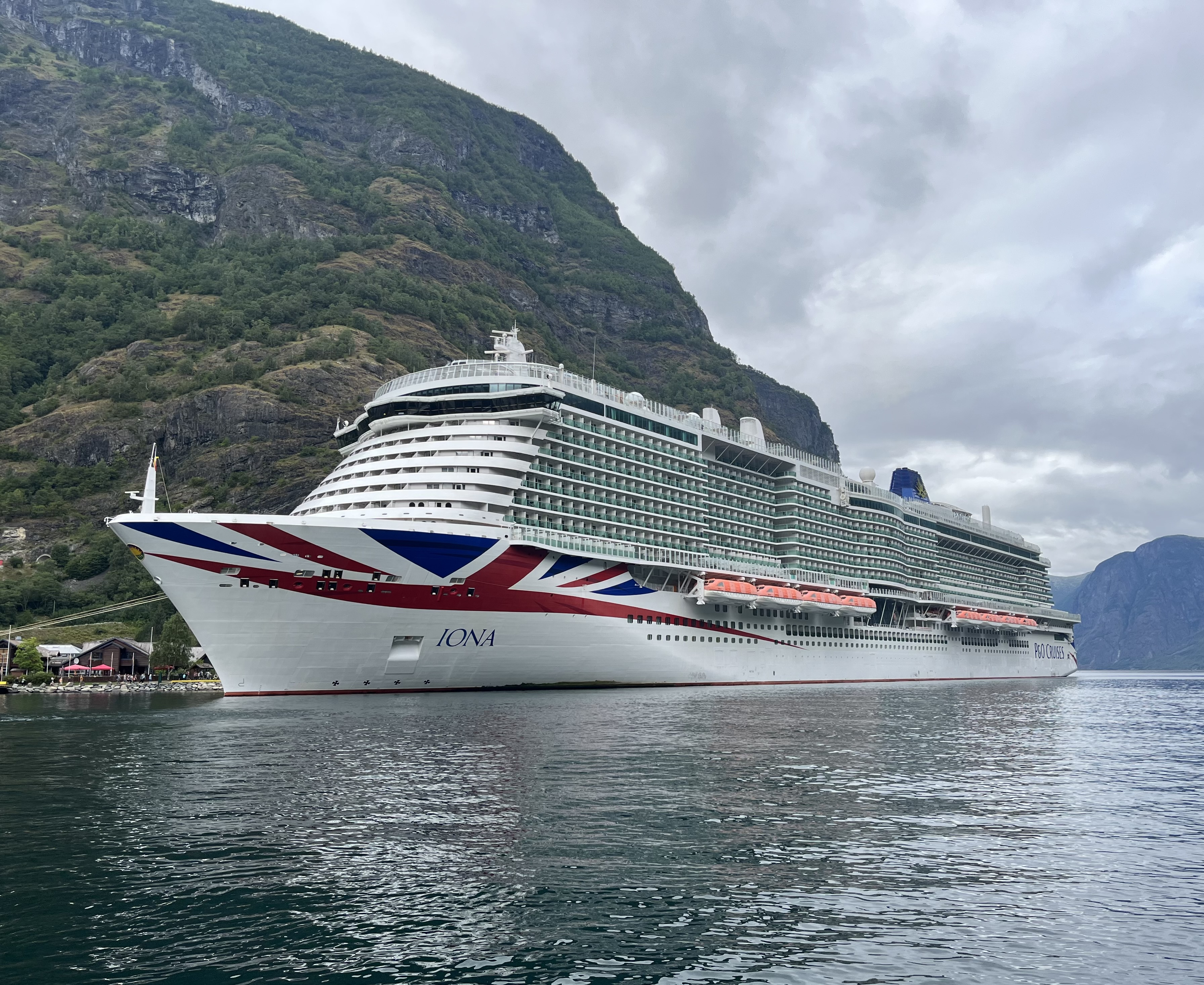
Iona was P&O Cruises' first ship to be powered by liquified natural gas (LNG)

In March 2020, P&O Cruises joined every cruise line worldwide in suspending passenger operations as a result of the COVID-19 pandemic. This led to the departure of Oceana in July 2020, as Carnival sold older ships across its fleets in order to increase liquidity.

In October 2020, the company expanded once more with the addition of the 184,089-ton newbuild Iona. Iona was the first ship built for the British market to be powered by liquefied natural gas (LNG), rather than fuel oil, in an effort to make her more environmentally friendly. However, her maiden voyage was ultimately delayed as passenger operations did not resume until June 2021. She was joined by a sister, Arvia, in 2022.

In March 2022, P&O Cruises suffered a public backlash following a mass firing of staff by P&O Ferries, another former subsidiary of P&O. They subsequently embarked on an advertising campaign in national newspapers and on social media to clarify their separate ownership.

In May 2026, Carnival Corporation & plc unified under the name Carnival Corporation.

In October 2026, Carnival Corp announced a fleet shuffle, resulting in Cunard's Queen Anne joining the fleet in 2029, following its final world cruise. While Arcadia would be transferred to Holland America Line following a farewell season in 2029.

== Golden Cockerel ==
P&O Cruises awards the company's Golden Cockerel trophy to the fastest ship in its fleet. The trophy is currently held by Aurora, which achieved a speed of 25.7 knots in April 2019. It was previously held by the first Oriana until her retirement in 1986, Canberra until her retirement in 1997, and the second Oriana until her retirement in 2019.

== Fleet ==
=== Current fleet ===
Ship	Built	Builder	Entered service	Gross tonnage	Flag	Notes	Image
Aurora	2000	Meyer Werft	2000	76,152	Bermuda	Has held the Golden Cockerel trophy since 2019	
Arcadia	2005	Fincantieri	2005	84,342	Bermuda	Will transfer to Holland America Line in 2029	Arcadia departing Tallinn Port of Tallinn 27 June 2017
Ventura	2008	Fincantieri	2008	116,017	Bermuda		
Azura	2010	Fincantieri	2010	115,055	Bermuda		
Britannia	2015	Fincantieri	2015	143,730	Bermuda		
Iona	2020	Meyer Werft	2021	184,089	Bermuda	Joint largest cruise ship ever built for the UK market with Arvia	
Arvia	2022	Meyer Werft	2022	185,581	Bermuda	Joint largest cruise ship ever built for the UK market with Iona	

=== Future fleet ===
Ship	Built	Builder	Entering service	Gross tonnage	Flag	Notes	Image
TBA	2023	Fincantieri	2029	114,188	Bermuda	Currently sailing as Queen Anne, will join the fleet in 2029 after an extensive dry dock	

=== Former fleet ===
Ship	Built	Builder	In service	Gross tonnage	Flag	Notes	Image
Arcadia	1954	John Brown & Company	1977–1979	29,734	United Kingdom	Arcadia for P&O from 1954 to 1977; Scrapped in 1979	
Uganda	1952	Barclay Curle	1977–1983	14,430	United Kingdom	Uganda for the British India Steam Navigation Company from 1952 to 1972, P&O from 1972 to 1977, and the Royal Navy from 1983 to 1985; Scrapped in 1992	
Oriana	1960	Vickers-Armstrong	1977–1986	41,910	United Kingdom	Oriana for P&O from 1960 to 1977; Floating hotel and museum from 1986 to 2004; Capsized in 2004 and scrapped in 2005; Held the Golden Cockerel trophy until 1986	
Canberra	1961	Harland and Wolff	1977–1997	49,073	United Kingdom	Canberra for P&O from 1961 to 1977; Scrapped in 1997; Held the Golden Cockerel trophy from 1986 to 1997	
Sea Princess /Victoria	1965	John Brown & Company	1979–1986 (as Sea Princess), 1995–2002 (as Victoria)	27,670	United Kingdom	Kungsholm for Swedish America Line from 1966 to 1975 and Flagship Cruises from 1975 to 1978; Sea Princess for Princess Cruises from 1986 to 1995; Mona Lisa for Holiday Kreuzfahrten from 2002 to 2006; Oceanic II for Louis Cruises in 2007, Pullmantur Cruises in 2007, and The Scholar Ship from 2007 to 2008; Mona Lisa for Lord Nelson Seereisen in 2008, Peace Boat from 2008 to 2009, and Lord Nelson Seereisen from 2009 to 2010; Scrapped in 2016	
Arcadia	1988	Chantiers de l'Atlantique	1997–2003	63,500	United Kingdom	Star Princess for Princess Cruises from 1989 to 1997; Ocean Village for Ocean Village from 2003 to 2010; Pacific Pearl for P&O Cruises Australia from 2010 to 2017; Columbus for Cruise & Maritime Voyages from 2017 to 2020 and Seajets from 2020 to 2021; Scrapped in 2021	
Adonia	1998	Fincantieri	2003–2005	77,499	United Kingdom	Sea Princess for Princess Cruises from 1998 to 2003 and 2005 to 2020; Charming for Foresee Cruises since 2020	
Artemis	1984	Wärtsilä	2005–2011	44,348	Bermuda	Royal Princess for Princess Cruises from 1984 to 2005; Artania for Phoenix Reisen since 2011	
Adonia	2001	Chantiers de l'Atlantique	2011–2016, 2017–2018	30,277	Bermuda	R Eight for Renaissance Cruises from 2001 to 2003; Minerva II for Swan Hellenic from 2003 to 2007; Royal Princess for Princess Cruises from 2007 to 2011; Adonia for Fathom from 2016 to 2017; Azamara Pursuit for Azamara Club Cruises since 2018	
Oriana	1995	Meyer Werft	1995–2019	69,153	Bermuda	Piano Land for Astro Ocean from 2019 to 2026; Buenavista for Corazul Cruceros since 2026; Held the Golden Cockerel trophy from 1997 to 2019	
Oceana	2000	Fincantieri	2002–2020	77,499	Bermuda	Ocean Princess for Princess Cruises from 2000 to 2002; Queen of the Oceans for Seajets since 2020	
