= MS Queen Anne =

Pinnacle-class cruise ship

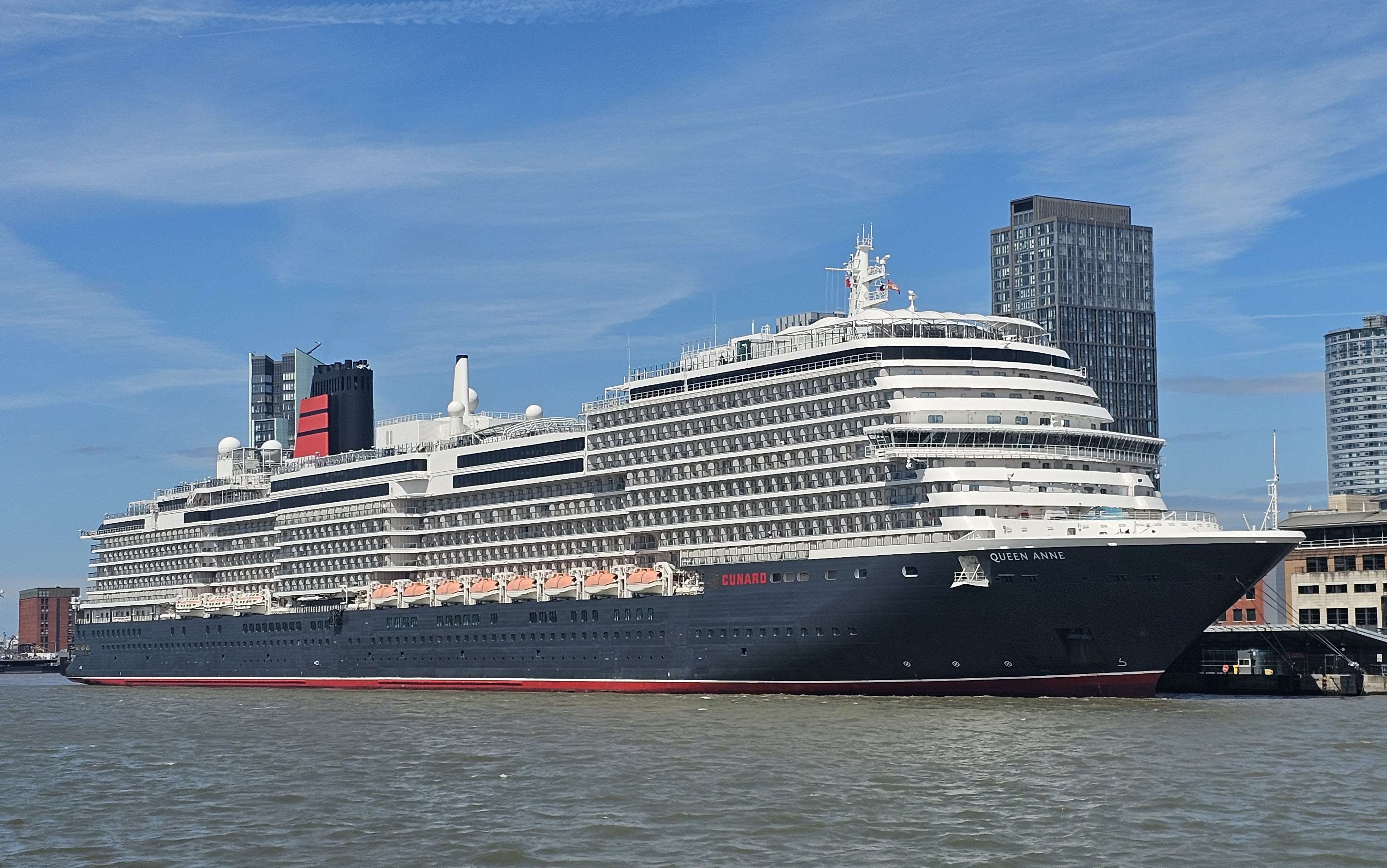
- Queen Anne in the River Mersey, 17 June 2026

History

Bermuda
- Name: Queen Anne
- Namesake: Anne, Queen of Great Britain
- Owner: Carnival Corporation & plc
- Operator: Cunard Line until 2029, to be transferred to P&O Cruises
- Port of registry: Hamilton, Bermuda (2024-present)
- Ordered: 2017
- Builder: Fincantieri Marghera Shipyard, Italy
- Cost: US$600 million (approx.)
- Yard number: 6274
- Laid down: 5 October 2022
- Launched: 24 April 2023
- Completed: 3 May 2023
- Maiden voyage: 3 May 2024
- In service: 3 May 2024
- Identification: Call sign: ZCHE5; IMO number: 9839399; MMSI number: 310835000
- Status: In service

General characteristics
- Class & type: Pinnacle series 4 cruise ship
- Tonnage: 114,188 GT
- Length: 322.51 m (1,058 ft 1 in)
- Beam: 35.60 m (116 ft 10 in)
- Installed power: 4 × Caterpillar-MaK 12V43C, each 16,896 hp (12,599 kW)
- Propulsion: 2 × ABB Azipods
- Capacity: 3,000 maximum passengers

MS Queen Anne (QA) is the sole Halifax-class (an extended Pinnacle-class) cruise ship operated by Cunard Line, named after Anne, Queen of Great Britain, who reigned from 1702–1714. She is currently the second largest ship in Cunard's fleet, after RMS Queen Mary 2. She sailed from her homeport of Southampton on 3 May 2024 for her maiden voyage, calling at A Coruña and Lisbon. She can carry up to 3,000 passengers.

She is scheduled to leave the Cunard fleet in 2029, when she will have design changes take place before moving to the P&O Cruises.

== History ==
In 2017 Cunard announced the order of the fourth ship in their current fleet and the 249th ship in its history. It was initially announced that the new vessel would be based on the MS Koningsdam, Holland America Line's Pinnacle-class ship. With a gross tonnage of 113,000, the ship would carry up to 3,000 passengers. The delivery was originally planned for 2022, but later the maiden voyage was postponed to January 2024. Later, this was pushed back again, to May 2024.

In June 2019 Cunard announced the design team for the public spaces. Steel cutting began at Fincantieri’s Castellammare di Stabia shipyard on 11 October 2019. The forward stub was transferred to Marghera in August 2022 for completion. On 3 May 2023 the structurally complete ship was floated out of the construction dry dock for the first time.

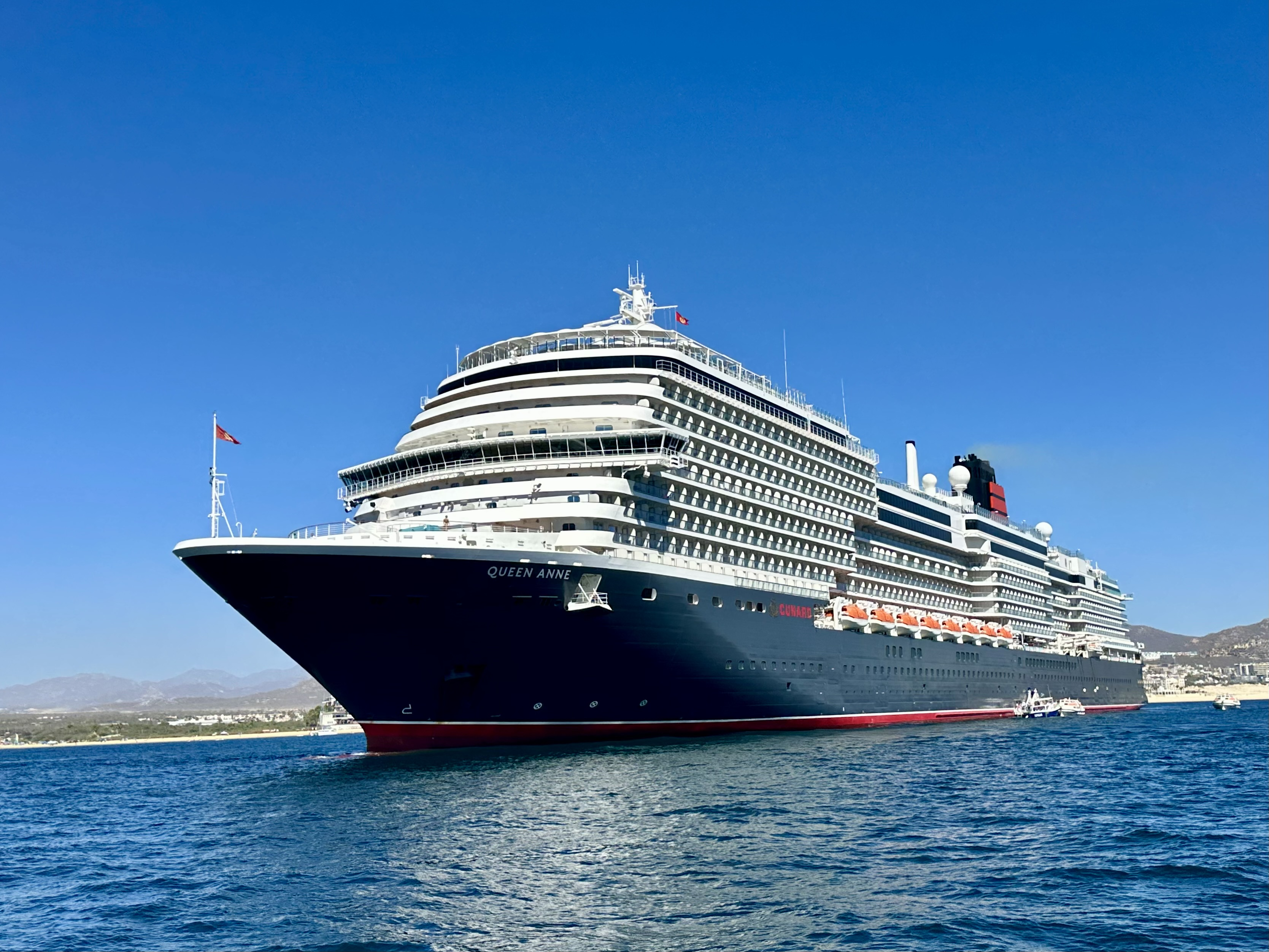
''Queen Anne in Cabo San Lucas, 2025

Media agencies initially speculated whether the ship's name would continue with Cunard's practice of naming them after queens or return to its long-standing convention of giving their vessels names ending in -'ia' like past Cunard ships RMS Aquitania, RMS Berengaria, RMS Caronia and RMS Mauretania. In February 2022, Cunard announced that the ship would be named Queen Anne. Maritime historians Chris Frame and Rachelle Cross were engaged to work with Cunard to name the ship's six grand suites, so named after famous Cunard waterways including: River Mersey, River Clyde, Hudson River, The Solent, Boston Harbor and Halifax Harbour.

The ship's maiden voyage, a 7-night-voyage to Lisbon, began on 3 May 2024 in Southampton. The ship's maiden insights presenters, who hosted presentations as part of the ship's Insights Programme were Yeoman Warder Peter McGowran, Sports Broadcaster Clare Balding and Maritime Historian Chris Frame.

On 3 June 2024 at Liverpool, Queen Anne was christened by Ngunan Adamu, Natalie Haywood, Jayne Casey, Katarina Johnson-Thompson and Melanie C. The city of Liverpool was also announced to be the godmother of the ship. Cunard broke with their usual traditions by not selecting an individual to name the ship, and in keeping the godparent a secret until the day of the ceremony.

On 6 October 2026, Carnival Corporation announced Queen Anne would be transferred to P&O Cruises in 2029, following a large reimagining.
