= MS Iona =

P&O Cruise ship

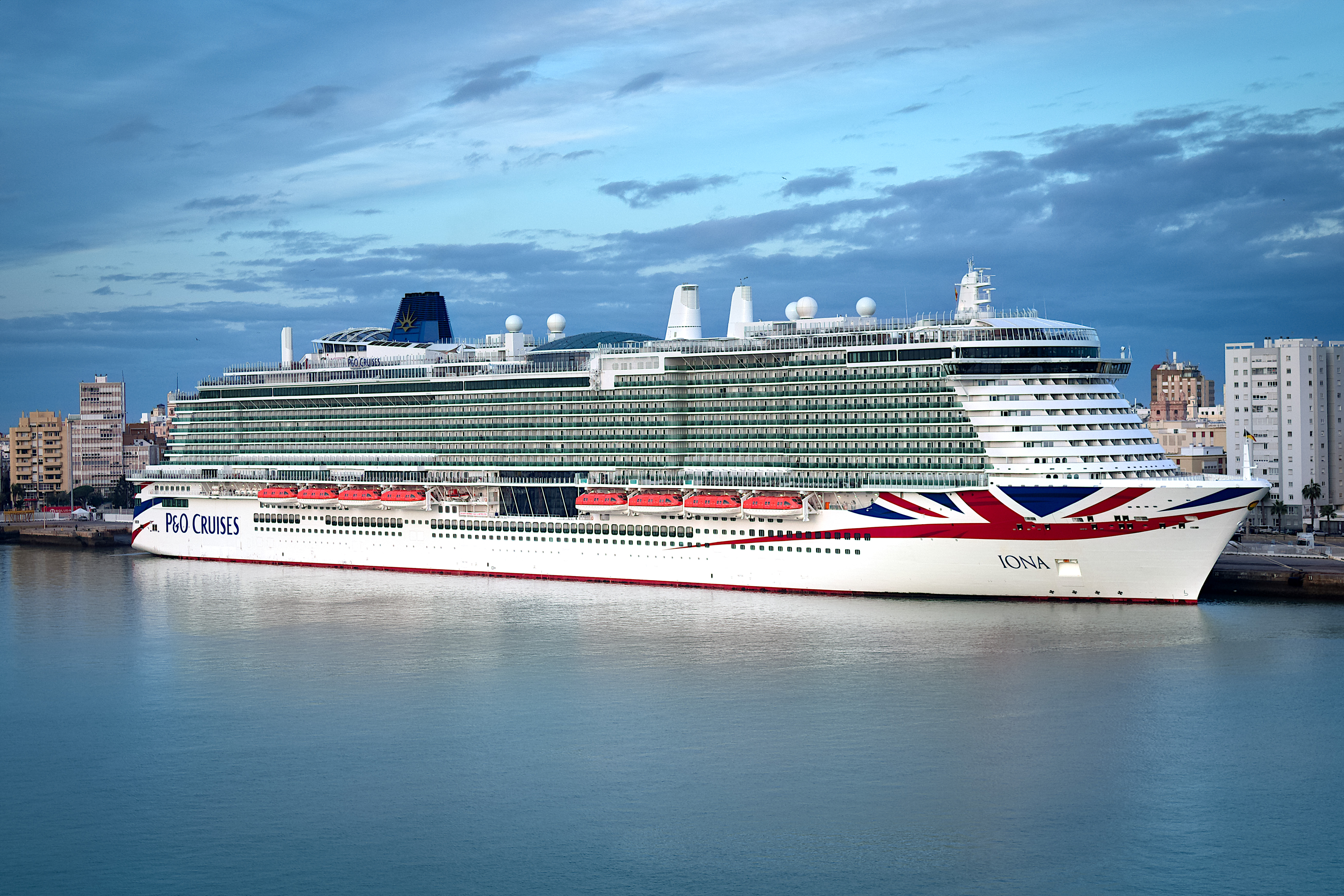
- Iona in Cádiz, 2022

History

Bermuda
- Name: Iona
- Owner: Carnival Corporation & plc
- Operator: P&O Cruises
- Port of registry: (United Kingdom) Southampton, U.K. (2020-2025); Hamilton, Bermuda (2025-present)
- Ordered: 6 September 2016
- Builder: Meyer Werft; Papenburg, Germany
- Cost: £730 million
- Yard number: S. 710
- Laid down: 29 May 2019
- Launched: 18 February 2020
- Sponsored by: Dame Irene Hays
- Christened: 16 May 2021
- Completed: 9 October 2020
- Acquired: 9 October 2020
- Maiden voyage: 7 August 2021
- Identification: Call sign: ZCHG9; IMO number: 9826548; MMSI number: 310857000
- Status: In service

General characteristics
- Class & type: Excellence-class cruise ship
- Tonnage: 184,089 GT
- Displacement: 87,306 t (85,927 long tons; 96,238 short tons)
- Length: 344.08 m (1,128 ft 10 in)
- Beam: 42 m (137 ft 10 in)
- Height: 69.3 m (227 ft 4 in)
- Draft: 8.8 m (28 ft 10 in)
- Decks: 19
- Installed power: Total Installed Power: 61.7 MW (82,700 hp)
- Propulsion: 2 × 18.5 MW (24,800 hp)
- Speed: Service speed: 20 knots (37 km/h; 23 mph)
- Capacity: 6,685 Max passengers
- Crew: 1,762 Crew

MS Iona is an Excellence-class cruise ship in service for P&O Cruises, a subsidiary of Carnival Corporation & plc. Built by German shipbuilder Meyer Werft in Papenburg, she was delivered in October 2020 at a cost of £730 million. At 184,089 GT, Iona became the largest cruise ship commissioned for P&O and the British market upon delivery until sister ship Arvia (measuring 185,581 GT) was delivered in 2022. Iona was floated out on 18 February 2020 and delivered eight months later on 9 October amid the COVID-19 pandemic, which delayed her debut by more than a year until 7 August 2021, when she sailed her maiden voyage from Southampton.

== Design ==
Iona has 17 different eateries, including eight restaurants designated as 'select dining', and 12 different bars. She also has 16 whirlpools and 4 swimming pools, one of which is housed under SkyDome, an entertainment venue topped by a 105-ton, 340-pane, 970-square-metre glass dome with a retractable stage for shows. The ship's centre also includes a three-deck atrium flanked by triple-deck glass panels projecting outwards.

Iona has 19 total decks, a length of 344.5 metres (1,130 ft), and a beam of 42 metres (138 ft). Maximum power is rated at 61.7 megawatts (82,700 hp). Total propulsion power is rated at 37 megawatts (50,000 hp). Together, the power system gives the vessel a service speed of 17 knots (31 km/h; 20 mph). Iona has a passenger capacity of 5,206 guests and 1,762 crew. Powered by liquefied natural gas (LNG), Iona is designed to not emit sulphur dioxide emissions and soot particles.

== Construction ==
On 6 September 2016, Carnival Corporation announced that it had signed an agreement with Meyer Werft for a 5,200-passenger vessel for P&O, scheduled for a 2020 debut. The vessel, planned to be the largest in P&O's history, at approximately 180,000 GT, would also be powered by LNG, making her the first LNG-powered ship dedicated for the British market. It was later reported that the engine room unit for the LNG tanks for Iona was constructed separately at Meyer Werft's sister yard, Neptun Werft, in Rostock. On 27 October 2016, P&O announced that the public would be invited to name the new ship. On 24 May 2018, it was announced that the name Iona, after the Scottish island of Iona, had been chosen from 30,000 submissions.

On 25 April 2018, construction for the ship began with the steel-cutting ceremony in Papenburg. On 29 May 2019, the ship's keel was laid to mark the official assembly of the hull. At the ceremony, a bronze coin from Iona Abbey and a piece of green marble from Iona was laid under a keel block that measured 21.5 metres (71 ft) long, 19.4 metres (64 ft) wide, and 9.8 metres (32 ft) high, and weighed 461 tonnes (1,016,000 lb). The block was then lowered into the building dock. In August 2019, the 105-ton, 340-pane glass dome set to become the "Skydome" was raised onto the ship. By the end of the month, the bow and midsections were joined.

Iona was floated out of the dry dock on 14 February 2020. She went through final outfitting in wet dock before her River Ems conveyance to Eemshaven on 18 March 2020 and her sea trials in the North Sea were set to follow shortly after. However, on 20 March 2020, Meyer Werft announced that the ship had been moored in Bremerhaven and all interior work and trials would be halted, due to the COVID-19 pandemic. Later, on 26 March 2020, following discussions with Bremerhaven port and medical authorities, Meyer Werft explained that work would resume, but at a reduced pace, given the reduction in crew and resources. On 30 May 2020, Iona departed from Bremerhaven for Rotterdam for a sea trial and entered dry dock at Damen's Rotterdam shipyard on 2 June for continued inspection work. A second round of sea trials was later performed along the Norwegian coast following the dry dock. Originally scheduled for spring 2020, the delivery date was further postponed to June 2020 and August 2020 before Iona was ultimately delivered on 9 October 2020.

== Service history ==
Iona was originally scheduled to perform her maiden voyage on 14 May 2020. The nine-night round-trip voyage from Southampton was to sail to the Norwegian fjords, calling in Stavanger, Olden, Hellesylt, Geiranger, and Bergen. The ship was scheduled to be christened on 4 July 2020 in Southampton before inaugurating a week-long celebration on the ship. However, on 23 April 2020, P&O announced that the pandemic forced the suspension of its operations and postponed the ship's debut and inaugural festivities. A year later, Iona was christened by Dame Irene Hays on 16 May 2021 in Southampton at a ceremony led by Gary Barlow and Jo Whiley.

Iona was originally scheduled to sail cruises to the Norwegian fjords from Southampton for her maiden season. In March 2021, P&O announced that the ship's maiden voyage would be 7 August 2021 along the Inner Hebrides before operating week-long voyages through September. Due to the United Kingdom's pandemic travel restrictions, all voyages during the inaugural season were exclusive to UK residents. Iona later spent her maiden winter months in the Canary Islands and Northern Europe before transitioning to the Norwegian fjords during the following summer and subsequent summers.

In October 2023, following the Heligoland ship collision, P&O confirmed that Iona had been in the area and was involved in the subsequent search.

In January 2025, Iona made her inaugural visit to the Caribbean from Southampton, in between her regular winter deployment to the Canary Islands and Northern Europe.

In February 2025, Iona suffered a norovirus outbreak off the coast of Belgium that led to a staff shortage and the cancellation of some onboard entertainment, with P&O offering full refunds to those unable to partake in scheduled offshore excursions due to the illness.

In October 2025, Iona had a refurb on drydock at Rotterdam. The ship departed from Rotterdam on October 21 and arrived at Southampton the next day.
