= SS Canberra =

Ocean liner

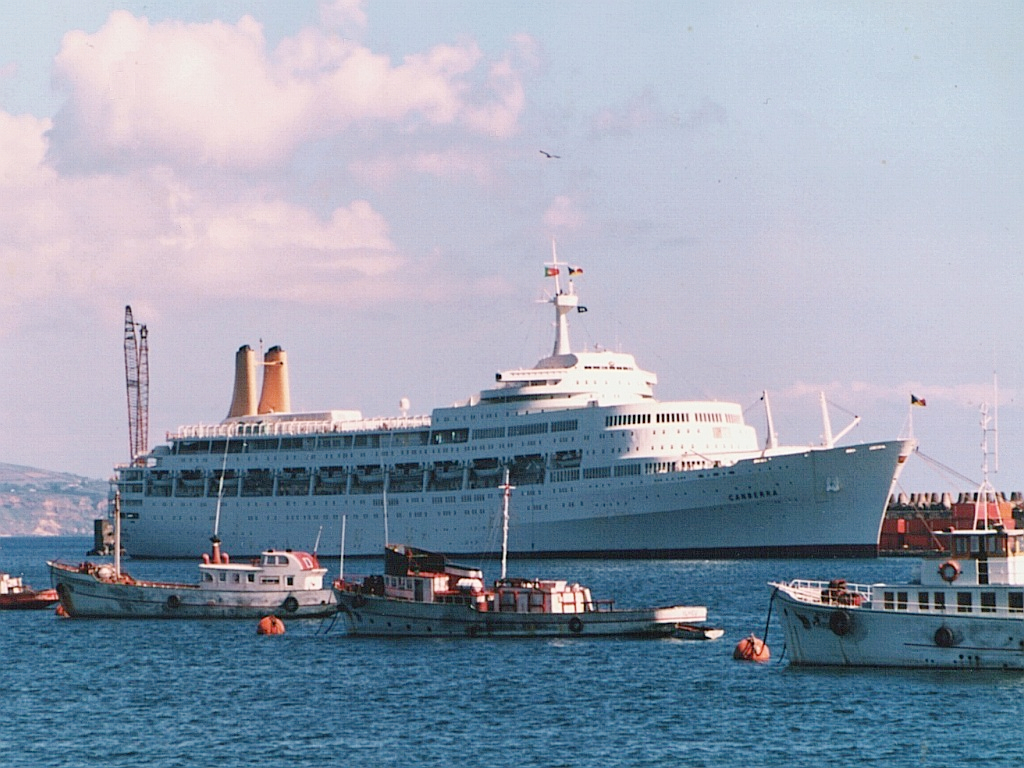
- Canberra in 1984

History

United Kingdom
- Name: Canberra
- Namesake: City of Canberra, Australia
- Owner: 1961–88: Peninsular & Oriental Steam Navigation Co.; 1988–91: P&O Lines (Shipowners) Ltd.; 1991–97: Abbey National March Leasing (1) Ltd. (leased back by P&O)
- Operator: 1961–66: P&O–Orient Lines; 1966–71: P&O Lines; 1971–86: P&O Passenger Division; 1986–92: Canberra Cruises Ltd.; 1992–94: P&O Cruise Fleets Services Ltd.; 1994–97: P&O Cruises (UK) Ltd.
- Port of registry: (United Kingdom) London
- Route: Southampton–Sydney via Suez Canal, thence Sydney–Vancouver (1973, Cruising)
- Ordered: 20 December 1956
- Builder: Harland & Wolff, Belfast
- Cost: £17 million
- Yard number: 1621
- Laid down: 23 September 1957
- Launched: 16 March 1960
- Sponsored by: Pattie Menzies
- Completed: May 1961
- Maiden voyage: 2 June 1961
- Out of service: 10–31 October 1997 (final voyage)
- Identification: Call sign: GBVC; IMO number: 5059953; official number 302649
- Nickname(s): The Great White Whale
- Honours and awards: Falklands War
- Fate: Scrapped at Gadani Ship Breaking Yard, Pakistan, 1997–98

General characteristics
- Type: Ocean liner
- Tonnage: 1961: 45,270 gross register tons; 1962: 45,733 gross register tons; 1968: 44,807 gross register tons; 1994: 49,073 gross tons
- Length: 820 feet (250 m)
- Beam: 103 feet (31 m)
- Draught: 35.5 feet (10.8 m)
- Propulsion: Main: Two British Thomson-Houston (AEI) synchronous three-phase, 6,000-volt air-cooled electric motors providing 85,000 hp (63,000 kW); power supplied by two 43,180 hp (32,200 kW) steam turbine-driven alternators; twin screws; Auxiliary: Four steam turbines, each driving a 1,500 kW, 440 V, 3 Phase, 60 Hz alternator and a tandem-driven 300 kW exciter for the propulsion alternators
- Speed: Trials: 29.27 kn (54.2 km/h; 33.7 mph); 1961–73: 27.5 kn (50.9 km/h; 31.6 mph); 1973–97: 23.50 kn (43.5 km/h; 27.0 mph)
- Capacity: 150,000 square feet (14,000 m^{2}) of cargo
- Complement: 1961–73: 548 first class, 1,690 tourist class, 1973–97: 1,500 one class
- Crew: 1961–73: 900, 1973–97: 795

SS Canberra was an ocean liner, which later operated on cruises, in the P&O fleet from 1961 until 1997. Built by Harland & Wolff in Belfast, Northern Ireland, it was named after the Australian city of Canberra. Launched on 16 March 1960 it entered service in May 1961. It was scrapped in 1997.

== History ==
=== Construction ===
P&O had placed an order for plans for two new ocean liners, one with Harland & Wolff for £17 million in 1956. On 23 September 1957, on Queen's Island, Belfast, the keel was laid. She had a gross tonnage of 45,733 GRT and dimensions of 819 feet (250 m) by 103 feet (31 m).

Pattie Menzies, wife of the Prime Minister of Australia christened the ship. Canberra was launched on 17 March 1960. She began sea trials before taking up her maiden voyage in June 1961.

The SS Canberra was the last ocean liner built by Harland & Wolff. It was also the shipyard's largest ship built since the White Star Line's Britannic.

=== Ocean liner ===
P&O commissioned Canberra to operate the combined P&O–Orient Line service between the United Kingdom and Australasia and designed her to carry 548 first-class passengers and 1,650 tourist class. Too big for Tilbury she was based at Southampton. Her first voyage set out on 2 June 1961 through the Suez Canal and called at Colombo, Fremantle, Melbourne, Sydney, Auckland, Suva, Honolulu, San Francisco and Los Angeles returning to Southampton by the same ports. By mid-1963 she had spent many months in dry dock in Southampton and in the builder's yard for repairs to her electrical and mechanical systems.

The era of mass air travel had begun by the time the Canberra was laid down and air travel prices fell relentlessly in the early 1960s to challenge P&O's lowest fares. In the second half of 1962 Canberra made a short cruise from Southampton followed by two more to New York. More cruises followed but nevertheless most of the ship's first decade was spent on the Australia run.

=== Cruises ===
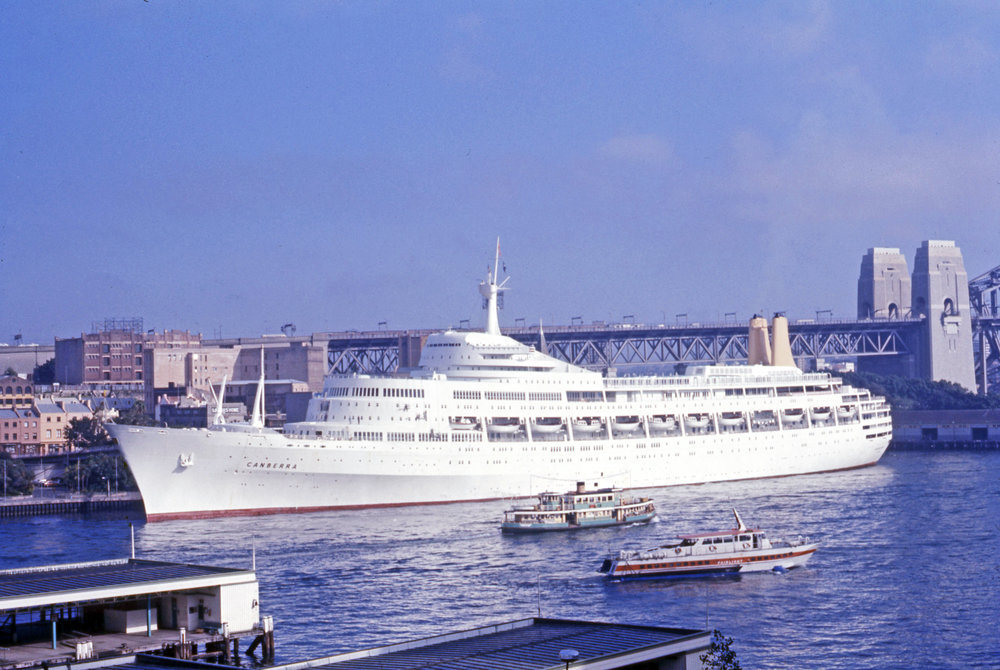
Canberra in Sydney, Australia in 1974

At the end of 1972 she was withdrawn and refitted to carry 1,500 single-class passengers on cruises. Unusually, this transition from an early life as a purpose-built ocean liner to a long and successful career in cruising, occurred without any major external alterations, and with only minimal internal and mechanical changes over the years. One of her public rooms included a 'Cricketers Tavern', which contained a collection of bats and ties from cricket clubs all over the world; she also had the William Fawcett reading/writing room, named for the first P&O ship.

In 1961, while still a student at the Royal College in London, the now famous British artist David Hockney was commissioned to create a mural for the 'Pop Inn', a special lounge for teenagers on board. Hockney graffitied and drew on the walls for five days and the fee earned assisted him to travel to New York for the first time.

=== Engineering ===
Like RMS Strathnaver and RMS Strathaird that she replaced on the Tilbury–Brisbane route, Canberra had turbo-electric transmission. Instead of being mechanically coupled to her propeller shafts, Canberra's steam turbines drove large electric alternators that provided current for electric motors that, in turn, drove the vessel's twin propellers. They were the most powerful steam turbo-electric units ever installed in a passenger ship; at 42,500 hp (31,700 kW) per shaft, they surpassed SS Normandie's 40,000 hp (30,000 kW) on each of her four shafts. This would give her a speed of about 27.25 knots (50.47 km/h). She also had a bow propeller for manoeuvring in port and docking manoeuvres. She was also the first British passenger liner to use alternating current as power.

There are several operational and economical advantages to such electrical de-coupling of a ship's propulsion system, and it became a standard element of cruise ship design in the 1990s, over 30 years after Canberra entered service. However, diesel engine and gas turbine driven alternators are the primary power source for most modern electrically propelled ships.

Canberra had a bulbous bow, two sets of stabilizers, and two funnels side-by-side. The lifeboats, which were made from glass fibre, were placed three decks lower than usual for ships of her type, and were recessed into the hull to allow improved view from the passenger decks.

The iconic spiral staircase and entrance halls in Australian walnut were designed by Hugh Casson and created by H.H. Martyn & Co.

=== Falklands War ===
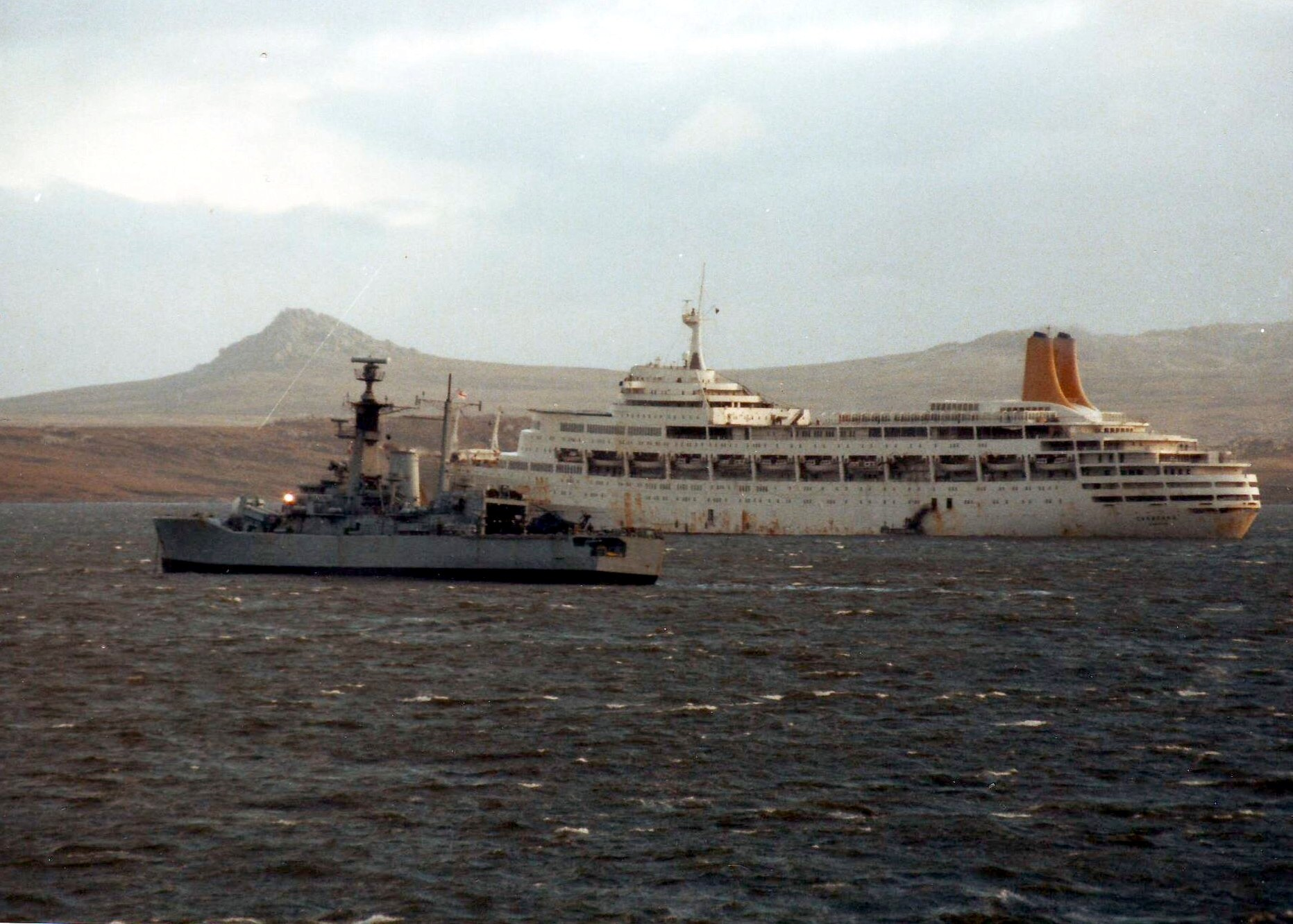
HMS Andromeda and Canberra off Port Stanley, Falkland Islands, just after the surrender of Argentine forces on 14 June 1982

On 2 April 1982, the Argentinian military junta declared possession of the Islas Malvinas and invaded the British Falkland Islands. At the time, Canberra was cruising in the Mediterranean. The next day, her captain Dennis Scott-Masson received a message asking his time of arrival at Gibraltar, which was not on his itinerary. When he called at Gibraltar, he learnt that the Ministry of Defence (MoD) had requisitioned Canberra for use as a troopship. Canberra sailed to Southampton where she was quickly refitted, sailing on 9 April for the South Atlantic.

Nicknamed the Great White Whale, Canberra proved vital in transporting 3 Commando Brigade to the islands more than 9,000 nautical miles (17,000 km) from the United Kingdom. Canberra was sent to the heart of the conflict.

Canberra anchored in San Carlos Water on 21 May as part of the landings by British forces to retake the islands. Although her size and white colour made her an unmissable target for the Argentine Air Force, Canberra, if sunk, would not have been completely submerged in the shallow waters at San Carlos. However, the liner was not badly hit in the landings as the Argentine pilots tended to attack the warships instead of the supply and troop ships. After the war, Argentine pilots said they were told not to hit Canberra, as they mistook her for a hospital ship. Hospital ships must be painted white, as Canberra always had been, but must also fly a Red Cross flag.

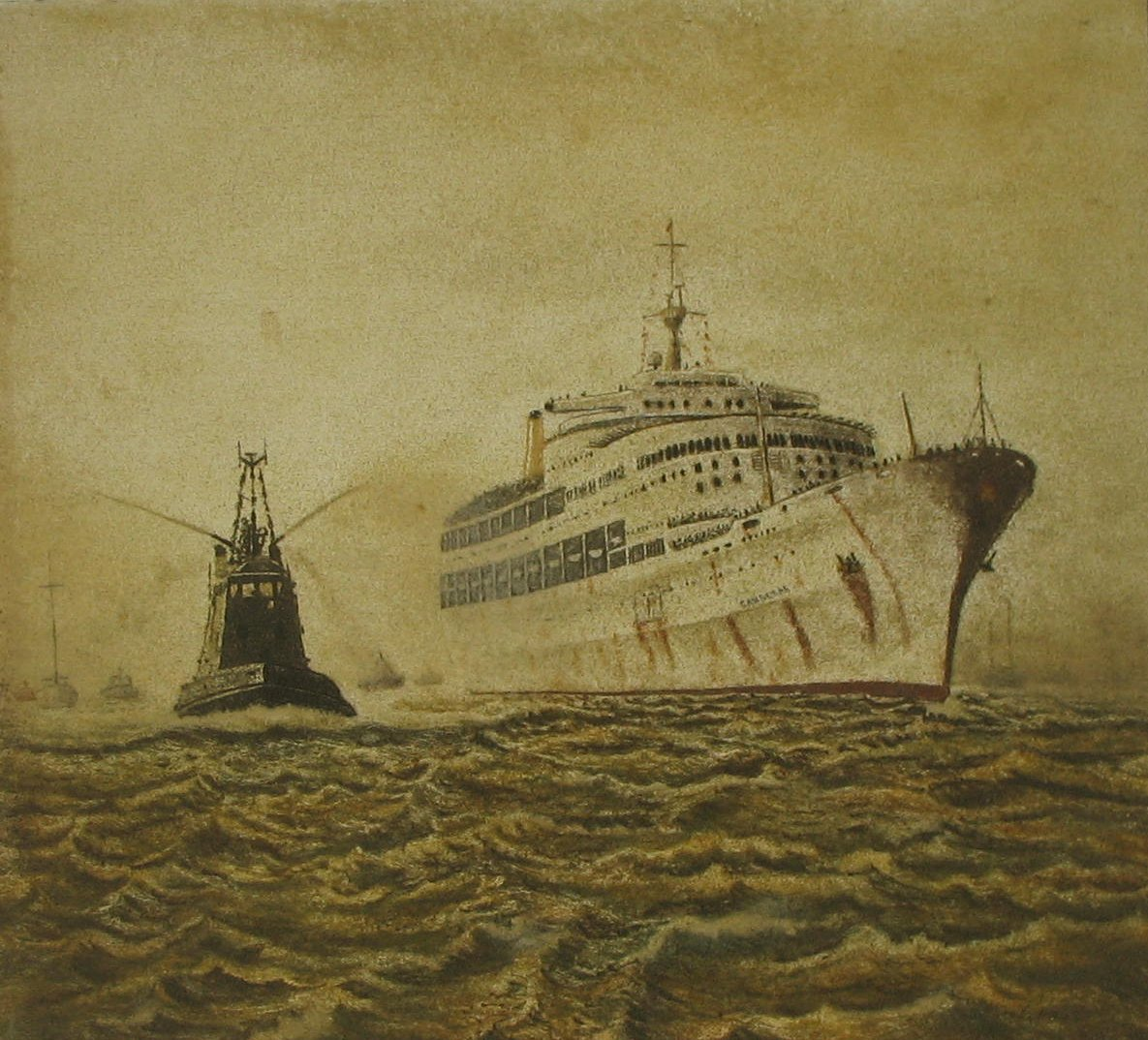
A painting of SS Canberra's return to Southampton from the Falklands

Canberra then sailed to South Georgia, where 3,000 troops were transferred from Queen Elizabeth 2. They were landed at San Carlos on 2 June. When the war ended, Canberra was used as a cartel to repatriate captured Argentine soldiers, landing them at Puerto Madryn, before returning to Southampton to a rapturous welcome on 11 July. Captain Scott-Masson, who had started his apprenticeship on the Shaw, Savill & Albion Line troopship Empire Deben in the late 1940s, was awarded a CBE and made an aide-de-camp to Queen Elizabeth II.

=== Final years ===
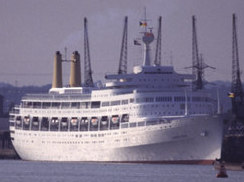
SS Canberra docked at Southampton in August 1994, three years before her retirement

After a lengthy refit, Canberra returned to civilian service as a cruise ship. Her role in the Falklands War made her very popular with the British public, and ticket sales after her return were elevated for many years as a result. In March 1986, the Golden Cockerel trophy was transferred from the old Oriana to the Canberra due to Oriana's retirement. Age and high running costs eventually caught up with the Canberra though, as she had much higher fuel consumption than most modern cruise ships. As refitting her to meet the new 1997 SOLAS regulations would have been very expensive, P&O opted to retire the old vessel.

On 25 June 1996 P&O Cruises announced that the Canberra would be retired at the end of 1997. Although Premier Cruise Line had made a bid for the old ship, P&O had already decided that they did not want Canberra to operate under a different flag and refused to sell her to Premier, as a result, Premier bought the similar looking Rotterdam. As a replacement for the Canberra, the 1988-built Star Princess was transferred to P&O Cruises and was renamed Arcadia. On 25 September 1997 the Golden Cockerel trophy was transferred from Canberra to the new Oriana while both ships were docked at Cannes, France.

Canberra was withdrawn from P&O service on 30 September 1997 and sold for scrapping on 10 October 1997, leaving for Gadani Ship Breaking Yard, Pakistan on 31 October 1997. Her deep draft meant that she could not be beached as far as most ships, and due to her solid construction the scrapping process took nearly a year instead of the estimated three months, being totally scrapped by the end of 1998.

== Gallery ==
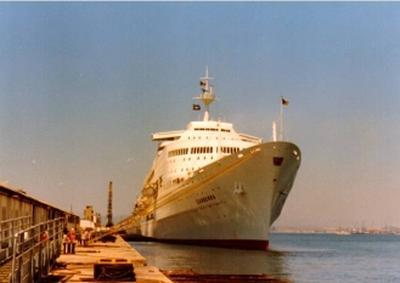
Canberra in Gibraltar August 1980 cruise 016

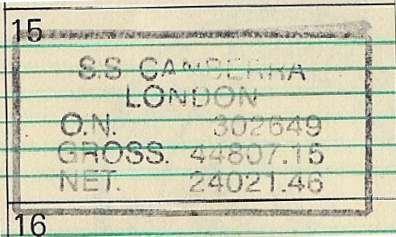
Canberra's official stamp

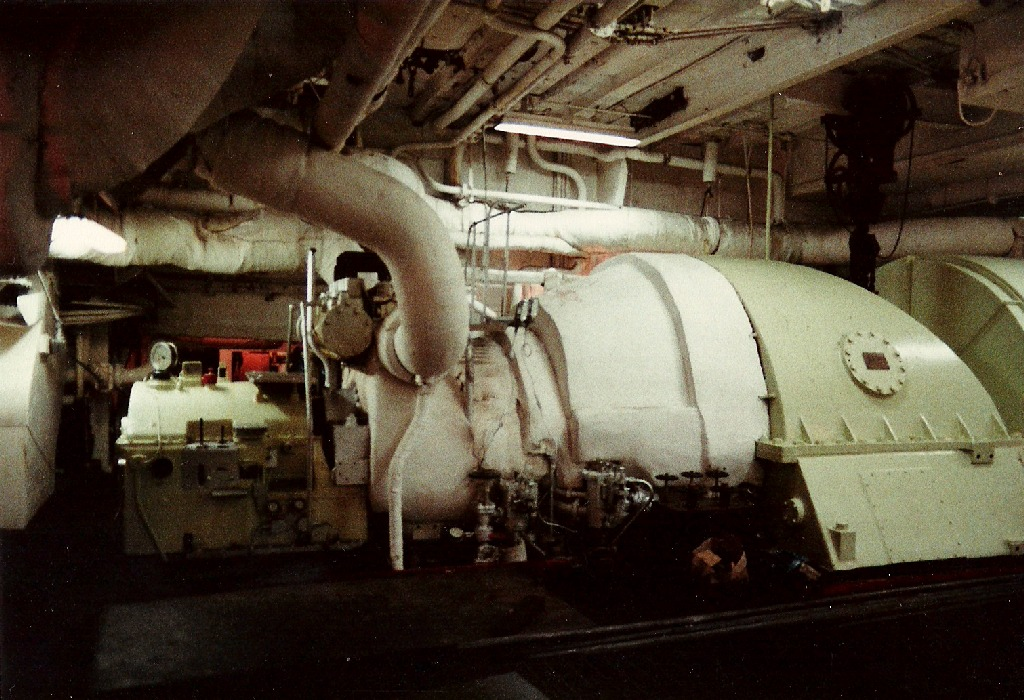
Canberra port main steam turbine

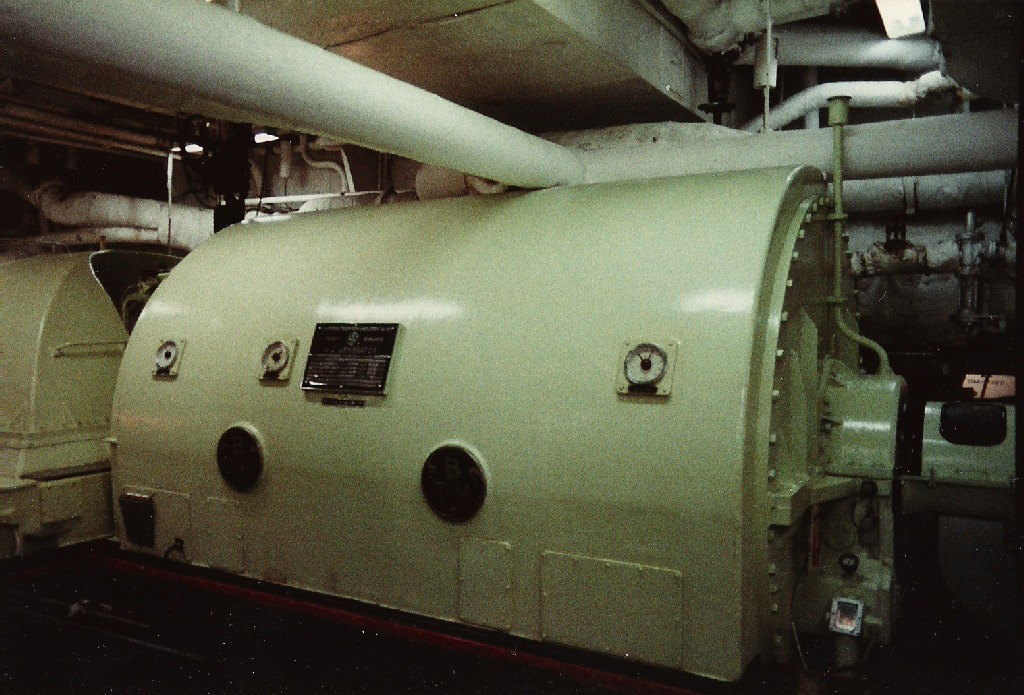
Canberra port main propulsion alternator

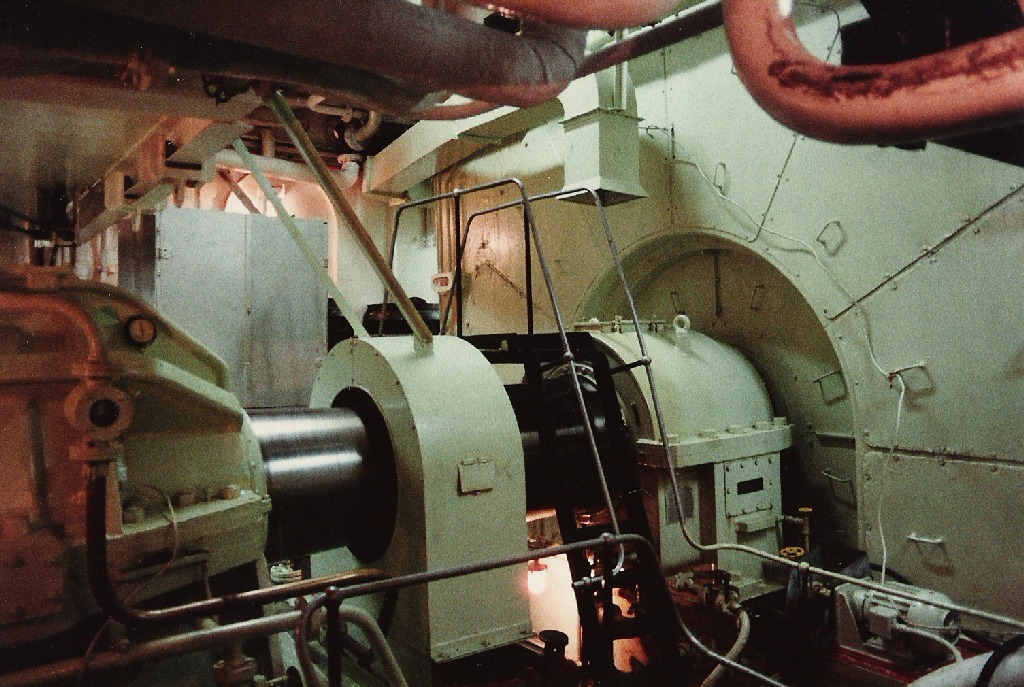
Canberra port main propulsion motor

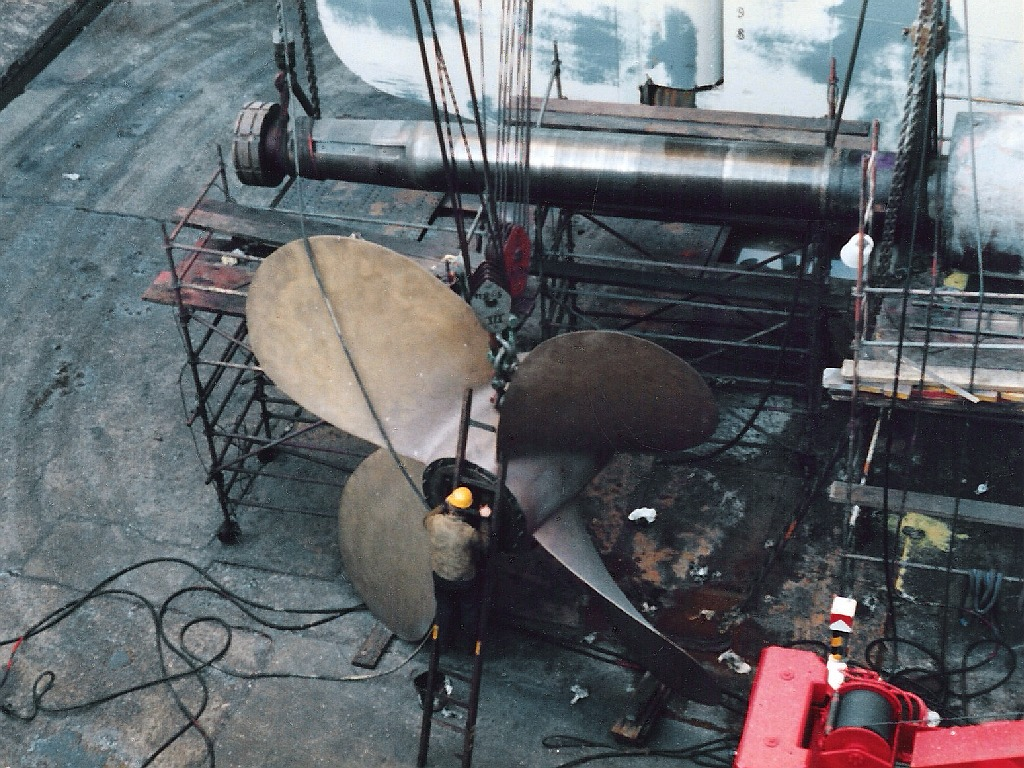
Canberra starboard tail shaft and propeller

== Media ==
- An edition of The Rank Organisation film series Look at Life - "Shape of a Ship". Featured the SS Canberra whilst she was still being constructed. The programme also described the changes in ship design that were being implemented at the time.
- British singer/songwriter John Paul Young emigrated to Sydney, Australia on this ship on Australia Day, 26 January 1962 at age 11.
- SS Canberra is the liner where, in the James Bond film Diamonds Are Forever, Mr. Wint and Mr. Kidd try to kill Bond.
- The singer/songwriter Gerard Kenny released "Farewell Canberra" in 1997, which was written especially for the last voyage and a tribute to SS Canberra. The song mentions the ship giving a home and comfort to the Falklands soldiers who were "so brave and alone" and that for the many people who travelled on Canberra, she remains "always in our memory" and "our wonderful home on the sea".
- Part of the TV mini-series Melissa by Alan Bleasdale starring Tim Dutton, Jennifer Ehle, and Julie Walters was filmed on board during the ship's last voyage from Madeira.

== Canberra Bar ==
A bar, known as the "Canberra Bar", was located at the corner of Scrabo Street and Station Street, in Queen's Quay, Belfast. It served the nearby shipyard workers and dockers from the coal quay. A large glass mural picturing the SS Canberra was located behind the bar. Due to redevelopments in the area, the Canberra Bar was demolished in the 1990s.
