= Radiance of the Seas =

Cruise ship built in 2001

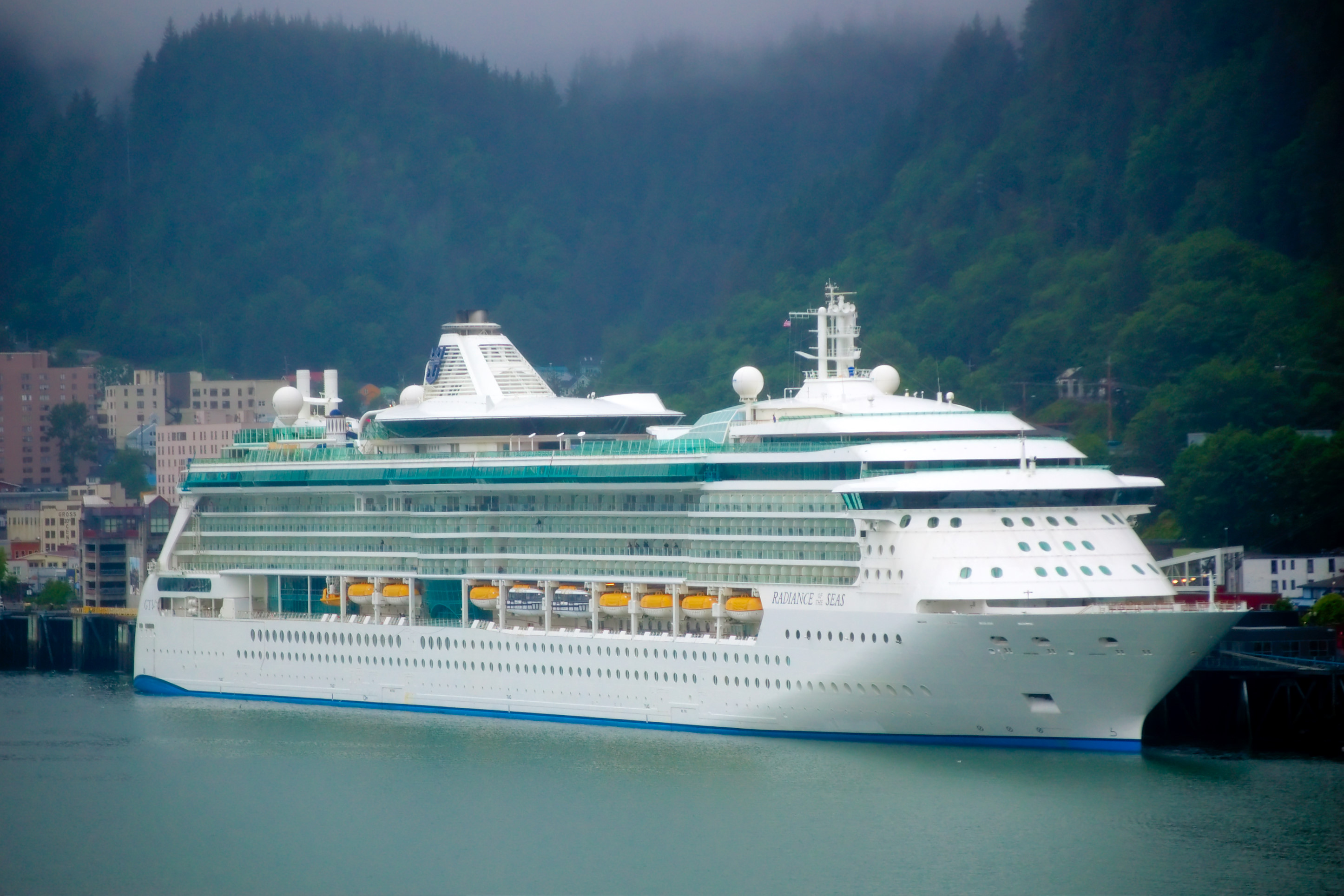
- Radiance of the Seas in Juneau, Alaska, 2011

History

Bahamas
- Name: Radiance of the Seas
- Owner: Radiance of the Seas Inc.
- Operator: Royal Caribbean International
- Port of registry: 2001–2002: Monrovia, Liberia; 2002 onwards: Nassau, Bahamas
- Builder: Meyer Werft, Papenburg, Germany
- Cost: 350 million
- Yard number: 655
- Laid down: 24 June 1998
- Launched: 15 June 2000
- Christened: 6 April 2001 by Margot L. Pritzker
- Completed: 9 March 2001
- Maiden voyage: 7 April 2001
- In service: 2001–present
- Identification: Call sign: C6SE7; DNV ID: 21562; IMO number: 9195195; MMSI number: 311319000
- Status: In service

General characteristics
- Class & type: Radiance-class cruise ship
- Tonnage: 90,090 GT
- Length: 293.2 m (961 ft 11 in)
- Beam: 32.2 m (105 ft 8 in)
- Height: 63 m (206 ft 8 in)
- Draft: 8.5 m (27 ft 11 in)
- Decks: 13 (12 guest accessible)
- Speed: 25 knots (46 km/h; 29 mph)
- Capacity: 2,501 passengers
- Crew: 859

GTS Radiance of the Seas is a cruise ship owned and operated by Royal Caribbean International. She is the lead ship of the Radiance class, which includes Jewel of the Seas, Brilliance of the Seas and Serenade of the Seas. All of the Radiance-class ships have a gas turbine powertrain, which produces higher efficient speeds than other cruise ships, and emissions to the air are much lower than cruise ships powered by diesel engines.

== Construction and career ==
Built in 2001, the ship cost Royal Caribbean International about 338 million dollars to build. The ship is considered to be one of the more environmentally-friendly but less fuel-efficient. As one of the Radiance-class ships it contained more glass than any other Royal Caribbean ship when it was launched. It has over 700 balcony staterooms, a two-level main dining room and a retractable glass roof over the solarium (adults-only) pool.

Radiance of the Seas was designed in Germany by Meyer Werft to cruise varied climates. The ship is faster than most cruise ships and has the ability to maneuver with the combination of the Azipod propulsion system, the bow thrusters, and the dynamic positioning system. The ship is economically efficient through the design of the power plant consisting of two gas turbines and one steam turbine. The waste heat from each gas turbine is fed through a heat recovery steam generator, thus using the steam to power the steam turbine. Once electricity is generated from this power plant it then powers the external propulsion pods and thrusters.

The ship departed from the shipyard in January 2001 After the ship was drydocked at Blohm+Voss, Hamburg, the ship was delivered to Royal Caribbean on 9 March 2001. She was the biggest cruise ship built in Germany.

The ship's features include a $6 million art collection and gyroscopically stabilized pool tables. Royal Caribbean ships all include art in passenger areas; Radiance of the Seas has displayed art from over 100 artists around the world.

Radiance of the Seas is the first cruise ship to feature pool tables that are stabilized by a computer-controlled gyroscope. They adjust with the motion of the ship to keep the table-top level with the horizon. The vessel has the most glass of any Royal Caribbean ship. She has 10 dining choices, a rock-climbing wall, a mini-golf course, pools, and a water slide.

=== Itinerary ===
During the northern summer season, Radiance of the Seas operates in Alaska. When the ship is cruising in Alaska, guests are able to stand on the helipad to view the glaciers passed by the ship. In spring and fall, she visits the Hawaiian Islands, and in the winter season, the southern summer, she visits Australia and New Zealand. The inaugural Australian cruise of the performing arts on the Radiance of the Seas in November 2014 included, among others, Cheryl Barker, David Hobson, Teddy Tahu Rhodes, Simon Tedeschi, Elaine Paige, Marina Prior, and John Waters.

==== COVID-19 pandemic ====
The ship was ordered to leave Sydney by the New South Wales police under "Operation Nemesis" due to the COVID-19 pandemic. It was provisioned in Sydney on 3 April and left port without passengers on 4 April towards Singapore. She proceeded to Cyprus and was in hot lay-up in the Bay of Limassol from early 2020.

== Accidents and incidents ==
On 1 September 2023, Radiance of the Seas experienced a propulsion problem in Seward, Alaska, resulting in the cancellation of two consecutive 7-day cruises. It returned to service on 15 September 2023.

On 23 April 2024, Radiance of the Seas experienced a propulsion problem while cruising to Vancouver, British Columbia, resulting in the cancellation of multiple cruises, including one that occurred two days after boarding and not leaving port. Guests were compensated but left upset over the lack of communication about the cruise to nowhere.
