= Serenade of the Seas =

Radiance-class cruise ship

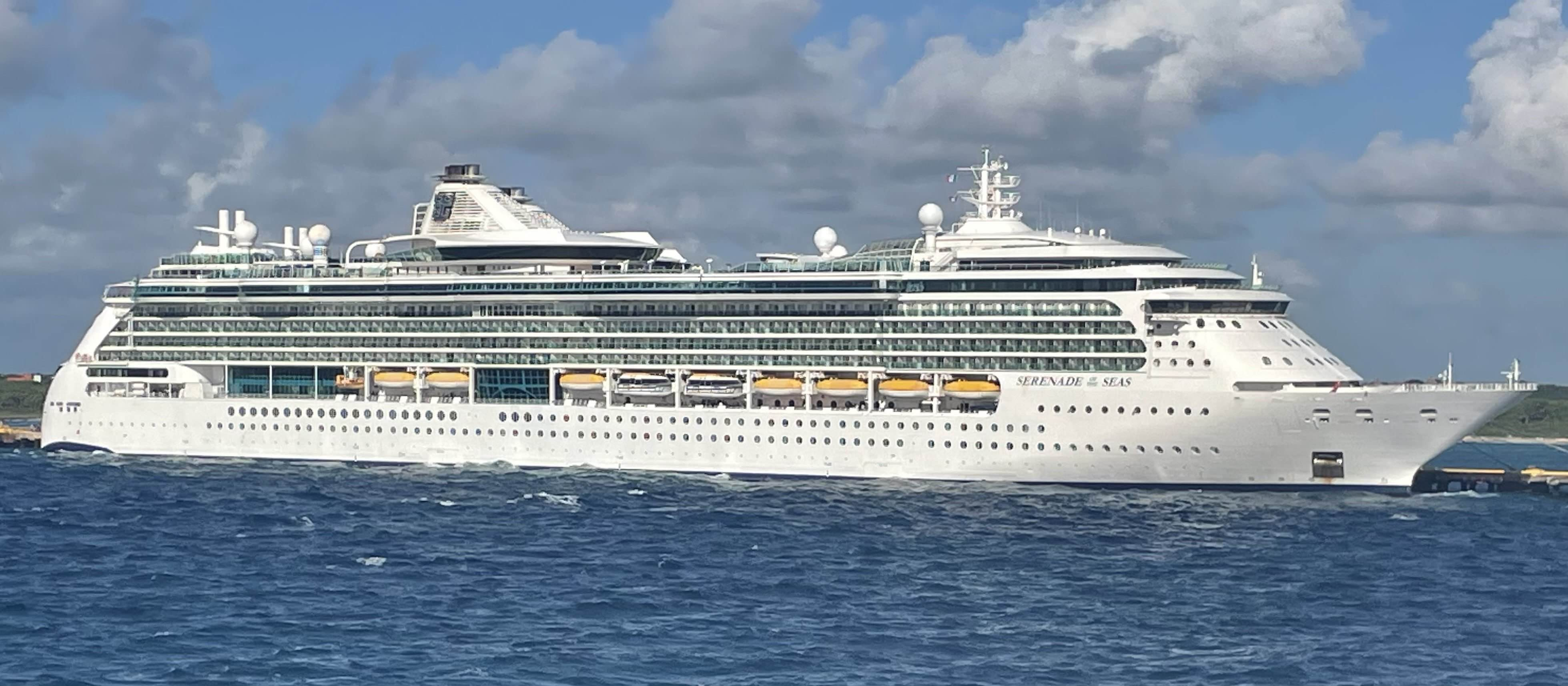
- Serenade of the Seas in Costa Maya, Mexico, 28 January 2025

History

Bahamas
- Name: Serenade of the Seas
- Owner: Royal Caribbean Group
- Operator: Royal Caribbean International
- Port of registry: Nassau, Bahamas
- Ordered: 7 December 1999
- Builder: Meyer Werft, Papenburg
- Yard number: 657
- Laid down: 26 September 2001
- Launched: 1 December 2002
- Completed: July 2003
- Acquired: 30 July 2003
- Maiden voyage: 1 August 2003
- In service: 2003–present
- Identification: Call sign: C6FV8; IMO number: 9228344; MMSI number: 311492000; DNV ID: 22826
- Status: In service

General characteristics
- Class & type: Radiance-class cruise ship
- Tonnage: 90,090 GT; 11,936 DWT
- Length: 293.2 m (961 ft 11 in)
- Beam: 39.8 m (130 ft 7 in) (max); 32.2 m (105 ft 8 in) (waterline)
- Height: 63 m (206 ft 8 in)
- Draft: 8.5 m (27 ft 11 in)
- Decks: 12
- Speed: 25 knots (46 km/h; 29 mph)
- Capacity: 2,490 passengers
- Crew: 891

GTS Serenade of the Seas is a Radiance-class cruise ship operated by Royal Caribbean International. She was completed in 2003.

== History ==
The ship was built at Meyer Werft yard in Papenburg, Germany and is registered in Nassau, Bahamas. She completed her maiden voyage on 25 August 2003. Other ships in the Radiance class include Jewel of the Seas, Brilliance of the Seas and Radiance of the Seas.

The ship was the very first Royal Caribbean cruise ship to visit Alaska since 2019; her first voyage there departed Seattle, Washington, on 19 July 2021.

After the River Ems Convenyance on 12 July 2003, the ship was delivered to Royal Caribbean on 30 July 2003.

=== Ultimate World Cruise ===
On 21 October 2021, Royal Caribbean announced that Serenade of the Seas would sail a 274-day itinerary, the longest offered by any cruise line, called the Ultimate World Cruise. Two GE LM2500's were added to the ship for the world cruise. She departed from Miami on 10 December 2023, and had visited 65 countries, including Morocco, Australia, and Brazil. Prices for guests ranged from US$61,000 to US$112,000. The ship concluded her World Cruise in Miami on 10 September 2024.

== Layout ==
Serenade of the Seas is a gas-turbine cruise vessel. This type of system produces higher efficient speeds than other cruise ships, and lower emissions than diesel cruise ships, but its drawback is higher fuel consumption as well as the demand for higher quality fuel. She is 294 metres (964 ft 7 in) long, 32.3 metres (106 ft 0 in) wide, has a 8.5 metres (27 ft 11 in) draft, and has a cruising speed of 25 knots (46 km/h; 29 mph). There are 12 passenger decks, serviced by 9 passenger elevators (6 of which are glass and either look over the Centrum atrium or outside the ship through a glass wall). The ship holds 2,490 guests and 891 crew, and is powered by two smokeless gas turbines, each able to produce up to 25.25 MW (33,860 hp) of power. There are a total of 1,055 passenger cabins.

== Homeports ==
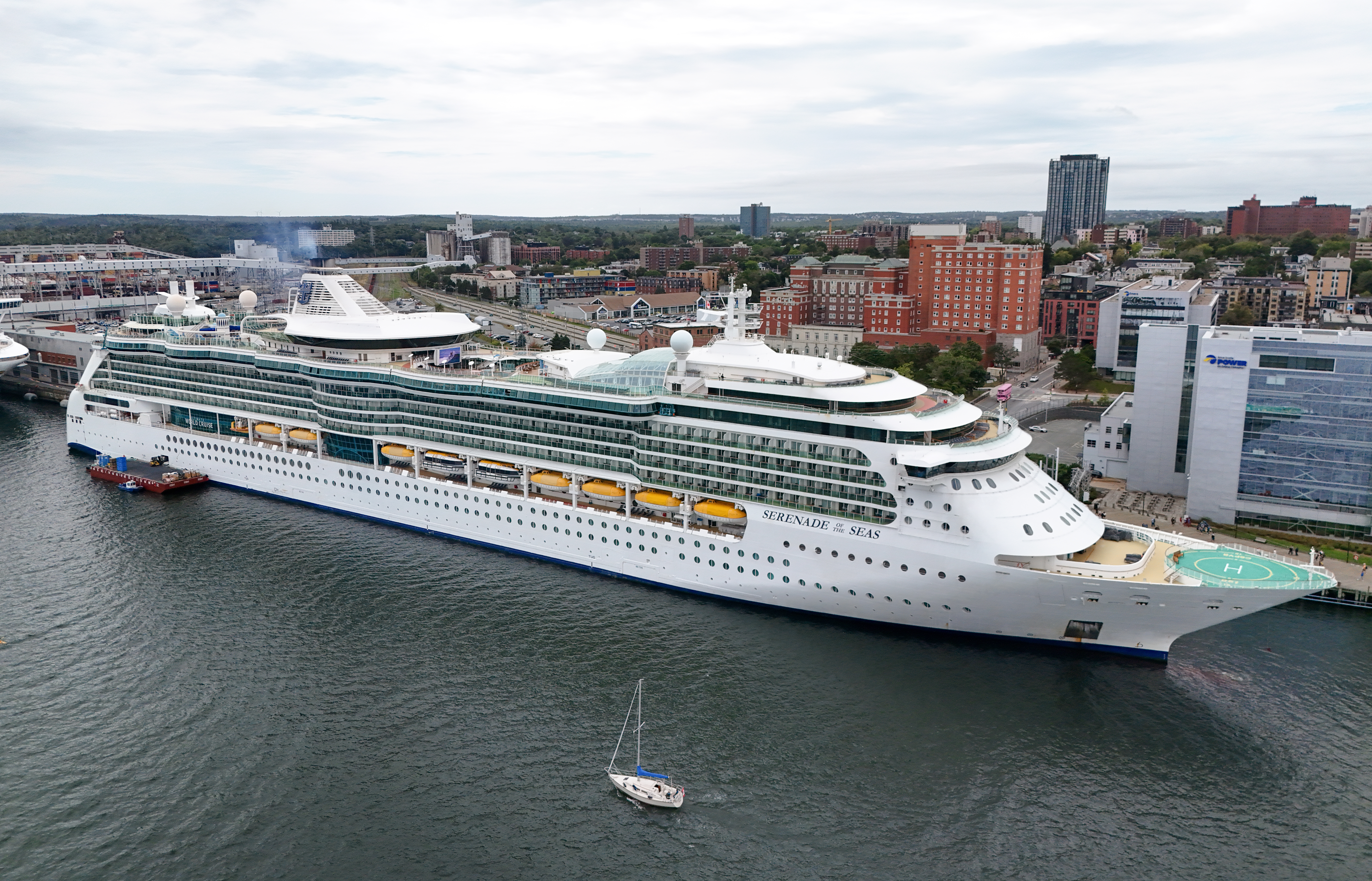
The Serenade of the Seas at the Port of Halifax, Halifax, Nova Scotia, on 1 September 2024.

Serenade of the Seas sails the Caribbean, departing from her home port of Tampa, Florida, during the winter months. During the summer months, Serenade of the Seas sails the Baltic Sea leaving from the home ports of Copenhagen, Denmark, or Stockholm, Sweden. Starting in August 2016, Serenade of the Seas started sailing out of Boston, Massachusetts until the beginning of October when the ship relocated back to Florida. Starting in May 2020, Serenade of the Seas was scheduled to sail out of Vancouver, British Columbia until the beginning of September when the ship relocated to Sydney, Australia, however, due to the COVID-19 pandemic, these sailings have been canceled.

Serenade of the Seas was the first major cruise ship to return to service in Alaska from Seattle, departing from Pier 91, Seattle on 19 July 2021, and then every Monday until 27 September 2021.

== See also ==
- Royal Caribbean International
- Royal Caribbean Group
