= Haunting Evidence =

American television series

- Genre: Documentary
- Country of origin: United States
- Original language: English
- No. of seasons: 3
- No. of episodes: 27

Original release
- Release: December 21, 2005 – October 25, 2008

Haunting Evidence is an American documentary television series created by Departure Films and executive produced by Max Weisman and Robyn Hutt. The program follows the travels of a psychic profiler, a spirit medium, and a paranormal investigator. The trio travels the United States investigating "cold case" homicide and missing persons cases. The premise of the series was that this "team of unconventional investigators" could shed new light on unsolved crimes.

The series began production in October 2005 and premiered on Court TV (now truTV) December 21, 2005 with a run of 9 episodes in Season 1. Season 2 premiered on June 20, 2007. There were four hour-long special episodes comprising Season 3. The series ended production after a total of 27 episodes, and is currently still broadcast in worldwide syndication as of 2019. The psychic-crime paranormal reality series features psychic profiler Carla Baron, medium John J. Oliver, and paranormal investigator Patrick Burns.

== Episodes ==
=== Season 1 ===
No.	Title	Subject	Original release date
1	"Mystery on the Appalachian Trail"	Julianne Williams & Laura Winans	December 21, 2005
2	"Mystery in the Ashes"	Tara Baker	December 21, 2005
3	"Forgotten Fiancée"	Amanda Tusing	June 14, 2006
4	"The Missing D.A."	Ray Gricar	June 21, 2006
5	"Hidden Truth"	Timothy Stone	July 5, 2006
6	"Missing Teacher"	Tara Grinstead	July 19, 2006
7	"Mystery in the Desert"	Katie Sepich	July 26, 2006
8	"Abduction at Comins Pond"	Molly Bish	August 2, 2006
9	"Lady of the Dunes"	Lady of the Dunes	August 9, 2006

=== Season 2 ===
No.	Title	Subject	Original release date
1	"Missing in Paradise: Natalee Holloway Parts 1 + 2"	Natalee Holloway	June 20, 2007
2	"Women of Calder Field"	Texas Killing Fields (location)	June 27, 2007
3	"Long Journey Home"	Russell Turcotte	July 4, 2007
4	"Buried Secrets"	James Lacouture	July 11, 2007
5	"Dupont Circle Mystery"	Joyce Chiang & Chandra Levy	July 18, 2007
6	"The Ruins at Land's End"	Kristen Modafferi	July 25, 2007
7	"Five Hundred Miles Away"	Judith Smith	August 1, 2007
8	"Deep in the Desert"	Diana Shawcroft & Jennifer Lueth	August 8, 2007
9	"Wiregrass Murders"	J.B. Beasley & Tracie Hawlett	August 15, 2007
10	"North Carolina Burning"	Vernon Shipman, Charles Glass & Louise Shumate	August 22, 2007
11	"Haunted in Villisca"	Villisca axe murders	August 29, 2007
12	"Deadly Detour"	Eric Keller	September 5, 2007
13	"Missing in Ohio"	Tony Luzio	September 12, 2007
14	"Mystery in the Countryside"	Les Johnson	September 19, 2007

=== Season 3 ===
No.	Title	Subject	Original release date
1	"The JonBenet Mystery"	Jon-Benet Ramsey	October 4, 2008
2	"Madeleine McCann"	Madeleine McCann	October 11, 2008
3	"Zodiac Killer"	Zodiac Killer	October 18, 2008
4	"George Allen Smith"	George Allen Smith	October 25, 2008

== Results ==
None of the cases investigated by the show were solved because of the show. Several cases were later closed by police work:

- Episode 107, "Mystery in the Desert", Season 1: the perpetrator of the crime, Gabriel Avila, was linked to Katie Sepich via DNA evidence, in December 2006.
- Episode 213, "Missing in Ohio", Season 2: Tony Luzio's body was found submerged in a pond in October 2014.
- Episode 106, "Missing Teacher", Season 1: Ryan Duke and Bo Dukes were charged with the murder of Tara Grinstead in 2017.
- Episode 209, "Wiregrass Murders", Season 2: Coley McCraney was charged in April 2019 with the murder of the two girls using DNA and genetic genealogy.
- Episode 109, "Lady of the Dunes", Season 1: the victim was identified as Ruth Marie Terry in 2022. Her husband was identified as the killer in 2023.
- Episode 102 "Mystery in the Ashes", Season 1: Eric Faust was arrested for the murder of Tara Baker in May 2024.
