= Radiance-class cruise ship =

Royal Caribbean ships built 2001–2004

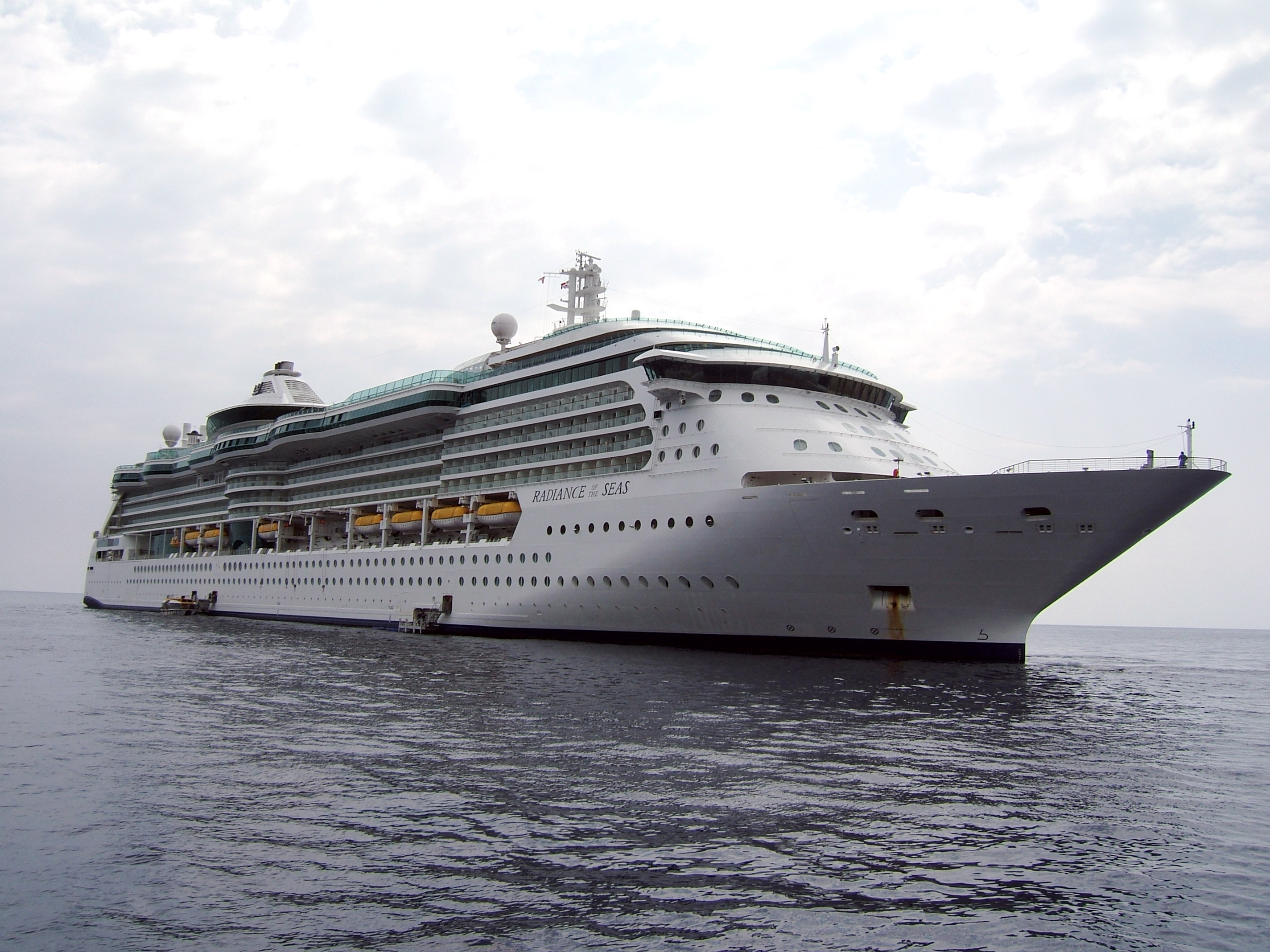
- Radiance of the Seas

Class overview
- Builders: Meyer Werft
- Operators: Royal Caribbean International
- Preceded by: Voyager class; Vision class
- Succeeded by: Freedom class
- Built: 1998–2004
- In service: 2001–present
- Completed: 4
- Active: 4

General characteristics
- Type: Cruise ship
- Tonnage: 90,090 GT
- Length: 962 ft (293 m)
- Beam: 105.6 ft (32.2 m)
- Height: 63 m (206 ft 8 in)
- Draft: 26.7 ft (8.1 m)
- Decks: 12
- Installed power: Gas turbines
- Speed: 25 knots (46 km/h; 29 mph)
- Capacity: 2,501 passengers
- Crew: 859

The Radiance class is a class of four cruise ships operated by Royal Caribbean built between 2001 and 2004 at Meyer Werft shipyard in Papenburg, Germany. The class was preceded by the Voyager class and succeeded by the Freedom class.

Radiance-class ships have a gross tonnage of 90,090, being smaller than the preceding Voyager class. Built for cruising in cooler climates, this class differs in design from the Voyager and Freedom classes, and some aspects influenced the Quantum class. The Radiance class is built to Panamax form factor, allowing them to pass through the Panama Canal. The power plant on all ships consists of environmentally friendlier but less fuel efficient gas turbines.

The Radiance-class ships have over three acres (12,000 m^{2}) of glass, glass exterior viewing elevators, over 700 balcony staterooms, two-level glass windowed dining rooms, alternative restaurants, a retractable glass roof over a pool, an outdoor pool, as well as the first self-leveling billiard tables at sea. During their refurbishment, the ships of this class have been refitted to incorporate the "Centrum Wow" events, which transformed the multi-level atrium into vertical theater for aerialists (aerial gymnasts). Two more ships of the class were cancelled.

Radiance-class ships have been plagued with propulsion issues, specifically impacting multiple cruises in September 2023 on Radiance of the Seas and in March and April 2024 on Brilliance of the Seas. No cause of the repeated mechanical failures have been announced on the 20+-year-old ships.

In April 2024 Radiance of the Seas suffered additional propulsion issues impacting multiple sailings, skipping a port on one sailing, and postponing departure of another before finally canceling the cruise all together. No cause of the issues plaguing the ship for the second time in twelve months were released and passengers were compensated for the two day cruise that never left port. Many were left frustrated back the lack of communication from Royal Caribbean.

== Ships ==
| Ship | Year built | Entered service with Royal Caribbean | Notes | Image |
|---|---|---|---|---|
| Radiance of the Seas | 2001 | March 10, 2001 | | |
| Brilliance of the Seas | 2002 | July 19, 2002 | | |
| Serenade of the Seas | 2003 | August 1, 2003 | | |
| Jewel of the Seas | 2004 | May 8, 2004 | | |

== Similar ships ==
- Spirit class - a similar class of Panamax ships operated by Carnival Cruise Lines and Costa Cruises.
- MV Arcadia - a similar Panamax ship operated by P&O Cruises.
- MS Queen Victoria - a similar Panamax sized ship operated by Cunard Line.
- Vista class - a similar class of Panamax ships operated by Holland America Line
- Signature-class cruise ship - a similar class of Panamax ships operated by Holland America Line
- Coral Princess and Island Princess - A similar set of Panamax ships operated by Princess Cruises
- Costa Luminosa and Costa Deliziosa - A set of Panamax ships operated by Costa Cruises derived from the Spirit and Vista-class designs.
