= Patrick Burns (paranormal investigator) =

American paranormal investigator (born 1968)

Patrick Lynn Burns
- Born: September 29, 1968 (age 57); Highland Park, Illinois, U.S.
- Occupations: Television presenter Paranormal investigator, photographer, tour guide
- Organization(s): gotghosts.net, [Got Ghosts!]

Patrick Lynn Burns (born September 29, 1968) is an American photographer and paranormal investigator, best known as star of the TruTV (formerly Court TV) series Haunting Evidence. He began to get media recognition after he was featured in an Emmy award-winning Turner documentary "Interact Atlanta – 'Ghost Hounds' ". Burns has attended paranormal enthusiast events held at various locations across the United States of America. He is also a professional photographer.

== Biography ==
Burns was born September 29, 1968, the youngest of four boys in Highland Park, Illinois, and grew up in Trout Valley, Illinois, where he graduated Cary-Grove High School in 1987.

After graduating high school, Burns enrolled in Columbia School of Broadcasting radio announcing curriculum. After completing the course of study, he worked in radio for a number of years.

Burns says that he had an uneventful childhood, with no exposure to paranormal activities, aside from what he read in books, until he was 18, at which time he began observing unusual phenomena. Several years later, while living in northern Wisconsin, he heard from some friends speak about the Paulding Spook Light that appears nightly on a desolate road near the town of Watersmeet, Michigan, in the upper peninsula region. Burns states that he briefly investigated, and quickly determined that it was being caused by distant car headlights and tail lights—the highway wrapped around and was exposed through the trees where it crossed a hill about 5 miles away, however the encounter was inspiration to pursue a career as a paranormal investigator.

Burns goes by the handle Ghostgeek in the paranormal community. He lectures across the United States of America at various paranormal conferences throughout the year, and at universities and colleges.

In 2008, he appeared in a bonus material excerpt "The Science of the Spirits" on the 25th anniversary DVD release of Poltergeist

In October 2010, his first book was published by Houghton Mifflin Harcourt entitled, The Other Side: A Teen's Guide To Ghost Hunting And The Paranormal, co-authored with his wife - young adult author, Marley Gibson.

In 2011, he appeared as a recurring guest judge on two episodes of the Travel Channel's Paranormal Challenge.

He is a professional photographer and shoots exclusively in infrared light.

Burns is married to author Marley Gibson. The two of them currently live in Savannah, Georgia, where they own and operate a walking ghost tour company. He is the father of two sons from a previous marriage.
