= Rhapsody of the Seas =

Cruise ship, launched 1996

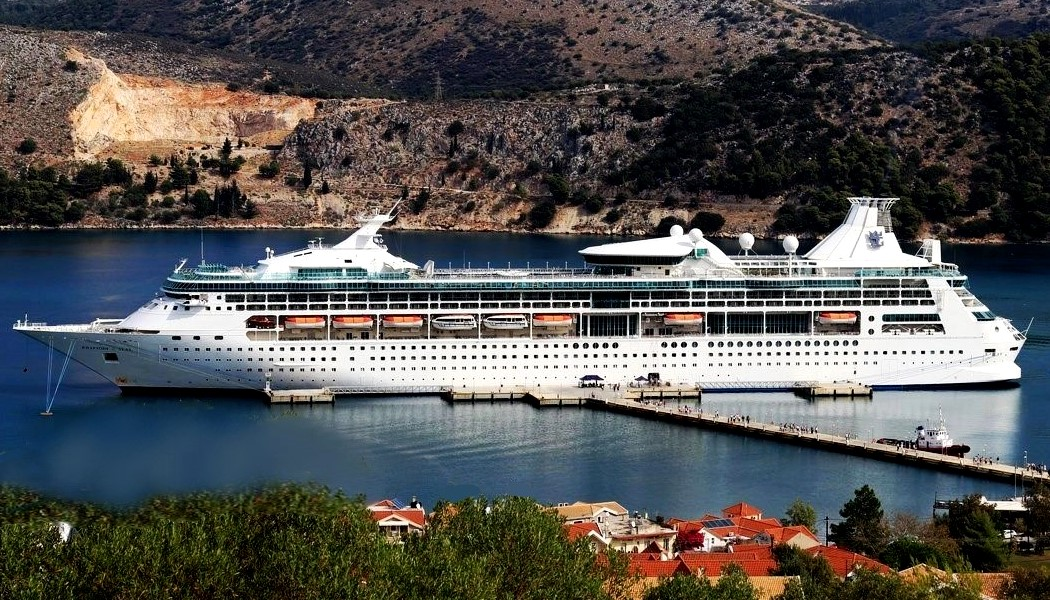
- Rhapsody of the Seas docked at Argostoli, Kefalonia in 2018

History

Bahamas
- Name: Rhapsody of the Seas
- Owner: Rhapsody of the Seas Inc.
- Operator: Royal Caribbean International
- Port of registry: 1997–2005: Oslo, Norway; 2005–present: Nassau, Bahamas
- Builder: Chantiers de l'Atlantique; Saint-Nazaire, France
- Yard number: E31
- Laid down: 11 December 1995
- Launched: 1 August 1996
- Completed: 22 April 1997
- Maiden voyage: 19 May 1997
- In service: 1997–present
- Identification: Call sign: C6UA2; IMO number: 9116864; MMSI number: 311805000
- Status: In Service

General characteristics
- Class & type: Vision-class cruise ship
- Tonnage: 78,878 GT; 46,560 NT; 8,439 DWT
- Length: 279 m (915 ft 4 in)
- Beam: 32 m (105 ft 0 in) (hull)
- Height: 59 m (193 ft 7 in)
- Draft: 8.30 m (27 ft 3 in)
- Depth: 15.85 m (52 ft 0 in)
- Decks: 14 (11 guest decks)
- Installed power: 4 × Wärtsilä 12V46C
- Propulsion: Diesel-electric, two shafts
- Speed: 22 knots (41 km/h; 25 mph)
- Capacity: 1,020 staterooms; 2,040 passengers (double occupancy)
- Crew: 772
- Notes: General characteristics as of February 2025

Rhapsody of the Seas is a Vision-class cruise ship operated by Royal Caribbean International.

== Areas of operation ==
After six years of sailing from Galveston, Texas, USA, Rhapsody of the Seas repositioned on a world trip in the autumn of 2007, traveling through the South Pacific to Australia where she remained for two months, before moving to Asia, operating cruises from Singapore, Hong Kong, Shanghai and Busan, South Korea. For the summer of 2008, Rhapsody of the Seas operated out of Seattle, Washington, USA, sailing to Alaska, USA, before repositioning back to Sydney, Australia for the winter of 2008/2009.

== Refit ==
In March 2012, the ship received a US$54 million dry dock refit which added additional cabins, an outdoor movie screen near the pool, new dining areas and a nursery.

A later retrofit, of unknown detail or cost, was completed in December 2016.

In late 2019, Rhapsody was in drydock in Cádiz, Spain for some routine maintenance, cosmetic improvements, and technology upgrades, but did not see any major reconfigurations.

== Incidents ==
- On 24 March 1998, 23-year-old passenger Amy Lynn Bradley disappeared without a trace aboard the ship when it was within two hours of docking at Curaçao, Antilles. Police investigations ruled out the possibility that she fell overboard and drowned or that she disappeared voluntarily, but failed to locate her.
- On New Year's Day, 2010, a 15-year-old American passenger was raped by a crew member. She had been seasick during the Australian–New Zealand round trip cruise and was resting alone in a cabin when a man wearing a bartender's uniform entered.
- In December 2013, an Australian passenger fell overboard during a round trip cruise to New Caledonia, with "an extensive search" eventually finding his body.
- On 25 April 2016, Rhapsody of the Seas was hit by a rogue wave en route to Santorini, Greece. It struck at 4 am, breaking the windows of six-passenger cabins and partially flooded other staterooms on decks 2 and 3. No serious injuries were reported by Royal Caribbean, and the ship continued on its 10-day cruise from Venice, Italy.
- On 19 September 2016, the ship severely listed after strong winds blew against the ship. A dozen large windows in the Viking Crown Lounge were reportedly broken as well as other onboard fixtures; however, there were no reported injuries by the cruise line and Rhapsody of the Seas continued to Santorini, Greece as scheduled.
- On 22 September 2019, a crew member died after going overboard while the ship was docked in the Croatian port of Dubrovnik. Royal Caribbean said the 35-year-old waiter had committed suicide but his family in India denied this.
- In April 2020, as the cruise industry was given a no sail order due to the spread of COVID-19, the Centers for Disease Control and Prevention reported that at least one person had tested positive for the virus within 14 days after disembarking from the ship the previous month.
- In October 2023, the United States State Department and the U.S. Embassy in Israel chartered the Rhapsody of the Seas to evacuate United States citizens and their families from Israel after the outbreak of the Gaza war.
- In September 2025 a passenger jumped overboard as the ship docked in Puerto Rico, facing both a bill for losses of US$16,000 in the onboard casino and a penalty for bringing $15,000 in cash (exceeding the $10,000 reporting limit) into the United States; the man was later arrested.
