= Tunxdorf =

Village in Lower Saxony, Germany

Coordinates: 53°05′N 7°19′E

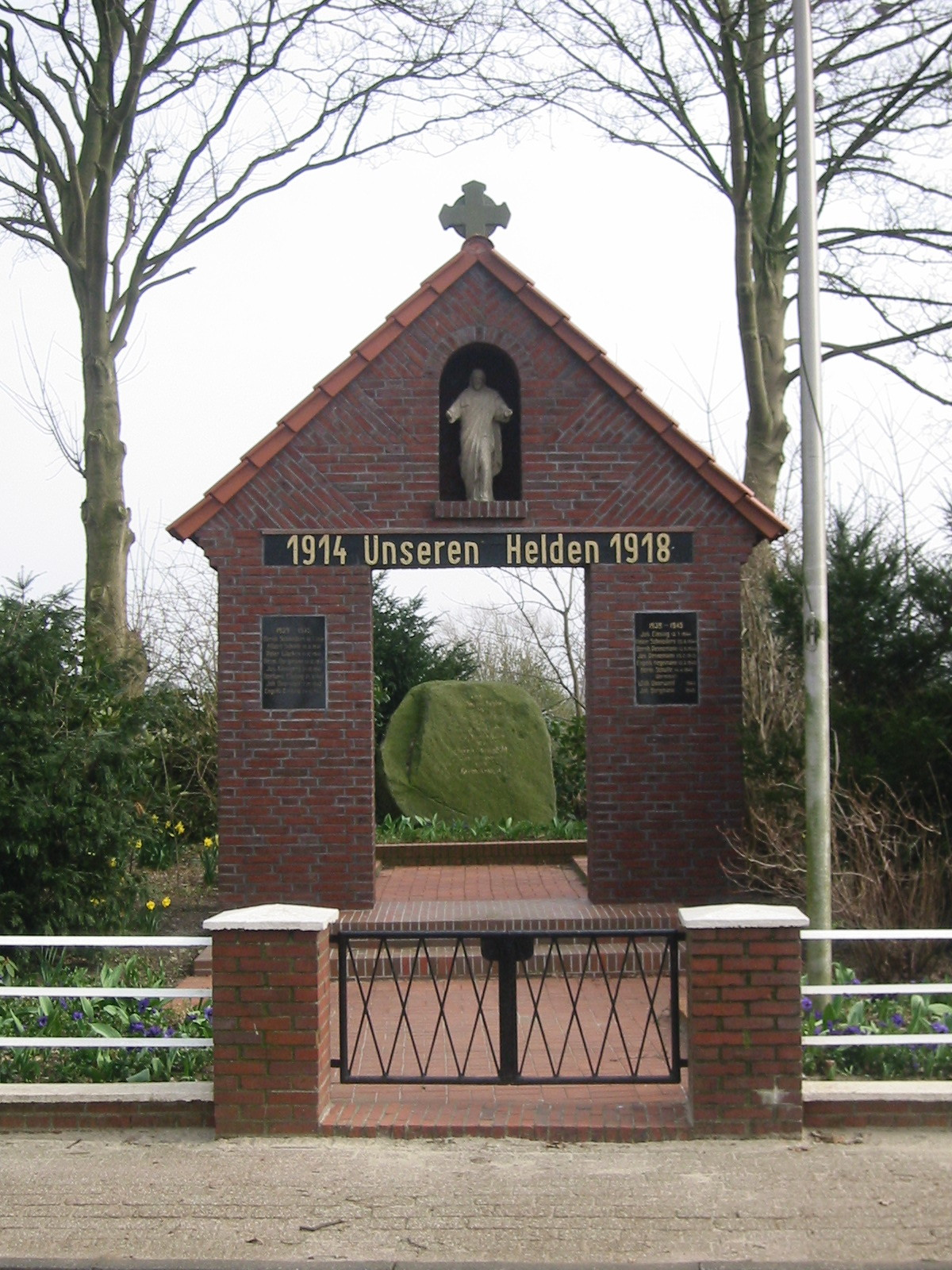
War memorial in Tunxdorf

Tunxdorf is a small village near Papenburg, Lower Saxony, Germany. Along with the neighbouring village of Nenndorf, it constitutes the "Tunxdorf-Nenndorf" district of Papenburg. In 1992, 343 inhabitants overall lived in Tunxdorf and Nenndorf.

== Geographical location ==
Tunxdorf is located between Aschendorf and Papenburg close to the boundary of the Netherlands and southern from Ostfriesland. The river Ems traverses Tunxdorf. In Tunxdorf, the Ems has a nature protection area called "Tunxdorfer Schleife".

== Culture and recreation ==
The lake "Tunxdorfer Waldsee" originated at the dike construction because the Ems has a sandy beach and is used for swimming. Moreover, Tunxdorf has a camping ground. Many other villages in the Emsland Tunxdorf and Nenndorf have their own Schützenfest, which is yearly celebrated on Ascension Day. The hymn of Tunxdorf and Nenndorf is called "Aulkenpott" remembering the "Aulken", a kind of dwarves, which reputedly lived in former times in Tunxdorf according to the sage.
