= Disappearance of Amy Lynn Bradley =

Unsolved 1998 disappearance of a 23-year-old American woman

Amy Lynn Bradley
- Bradley on March 23, 1998, one day before her disappearance
- Born: May 12, 1974; Petersburg, Virginia, U.S.
- Disappeared: March 24, 1998 (aged 23); While on board a Rhapsody of the Seas cruiseliner
- Status: Missing for 28 years, 7 months and 10 days
- Education: Longwood University (BS)
- Occupations: Lifeguard; coach; waitress
- Known for: Missing person
- Height: 5 ft 7 in (170 cm)
- Parents: Ronald Bradley (father); Iva Bradley (mother)
- Relatives: Brad Bradley (brother)
- Distinguishing features: American female. 115–120 pounds. Short, brown hair (though she was known to potentially dye it blonde). Green eyes.

Amy Lynn Bradley (May 12, 1974 – disappeared March 24, 1998) was a 23-year-old American woman who disappeared from the Royal Caribbean cruise ship Rhapsody of the Seas while en route to Curaçao. A graduate of Longwood University, Bradley disappeared without a trace and remains missing. Regarded as one of the most high-profile unsolved missing person cases at sea, Bradley's disappearance has received international attention.

After Bradley had been dancing until the early hours of that morning, the ship's keycard lock system recorded her returning to her cabin at 3:40 a.m. Her father, Ron, awoke around 5:30 a.m. and saw her asleep on a deck chair on the balcony. When she was no longer there at 6:00 a.m., the family alerted ship security and authorities. The Netherlands Antilles Coast Guard conducted a four-day search of the surrounding waters and cruise line routes, but found no evidence. Early theories suggested she may have fallen overboard or died by suicide, though no physical evidence found to date supports either scenario.

In the years since her disappearance, there have been multiple reported sightings of Bradley in Curaçao, Barbados, and San Francisco. While none have been corroborated, they have fueled speculation that she may have been abducted or trafficked. The case has been featured on Dr. Phil, America's Most Wanted, and other investigative programs. In July 2025, Netflix released a three-part documentary series titled Amy Bradley Is Missing, revisiting the circumstances of her disappearance and the unresolved questions in the case.

Her case is still unsolved, as she was declared legally dead in absentia on March 24, 2010. Her legal status was changed despite the fact that no body was ever recovered and no definitive conclusion was reached regarding her fate.

== Background ==
=== Early life and education ===
Amy Lynn Bradley was born on May 12, 1974, in Petersburg, Virginia, to Iva and Ronald "Ron" Bradley, an insurance executive. She has a younger brother, Brad. Bradley was a resident of Chesterfield County, Virginia. She graduated from L. C. Bird High School and attended Longwood University with a full scholarship in basketball, graduating with a degree in sports psychology in December 1996. Bradley was known for her strong swimming abilities as well as having previously worked as a lifeguard.

=== Prior to the disappearance ===
Ron won an all-expenses-paid family cruise from his employer; and Bradley joined her family on the Royal Caribbean International cruise ship Rhapsody of the Seas en route for Curaçao, a Dutch Caribbean island under the Kingdom of the Netherlands. Bradley had a fear of heights and was initially apprehensive about the cruise, due to the size of the ship and being out on the open ocean, but was excited for the trip as Brad had returned home from college and would be joining the family. Bradley had a full-time job at Ruth's Chris Steak House, but had reduced her hours and was planning to start a new job at a computer consulting firm on her return from the cruise.

On March 21, 1998, Bradley and her family boarded the ship. On March 23, Bradley and her brother Brad stayed up late dancing and drinking alcohol with the ship's band, Blue Orchid, at a disco party on the ninth-floor deck. One of the band's members, Alister "Yellow" Douglas, was seen drinking and dancing with Bradley that night but claimed that he left the party at around 1:00 a.m. Videographer Chris Fenwick captured Bradley and Douglas dancing.

After a couple of hours, Brad returned to his family's cabin on the eighth-deck. The ship's computerized keycard lock system recorded that Brad entered the family's cabin at 3:35 a.m.; Amy Bradley followed five minutes later. Brad reported that he and his sister sat on the suite's balcony and talked before he went to sleep. Amy is believed to have stayed awake a while longer.

== Disappearance ==
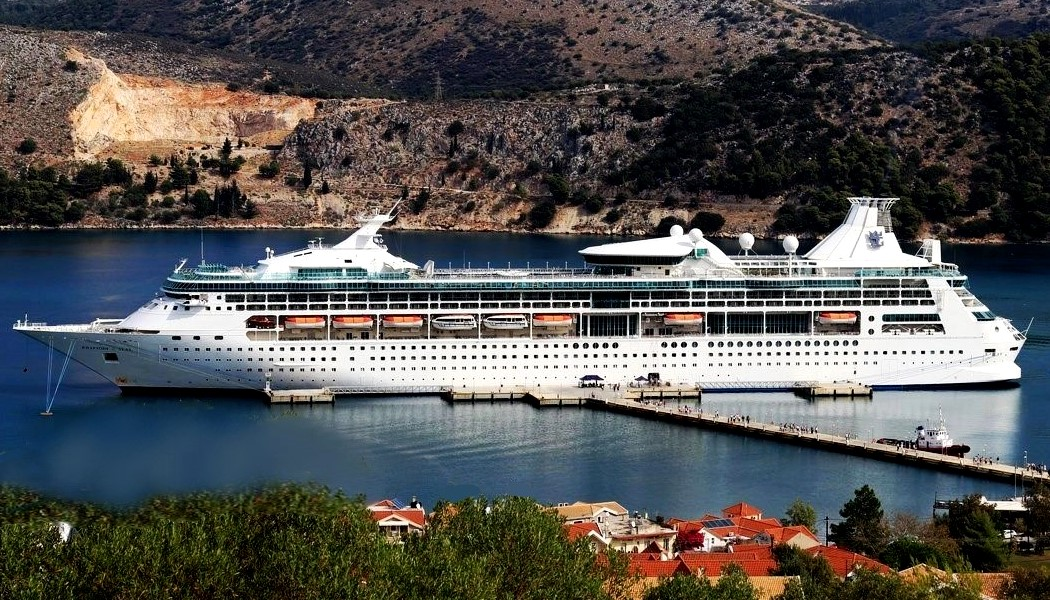
Rhapsody of the Seas, pictured in 2018

Between 5:15 a.m. and 5:30 a.m. on March 24, Ron awoke and checked on his children, seeing that Bradley was asleep on the lounge chair of their cabin's balcony. Ron told local newspapers: "I could see Amy's legs from her hips down. [...] I dozed back off to sleep. The balcony door was closed, because if it hadn't been closed, I would have gotten up and closed it." However, other reports indicated that the balcony door was open at the time. When he got up at 6:00 a.m., however, Bradley was gone, along with her cigarettes and lighter. He later said, "I left to try and go up and find her. When I couldn't find her, I didn't really know what to think, because it was very much unlike Amy to leave and not tell us where she was going." After Ron searched the common areas of the ship, he woke up the rest of the family and told them at 6:30 a.m. that Amy was missing.

On the morning of the disappearance, three witnesses claimed to have seen Bradley on the upper deck with Alister Douglas between 5:30 a.m. and 5:45 a.m. They also testified to seeing Douglas hand Bradley a drink containing dark liquid. They claimed Bradley and Douglas arrived in the elevator at the same time, and that Douglas was then seen leaving the upper deck alone shortly after 6:00 a.m.

=== Search and investigation ===
Bradley's family immediately reported her disappearance to the onboard crew and pleaded with the crew members to keep the 2,000 passengers from disembarking the cruise and to make an announcement to assist in finding Bradley. However, the team at the purser's office informed them that it was too early to make a ship-wide announcement. The crew agreed to issue an announcement at 7:50 a.m., after a majority of the passengers had left the ship, announcing "Will Amy Bradley please come to the purser's desk?" Between 12:15 p.m. and 1:00 p.m., the cruise staff searched through the ship but could not find Bradley. The delay in launching an immediate search has been called a mistake that could have hurt chances of finding Bradley.

Brad recalled that Douglas came up to him shortly after Bradley disappeared and said, "Hey man, I'm sorry to hear about your sister." No announcement had been made by that time and Brad said the timing of the conversation was "suspicious". The FBI interviewed Douglas soon after and gave him a polygraph test, which a Royal Caribbean spokesperson reported that he passed. Ron said that Douglas "came out of the interview smiling, with his thumbs up to his band members, like [...] everything's cool. [...] I knew what was going on. I knew he had been with Amy." Douglas denied knowing anything about Bradley's disappearance.

The Dutch Caribbean Coast Guard conducted a four-day search that ended on March 27. Royal Caribbean Cruise Lines chartered a boat to continue looking for her. The Coast Guard used three helicopters and a radar plane to assist in the search.

Initially, the authorities suspected that Bradley had either fallen overboard or died by suicide. However, investigators said that there is "no evidence that Amy, a trained lifeguard, fell overboard, was pushed or committed suicide."

=== Possible sightings ===
One month after Bradley's disappearance, her family traveled to Curaçao and were approached by a cab driver who claimed to have seen Bradley while the ship was docking on March 24. He said Bradley was running through the parking lot in search of a phone. He stated he remembered her green eyes which were described in the reward poster. The witness also claimed to have seen Bradley in other locations on the island. The cab driver's claims were never corroborated by authorities.

In August 1998, two Canadian scuba divers claimed to have seen a woman they believed to be Bradley on a popular Curaçao diving beach known as Playa Porto Marie. Witness David Carmichael claimed that a woman matching Bradley's description was in the presence of two "aggressive men", one reportedly fitting Douglas' description. The witness yelled out to a friend, asking if he had a piece of his dive gear. The woman believed to be Bradley, upon hearing the man speak English, reportedly spun around and came back towards him. The witness then claimed that the man resembling Douglas came into his field of vision and motioned the woman away to the beach's bar. Carmichael claims the woman would occasionally look at him and then look down, appearing to try to subtly communicate with him. The witnesses were 2 feet (0.61 m) away from the woman and accurately described Bradley's eyes and tattoos. Carmichael recognized Bradley after seeing her photo on America's Most Wanted and stated: "I am haunted by that encounter with Amy. I know it was her." He later phoned Bradley's father and flew to Virginia to meet the Bradley family. The FBI investigated the reported sighting but were unable to corroborate the claims.

U.S. Navy Petty Officer, William Hefner, claimed to have encountered a woman claiming to be Amy Bradley at a brothel in Curaçao in January 1999. Hefner described being seated in the bar area when a Caucasian woman approached him, identifying herself as Amy Bradley and pleading for assistance. According to Hefner, she told him she was being held against her will. Hefner said the woman explained her situation, telling him that she had been on a cruise, had disembarked to seek drugs, and was now trapped in the establishment. After retiring from the Navy, Hefner reached out to Bradley's family in May 2002, explaining that he initially refrained from reporting the incident due to concerns for his military career related to his presence in a brothel. He expressed conviction that the woman he encountered was indeed Amy Bradley. The FBI subsequently investigated these claims; however, they discovered that the brothel had burned down and no substantive evidence was found to support Hefner's assertions.

== Later developments ==
In the fall of 1999, Bradley's parents received an email from a man named Frank Jones. Jones told the family that he was a former U.S. Army Special Forces officer with a team of experienced soldiers who might be able to rescue Bradley. Jones had claimed that his team had seen Bradley being held by heavily armed Colombian personnel in a housing complex surrounded by barbed wire. The team also gave an accurate description of Bradley's tattoos and sang the lullaby that Bradley's mother used to sing to her. Over the next few months, Jones would feed news to the family and provided reports on sightings of their daughter. When Jones told them they were going to attempt a rescue, he added that more funds were needed. The Bradleys sent Jones a total of $210,000 to fund the set up for the search and had expected a call from Jones and his team for the results of the rescue mission that never came. Jones had made the story up and had tried to scam the Bradleys of money. In February 2002, federal prosecutors in Richmond charged him with defrauding the Bradleys of $24,444 and the National Missing Children's Organization of $186,416. Jones pleaded guilty in April of mail fraud and was sentenced to five years in prison.

In April 2003, witnesses reported seeing a woman matching Bradley's description in San Francisco, California, watching a street musician in the company of two men. The witnesses asserted they immediately recognized the woman as Bradley. Upon realizing they had been identified, the two men reportedly seized her and fled the scene. The woman allegedly cast a "pleading" look to the witnesses as she was being taken away. FBI sketches were released of the men who were believed to be with Bradley at the time.

In March 2005, a witness named Judy Maurer claimed to have seen Bradley in a department store restroom in Bridgetown, Barbados. Maurer said she was using the restroom when a woman entered accompanied by four men who were discussing what sounded like an illegal "deal." Maurer said the woman at one point asked the men if they could "stop and see the children." It is unknown what children were being referenced. Maurer claims at that point the men left the restroom and she exited the stall and spoke to the woman. She said she believed the woman said she was from West Virginia, and softly said her name was Amy. Maurer called authorities and they created composite sketches of men and the woman based on her account.

Bradley's parents appeared on the November 17, 2005, episode of Dr. Phil. During that episode, an image of a scantily clad woman resembling Bradley that had been emailed to her parents was shown on the program, suggesting that she could have been trafficked into sexual slavery. Two photographs were discovered online by a member of an organization that attempts to track victims on sites that feature sex workers. The woman in the photo has been said to appear "distraught and despondent" and was a sex worker known as "Jas". The authenticity of the photographs could not be determined by the FBI; special agent Erin Sheridan stated: "We did follow that lead. The difficult part is back then information such as that or pictures such as that, you cannot tell when they're altered." A man who later worked with the FBI performed facial comparisons and his opinion was that the photographs were of Bradley.

On November 12, 2010, a human jawbone was discovered on a beach in Aruba. Initially, it was thought to be the jawbone of another missing person, Natalee Holloway, but testing determined that it did not belong to her. No DNA or other testing was done that could have established a connection to Bradley, although the remains were said to be likely from a Caucasian woman.

Bradley was declared legally dead on March 24, 2010, twelve years after the disappearance with no witnesses and no body found.

== Theories and speculation ==
There are several theories regarding what could have happened to Bradley.

One of the most popular theories was that she was kidnapped and sold into the illegal human trafficking industry in the Caribbean. This was based on the account of Hefner and the photo that was emailed to Bradley's family in 2005. This theory also includes suspicions of the ship's band members on the night of Bradley's disappearance and conflicts between the story that bass player Douglas gave to authorities compared to what was seen on CCTV footage.

Claims have also been made that a waiter on the ship could have been involved in Bradley's disappearance. Throughout the night, Bradley's family was approached by the waiter asking to pass on a note to Bradley for him involving an invitation for her to go drinking with him once they reached shore. In addition, the professional photographer had printed out all photos taken throughout the cruise to sell at a stall, but the family could not find any of Bradley's photos; this made the family believe that the photos had been removed by somebody.

Another theory authorities considered was that Bradley was murdered on the ship and thrown overboard. However, the only evidence supporting this is the discovery of a jawbone which washed ashore on a beach in Aruba. Bradley falling overboard or committing suicide is another theory, as initially suggested by the authorities.

On November 16, 1998, FBI special agent James Weber stated: "We've pursued every angle, from whether there was foul play, a suicide or an accident, and we have basically not gotten anywhere."

== Aftermath and rewards ==
Amy Lynn Bradley Missing Person Poster. FBI

The FBI is currently offering a reward of up to $25,000 for any information that could potentially lead to finding Bradley or leading to the arrest and conviction of person(s) responsible for her disappearance. The family has offered a $250,000 reward for information leading to her safe return and a reward of $50,000 for information leading to her current location.

Bradley's case was featured on Unsolved Mysteries, America's Most Wanted, and the television show Disappeared. Her case was also the subject of episode 59 of the Casefile podcast, episode 647 of Generation Why (podcast), and the podcast Crime Junkie and The Casual Criminalist. On July 16, 2025, a three-part documentary series titled Amy Bradley Is Missing was released on Netflix. The Netflix series was nominated for the 2026 GLAAD Media Award for Outstanding Documentary.

Renewed attention was paid to her case after the disappearance of Natalee Holloway in 2005.

On July 27, 2025, podcast host Ethan Klein announced on the H3 Podcast that he would offer a $1,000,000 reward for any information or actions leading to Bradley being safely returned home.

== See also ==
- Disappearance of George Smith – Unsolved 2005 disappearance
- Disappearance of Natalee Holloway – 2005 disappearance of an American in Aruba
- Disappearance of Rebecca Coriam – 2011 disappearance from cruise ship
- Disappearance of Sarm Heslop – 2021 disappearance in the U.S. Virgin Islands
- List of people who disappeared mysteriously at sea
