= Brilliance of the Seas =

Cruise ship built in 2002

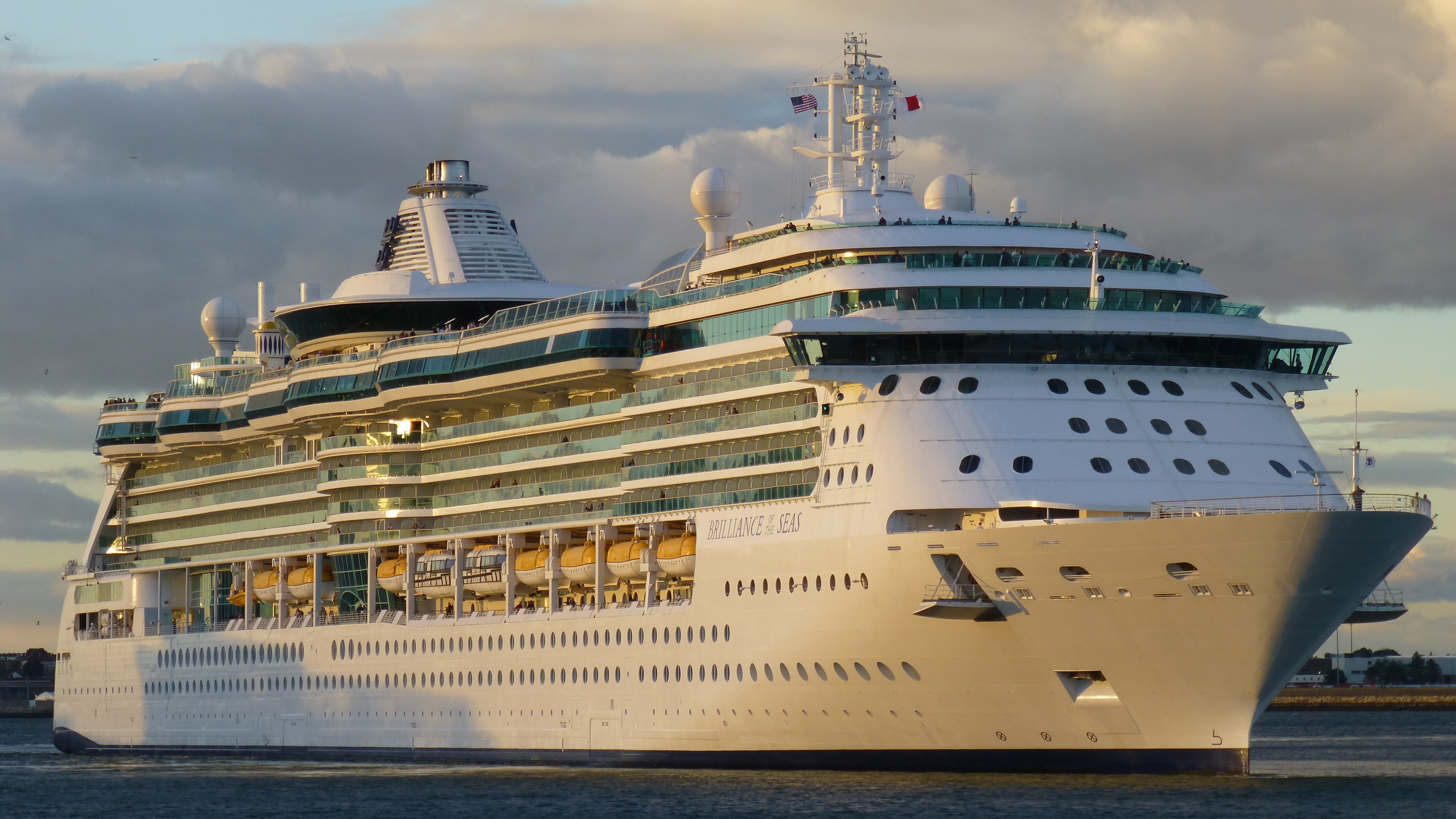
- Brilliance of the Seas docked in Boston

History

Bahamas
- Name: Brilliance of the Seas
- Owner: Royal Caribbean Group
- Operator: Royal Caribbean International
- Port of registry: Nassau, Bahamas
- Ordered: 9 April 1998
- Builder: Meyer Werft, (Papenburg, Germany)
- Cost: US $350 million
- Yard number: 656
- Laid down: 25 June 1998
- Launched: 1 December 2001
- Christened: 13 July 2002 by Marilyn Ofer in Harwich, England
- Acquired: 5 July 2002
- Maiden voyage: 19 July 2002
- In service: 2002–present
- Identification: Call sign: C6SJ5; DNV ID: 21563; IMO number: 9195200; MMSI number: 311361000
- Status: Cruising

General characteristics
- Class & type: Radiance-class cruise ship
- Tonnage: 90,090 GT; 53,812 NT; 10,759 DWT
- Length: 292 m (958 ft 0 in)
- Beam: 39.8 m (130 ft 7 in)
- Draft: 8.5 m (27 ft 11 in)
- Depth: 11.5 m (37 ft 9 in)
- Decks: 12 decks
- Installed power: Two General Electric LM2500+ gas turbines (20.5 MW each)
- Propulsion: Diesel-electric; Two ABB Azipods (2 × 19.5 MW); Three bow thrusters
- Speed: 25 knots (46 km/h; 29 mph)
- Capacity: 2,140 passengers (double occupancy); 2,543 passengers (maximum)
- Crew: 848

Brilliance of the Seas is a Radiance class cruise ship operated by Royal Caribbean International. Completed in 2002, she has a maximum capacity of 2,543 passengers and carries 848 crew.

== History ==
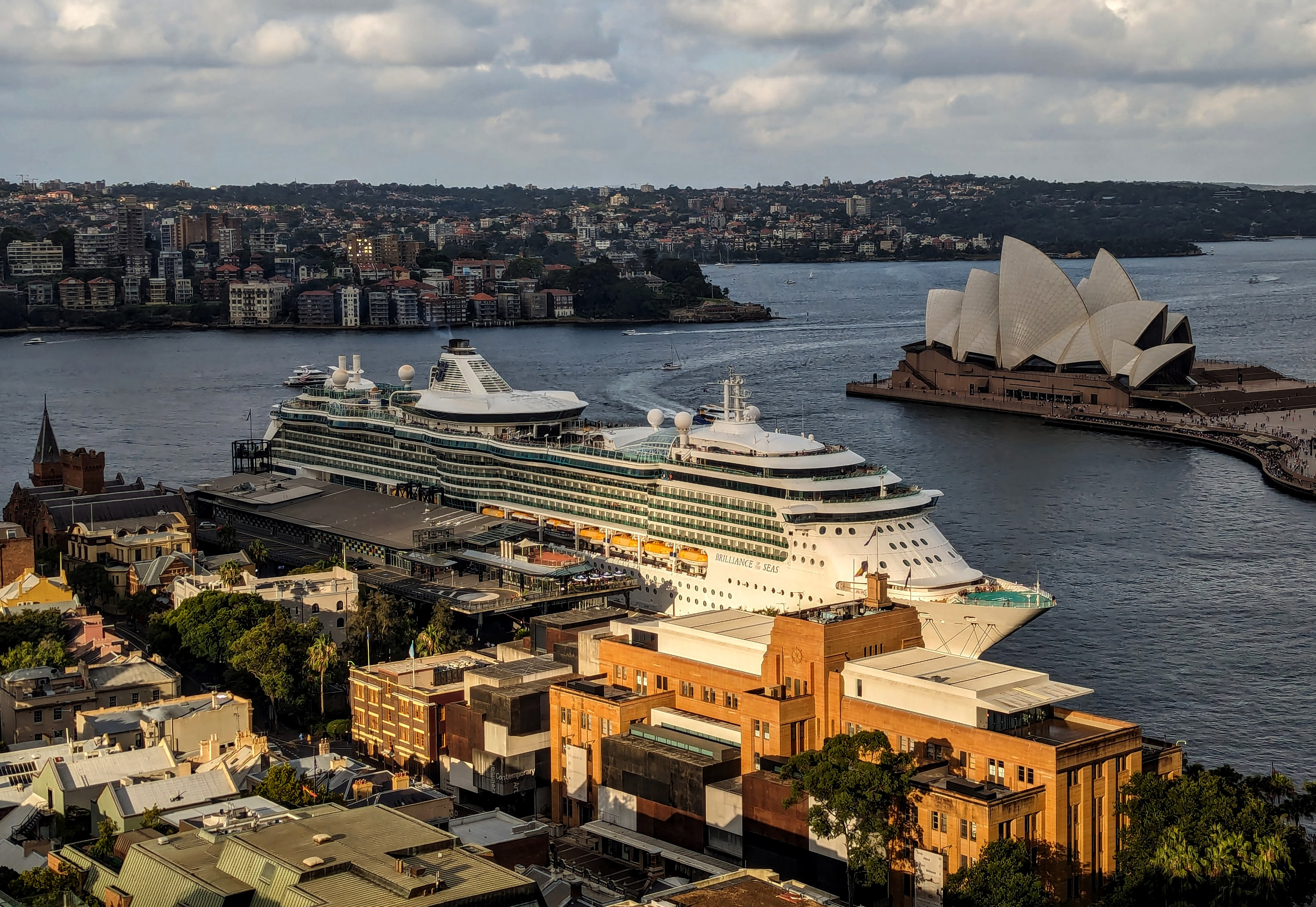
In a sunbeam at The Rocks, Sydney

The ship was ordered by Royal Caribbean International on April 9, 1998, and was subsequently laid down on June 25, 1998. The ship was launched by Meyer Werft shipyard in Papenburg, Germany on December 1, 2001, and delivered to Royal Caribbean on July 5, 2002.

Like other Radiance class ships, Brilliance is outfitted with gas turbine engines, rather than traditional diesel engines. Gas turbines produce less emissions and thus are more environmentally friendly

Brilliance of the Seas was christened by Marilyn Ofer on July 13, 2002, and set sail on her maiden voyage on July 19, a 7-night Norwegian Fjords cruise.

=== 2024 propulsion issues ===
On March 21, 2024, during a South Pacific Islands cruise that began on March 19, 2024, a mechanical issue developed with the propulsion system of the Brilliance of the Seas, and the cruise was cancelled on March 22, 2024. Guests received a 50% cruise credit. The planned subsequent cruise to Tasmania was also cancelled to accommodate the required maintenance. Guests scheduled for the subsequent cruise received a full refund and a 50% cruise credit, as well as limited reimbursement for travel fees incurred.

== Current Operations ==
Brilliance of the Seas undertakes Southern Caribbean cruises out of San Juan, Puerto Rico, during the winter season and cruises from Piraeus (Athens) to the Greek Isles in the summer.

== Accidents and incidents ==
On her sea trials in June 2002, a net got tangled in the ship's propeller and had to be removed by divers.

=== Heeling incident ===
On December 11, 2010, Brilliance of the Seas left Rhodes, Greece on a cruise around the eastern Mediterranean, and experienced very high seas and 80 mph (130 km/h) wind gusts. At around 2:15 AM, it was reported that in a cluster of ships rushing to enter the port of Alexandria, a freighter turned in front of Brilliance of the Seas, forcing the ship's captain, Erik Tengelsen, to slow below the 9 knots (17 km/h; 10 mph) necessary to maintain her stabilisers' function. The ship started to heel to port and starboard violently. Passengers reported that they were thrown out of beds; furniture and unsecured objects tossed and slid about their staterooms. Two grand pianos broke free and were destroyed during the incident. Windows and mirrors were smashed, and the spa basins were damaged. A reported 138 passengers needed medical treatment for their injuries, the most serious of which were two guests that sustained broken bones. The heeling incident lasted several minutes, after which the captain acknowledged that it had been a "horrifying experience." Captain Tengelsen reported to news outlets that he was taken by surprise at the force of the storm when, he said, weather reports leaving Rhodes only forecast winds at 45 knots (83 km/h; 52 mph) with gusts of 50–60 knots (93–111 km/h; 58–69 mph). The next morning, Royal Caribbean International announced through its crew that a $200 per-stateroom refund would be given. Following a brief, but vocal outrage by passengers, Royal announced that on top of the $200, passengers could also expect a full refund of each passenger's stateroom fare. A lawsuit brought by the husband of Barbara Davey, a Scottish woman who fell into a coma three days afterwards and later died, claimed that her death had been caused by head injuries sustained during the incident.

=== Disappearance of George Allen Smith ===
George Allen Smith disappeared on July 5, 2005, when the Brilliance of the Seas was between Greece and Turkey. He was a passenger on his honeymoon. Blood was found inside and outside his room. His family accuses Royal Caribbean of failing to adequately handle the case. The case led to an FBI investigation and a congressional inquiry in the United States.

=== 2025 Refugee Rescue ===
On February 26, 2025, the Brilliance of the Seas rescued 11 refugees from a vessel in distress in the Gulf of Mexico. Among the passengers who watched the rescue was former MTV host Julie Brown, who was performing on the ship. She was recorded on video witnessing and commenting on the rescue, noting that people were ferried three at the time from the failing boat and that the ones remaining were brought life jackets.
