= Disappearance of George Smith =

Unsolved 2005 disappearance

George Smith
- Born: October 3, 1978
- Disappeared: July 5, 2005 (aged 26) somewhere off the coast of Turkey
- Status: Missing for 21 years, 1 month and 11 days (presumed dead, July 2005)
- Occupation: Store manager
- Known for: Disappearing from a cruise ship on his honeymoon
- Spouse: Jennifer Hagel (m. 2005)

George Allen Smith IV (born October 3, 1978) was an American man who disappeared overboard from the Royal Caribbean International cruise ship MS Brilliance of the Seas in July 2005 under suspicious circumstances. His story has been reported on by Dateline NBC and 48 Hours. The case has also been depicted in a television film called Deadly Honeymoon, which still airs on Lifetime.

== Background ==
Having married Jennifer Hagel eleven days earlier, George Smith was on his honeymoon. Their honeymoon was a two-week trip on a Mediterranean cruise stopping in Greece, Turkey, and Italy, among other locations.

== Disappearance ==
Smith mysteriously disappeared in the early morning hours of July 5, 2005, and evidence suggested that foul play might have been involved. Blood stains were found in his cabin as well as on the side of the ship, and it appeared that he might have been thrown off the ship or fallen overboard and drowned. The police suspected homicide.

On July 29, 2005, the United States Federal Bureau of Investigation (FBI) announced that they were investigating Smith's disappearance. Geraldo Rivera aired a news story interviewing Josh Askin, one of the people last seen with Smith, along with two men of Russian origin; Greg and Zach Rozenberg. On June 29, 2006, it was announced that Royal Caribbean International had agreed to pay compensation to Smith's estate.

Investigation of the disappearance continued in 2012. The New York Post reported that the matter had been referred to the Mafia division of the FBI. The television program Dateline shed new light on the theory that the death was most likely a robbery gone bad. Jennifer Hagel Smith, who remarried in 2009, and was criticized in certain quarters (particularly by Smith's family) for her conduct on the night of his disappearance, has contended that she believes it was an accident caused by her late husband's intoxication. In June 2006, Hagel Smith accepted compensation set at $1.1 million from Royal Caribbean. However, Smith's family later challenged the terms of the settlement as well as the amount of the monetary compensation.

== Cruise ship passenger rights ==
Smith's disappearance has led to wider interest in passenger rights on cruise ships. In 2013, the Cruise Lines International Association (CLIA) introduced a bill of rights that CEO and President Christine Duffy said "codifies many long-standing practices of CLIA members and goes beyond those to further inform cruise guests of the industry's commitment to their comfort and care." In the same year, Smith's parents backed a bill co-sponsored by U.S. Senators Richard Blumenthal and Jay Rockefeller, The Cruise Ship Passenger Protection Act. The bill would allow for greater transparency when crimes are committed on cruise ships and more federal government protection of passengers' rights.

== See also ==
- Disappearance of Amy Lynn Bradley – Unsolved 1998 disappearance of a 23-year-old American woman
- Disappearance of Rebecca Coriam – 2011 disappearance from cruise ship
- List of people who disappeared mysteriously at sea
