= Jewel of the Seas =

Cruise ship

History

Bahamas
- Name: Jewel of the Seas
- Owner: Jewel of the Seas Inc.
- Operator: Royal Caribbean International
- Port of registry: Nassau, Bahamas
- Builder: Meyer Werft
- Laid down: 9 November 2002
- Launched: 13 March 2004
- Maiden voyage: 8 May 2004
- In service: 2004–present
- Identification: Call sign C6FW9; IMO number: 9228356; MMSI number: 311583000
- Status: in service

General characteristics
- Class & type: Radiance-class cruise ship
- Tonnage: 90,090 GT
- Length: 962 ft (293 m)
- Beam: 105.6 ft (32.2 m)
- Height: 63 m (206 ft 8 in)
- Draft: 26.7 ft (8.1 m)
- Decks: 12 passenger decks (deck 2-13)
- Propulsion: 2 × ABB azipods, 3 x bow thrusters
- Speed: 25 knots (46 km/h; 29 mph)
- Capacity: 2,501 passengers
- Crew: 842
- Notes: 3,343 total passenger/crew

GTS Jewel of the Seas is a Radiance-class cruise ship operated by Royal Caribbean. The ship was completed in the spring of 2004 with her maiden voyage in May of that year.

== History ==
The ship was built at Meyer Werft, Papenburg, Germany. After her float out, she left the shipyard on 4 April 2004. The ship was delivered to RCI on 22 April 2004.

Jewel of the Seas initially operated cruises from Rome (Civitavecchia), Italy, to the Greek Isles in the Mediterranean Sea until November 2016, the ship re-positioned to cruising from San Juan, Puerto Rico to Caribbean destinations. In March 2019 the ship re-positioned from the Caribbean to the Mediterranean where it operated cruises in the Greek Isles and as of December 2019 it has been home ported in Dubai and operated cruises within the Persian Gulf.

In April 2016, Jewel of the Seas completed a £20 million renovation. In May 2024, Jewel of the Seas completed a three-week renovation in dry dock at Damen Shiprepair in Brest, France.

=== Coronavirus pandemic ===
On 11 March 2020, the ship was docked at the Dubai Cruise Terminal with two passengers that were experiencing respiratory illnesses. (Note: Both passengers were diagnosed with symptoms unrelated to the coronavirus.) After the ship was placed in quarantine, test results for the two sick passengers returned negative, and the ship was given the all clear. (Note: Business Insider reported that the two passengers had tested positive, while inexplicably linking to an article that said they had tested negative.) However, because many ports had begun to close, Jewel of the Seas ended up staying at Dubai for the duration of the cruise, and Royal Caribbean gave the passengers full refunds and allowed them to use the ship as a hotel.

In May 2020 while moored outside Piraeus, a 27 year old crewmember went overboard and died. The crewmember, who worked as an electrician, reportedly was not missed for over 48 hours, before crew of the Jewel of the Seas began searching for him.

Up until late April 2021 Jewel of the Seas was at anchor in Poole Bay off the Dorset coast in the UK sitting out the COVID-19 pandemic. As with the other cruise ships in the area the ship made occasional visits to The Port of Southampton to collect supplies and fuel. The ship has since returned to service in the Caribbean.
