= Papenburg =

- Town
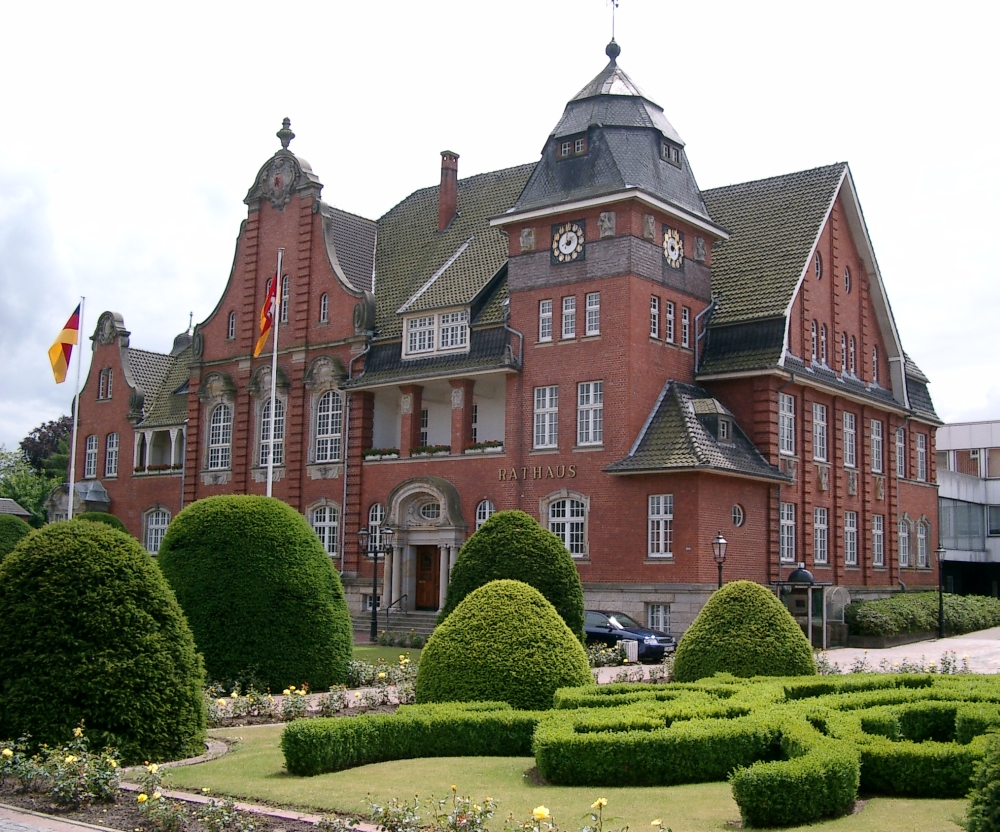
- City hall in 2004

- Flag Coat of arms

- Location of Papenburg within Emsland district
- Interactive map of Papenburg
- Location within Germany Location within Lower Saxony
- Coordinates: 53°04′N 07°24′E
- Country: Germany
- State: Lower Saxony
- District: Emsland
- Subdivisions: 6 subdivisions

Government
  - Mayor (2021–26): Vanessa Gattung (SPD)

Area
  - Total: 118.44 km^{2} (45.73 sq mi)
- Elevation: 6 m (20 ft)

Population (2025-12-31)
  - Total: 36,972
  - Density: 312.16/km^{2} (808.49/sq mi)
- Time zone: UTC+01:00 (CET)
  - Summer (DST): UTC+02:00 (CEST)
- Postal codes: 26871
- Dialling codes: 04961, 04962, 04965
- Vehicle registration: EL
- Website: www.papenburg.de

Papenburg (German pronunciation: [ˈpaːpm̩bʊʁk]; East Frisian Low Saxon: Papenbörg) is a city in the district of Emsland, Lower Saxony, Germany, situated at the river Ems. It is known for its large shipyard, the Meyer-Werft, which specializes in building cruise liners.

== Geography ==
=== Districts ===
Papenburg is subdivided into 6 urban districts, Papenburg-Untenende, Papenburg-Obenende, Herbrum, Tunxdorf-Nenndorf, Aschendorf and Bokel.

== History ==
In the Chronicle of the Frisians, written in the 16th century by the East-Frisian council Eggerik Benninga, the Papenburg (at that time a manor) is mentioned for the first time. In 1458, Hayo von Haren, called "von der Papenburch", confessed to be leaned with the Papenburg. The contract that was made because of this is the earliest verifiably documented mention of Papenburg.

On 2 December 1630, the district administrator Dietrich von Velen purchased the manor for 1500 Reichsthaler from Friedrich von Schwarzenberg in order to found a settlement in the fen-surrounded region.

On 4 April 1631, Bishop Ferdinand von Münster leased the then castle and manor Papenburg to Dietrich von Velen. This is considered to be the foundation of the city of Papenburg.

Matthias von Velen and his wife Margartha Anna, born von Galen, endowed the oldest church in Papenburg on 7 December 1680, dedicated to Anthony of Padua, making him its patron saint.

From 1933 to 1945 a series of 15 moorland labor, punitive and POWs-camps were active in the districts of Emsland and Bentheim. The central administration was set in Papenburg where now a memorial of these camps, the Dokumentations- und Informationszentrum (DIZ) Emslandlager, is located.

== Population ==
(always according to 31 December)

- 1998 - 33,671
- 1999 - 33,731
- 2000 - 34,096
- 2001 - 34,266
- 2002 - 34,403
- 2003 - 34,245
- 2004 - 34,440
- 2005 - 34,905
- 2006 - 34,797
- 2007 - 35,431
- 2012 - 37,532
- 2021 - 38.573

== Transport ==
There is no airport in the city. The nearest airport is Bremen Airport, located 111 km (69 mi) east of Papenburg. This area is known for track testing, called the Automotive Testing Papenburg (ATP). It has two railway stations, both on the Rheine–Norddeich Mole railway line: Papenburg and Aschendorf.

== Twin towns – sister cities ==
Papenburg is twinned with:

- Pogranichny, Russia
- Rochefort, France

== Gallery ==
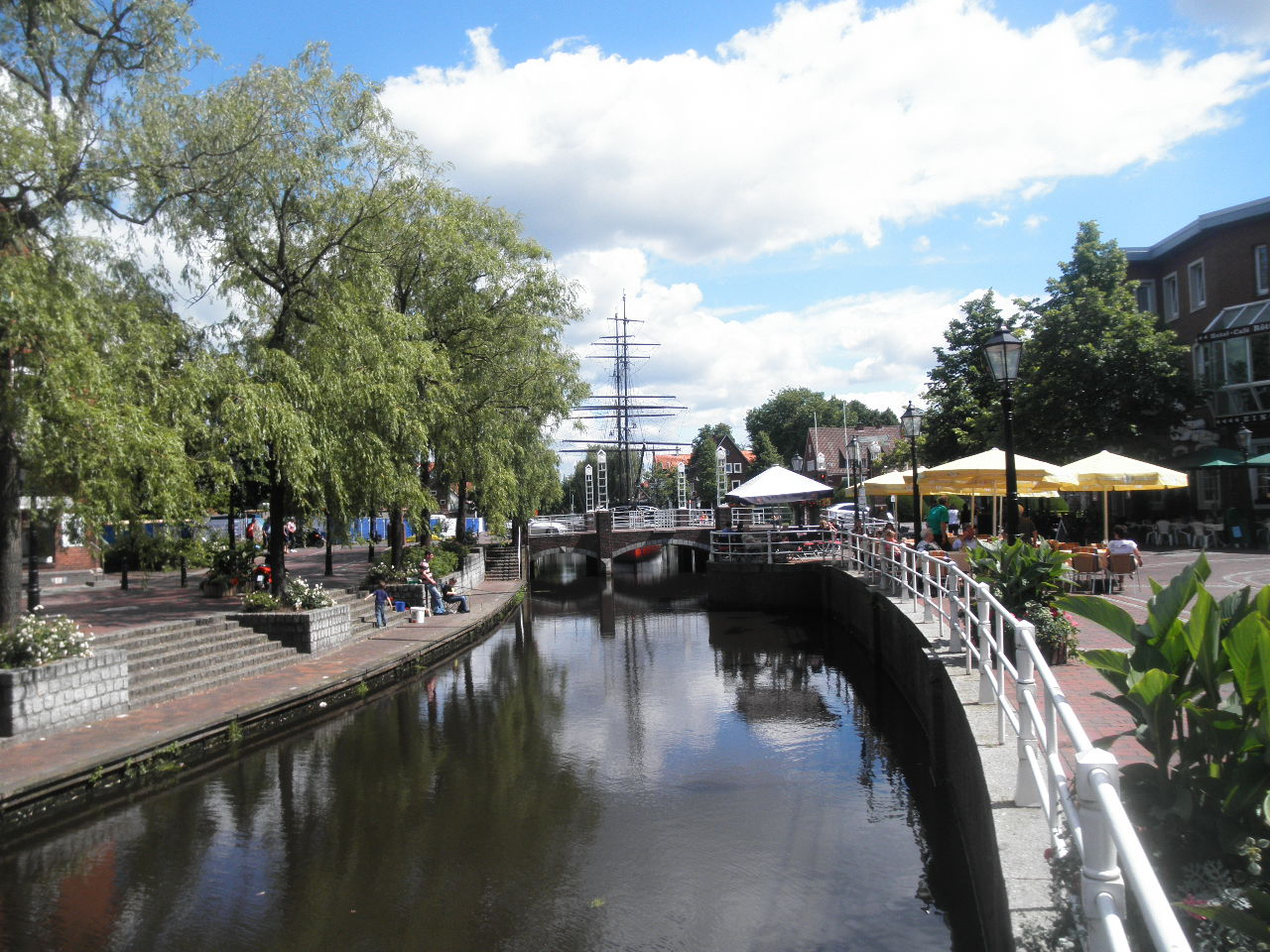
Papenburg Hauptkanal

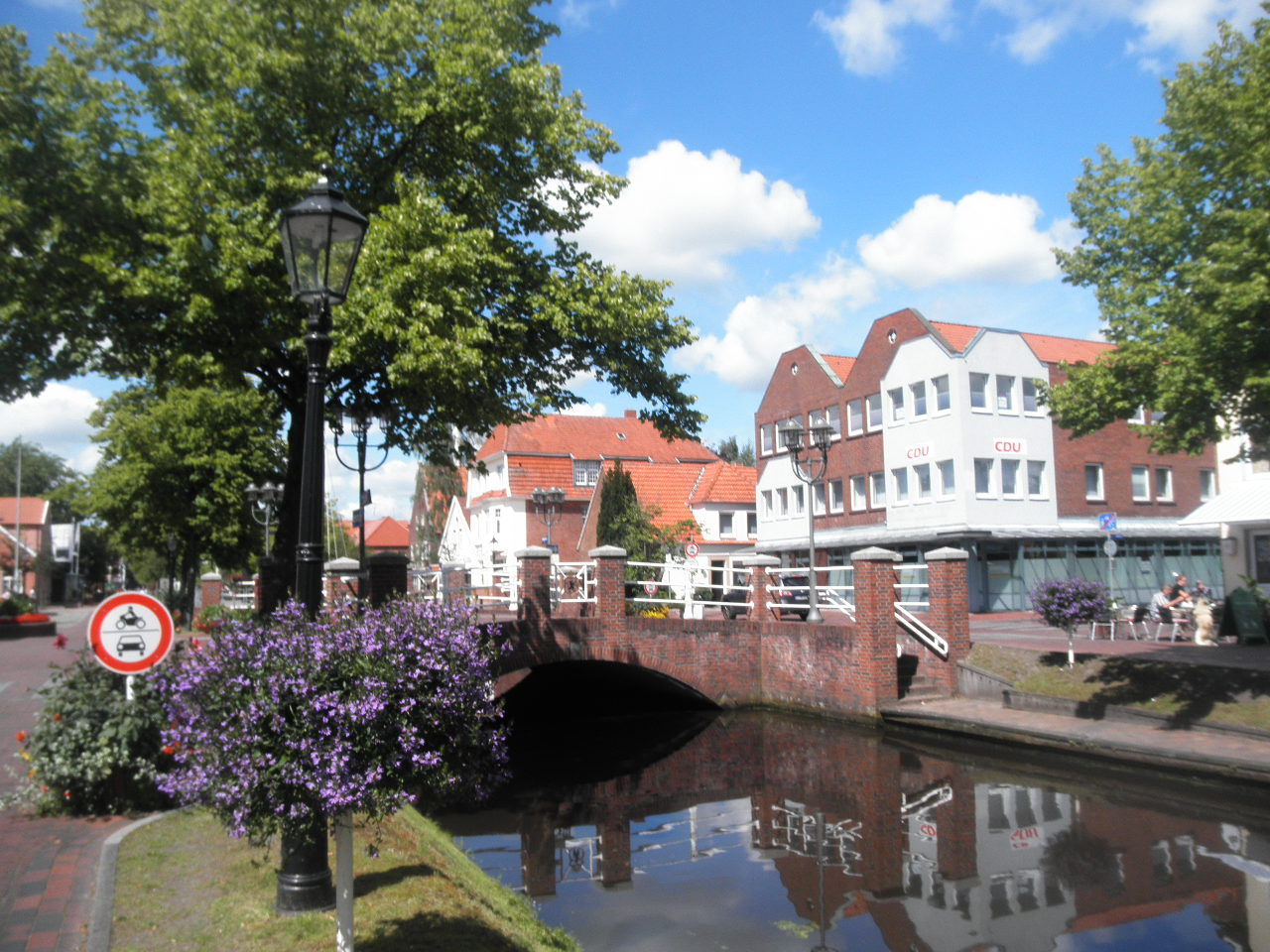
Bridge on Hauptkanal

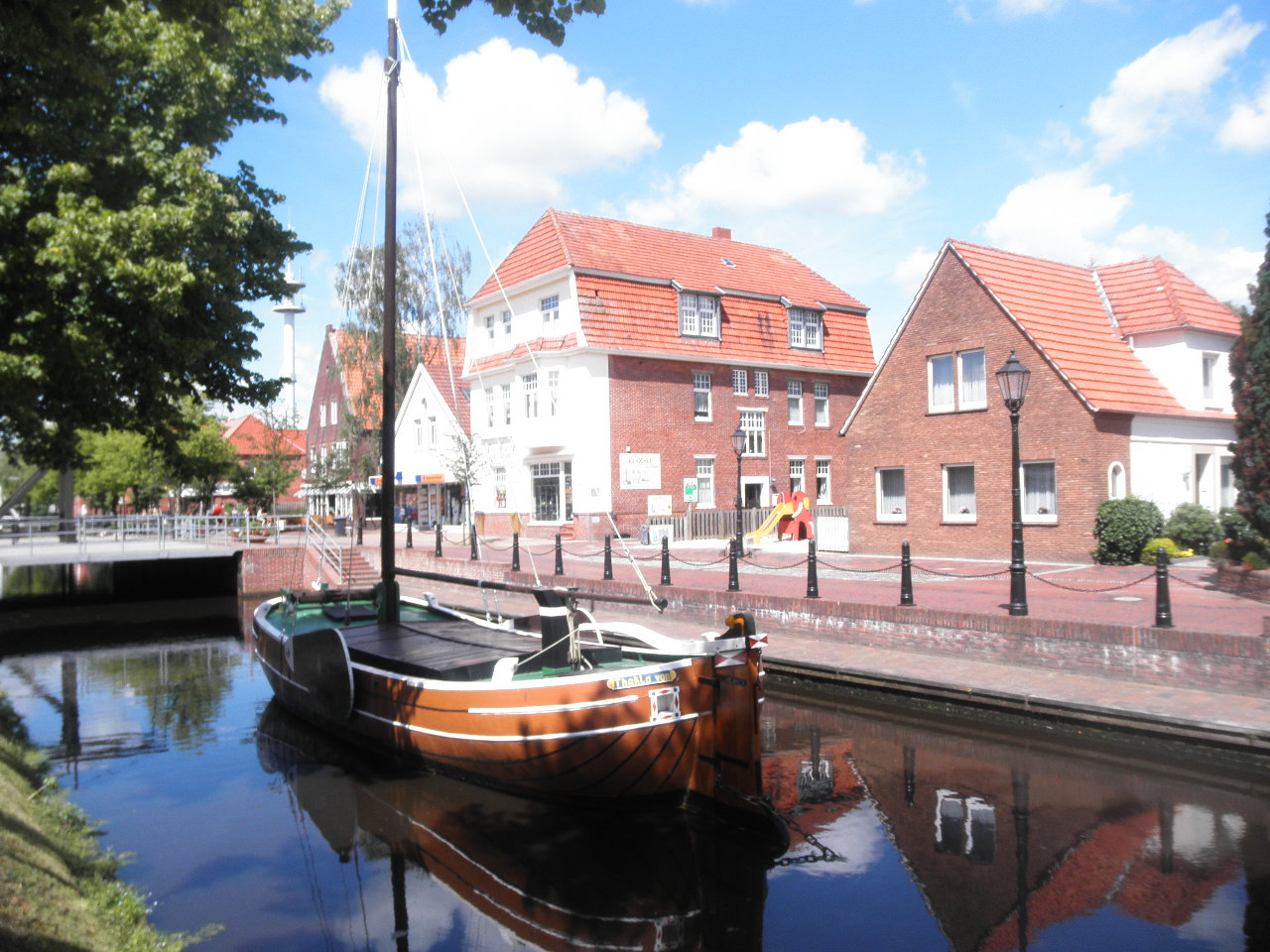
Boat on Hauptkanal

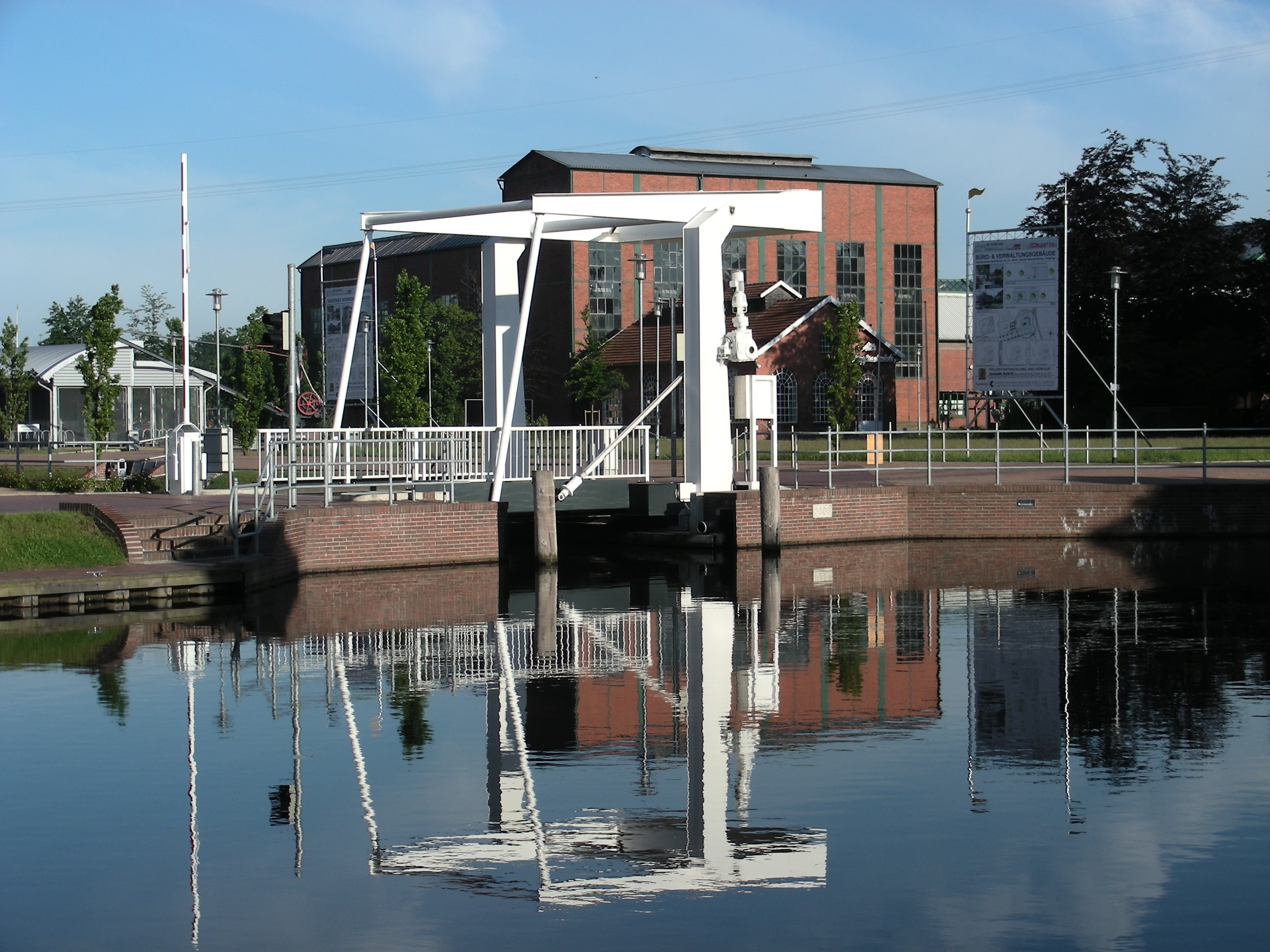
Waterlock

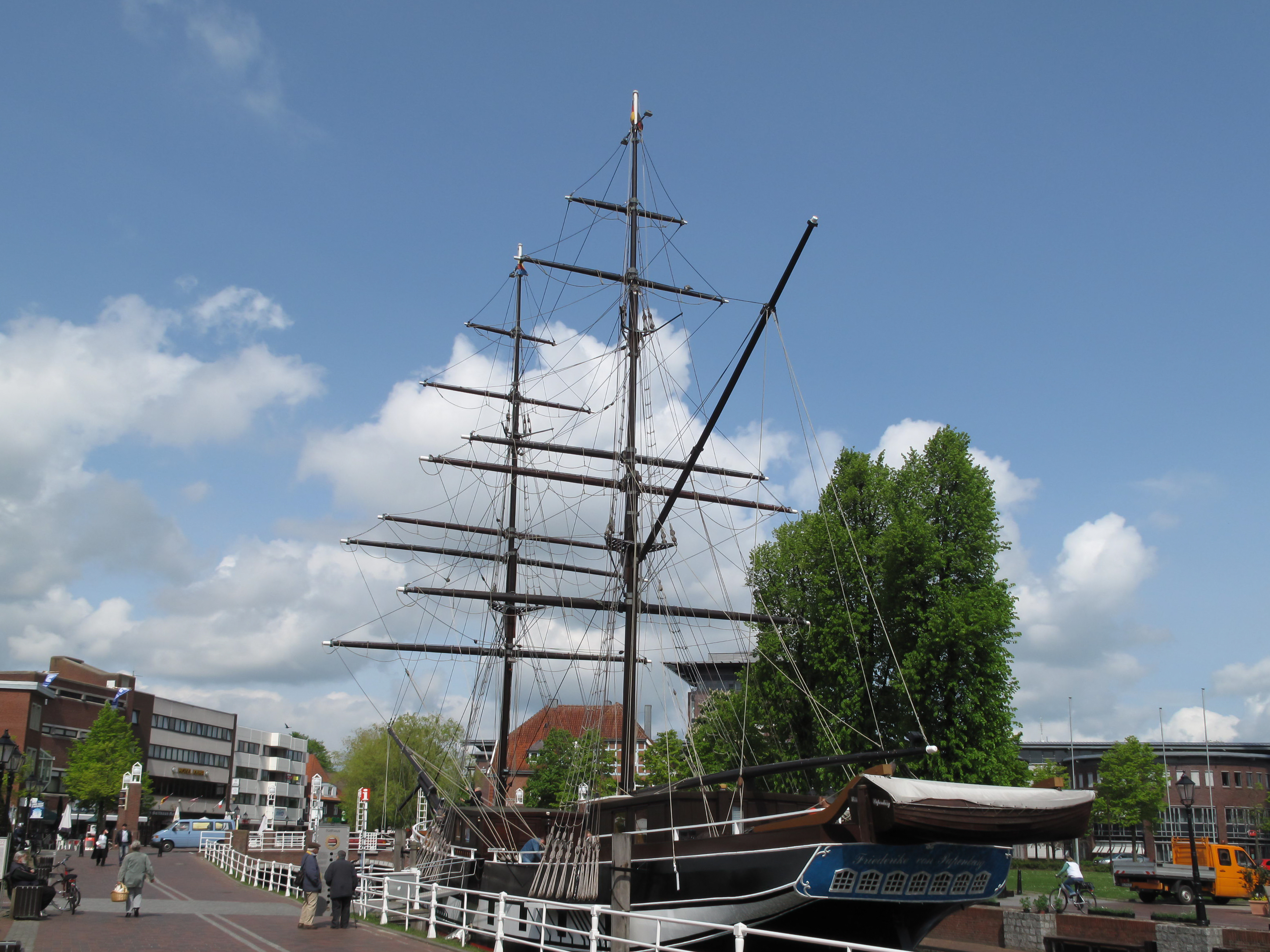
Ship Die Friederike von Papenburg

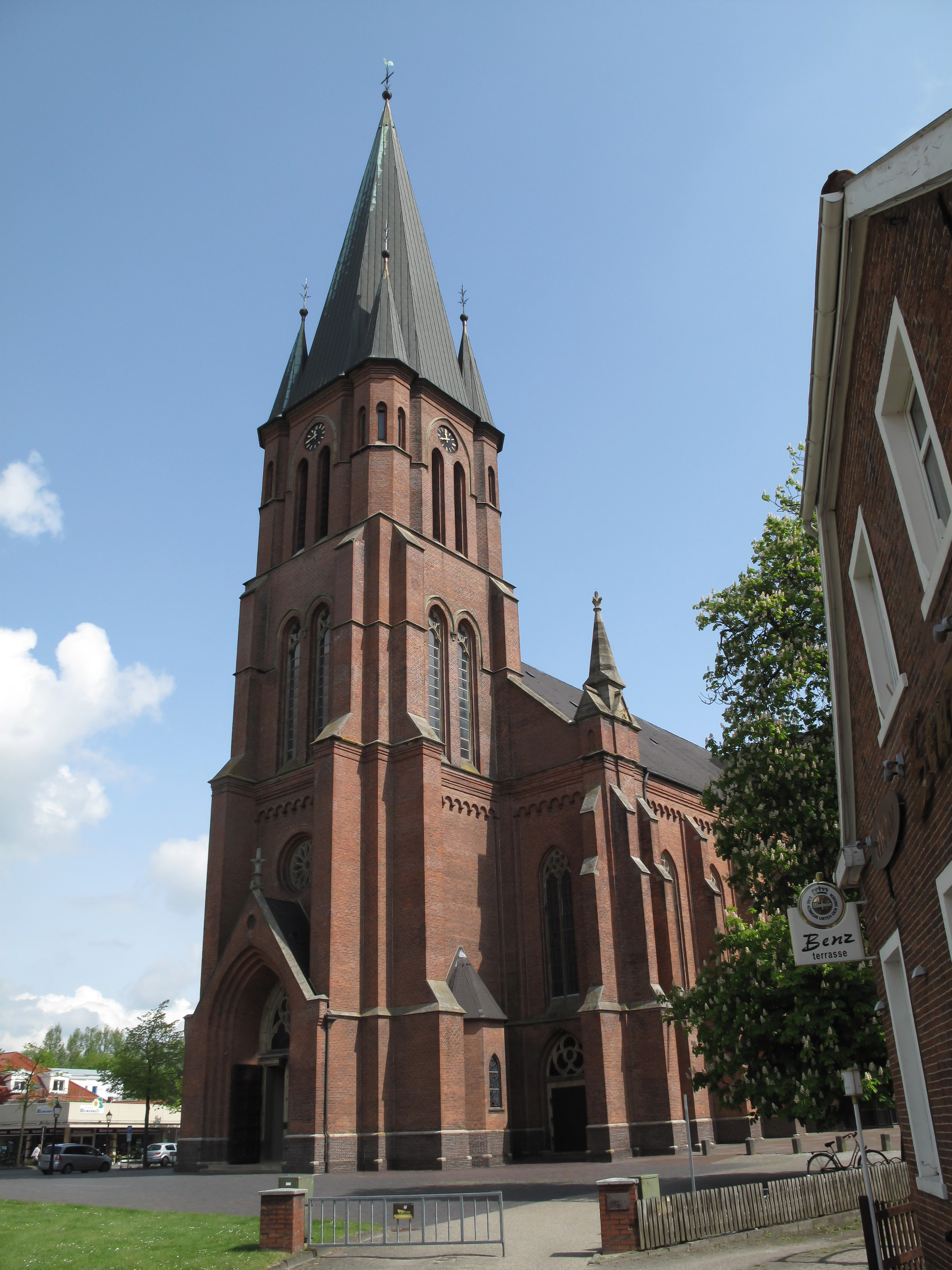
Church of Saint Antonius

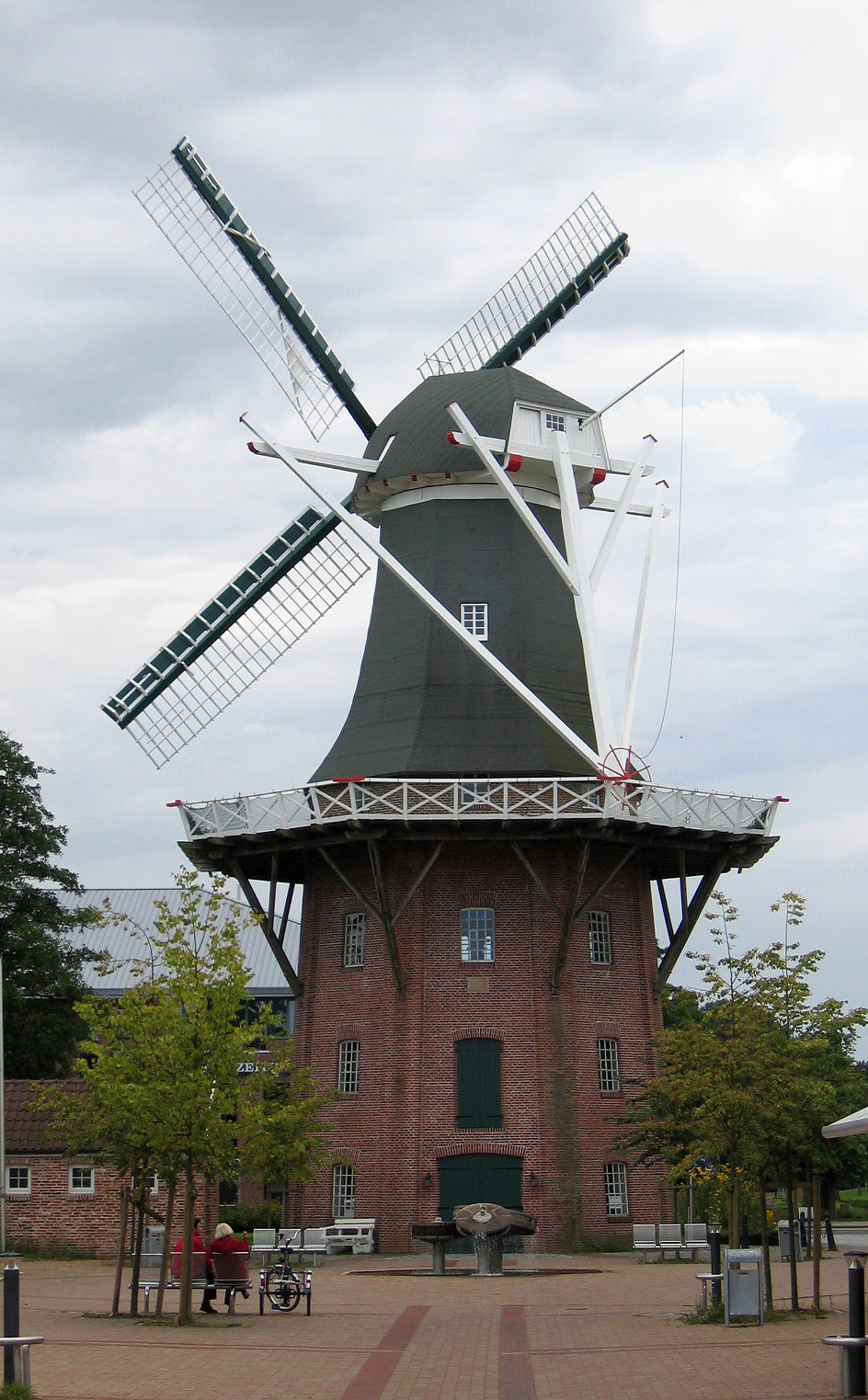
Meyers-Mühle
