= Arcadia (2004 ship) =

Cruise ship

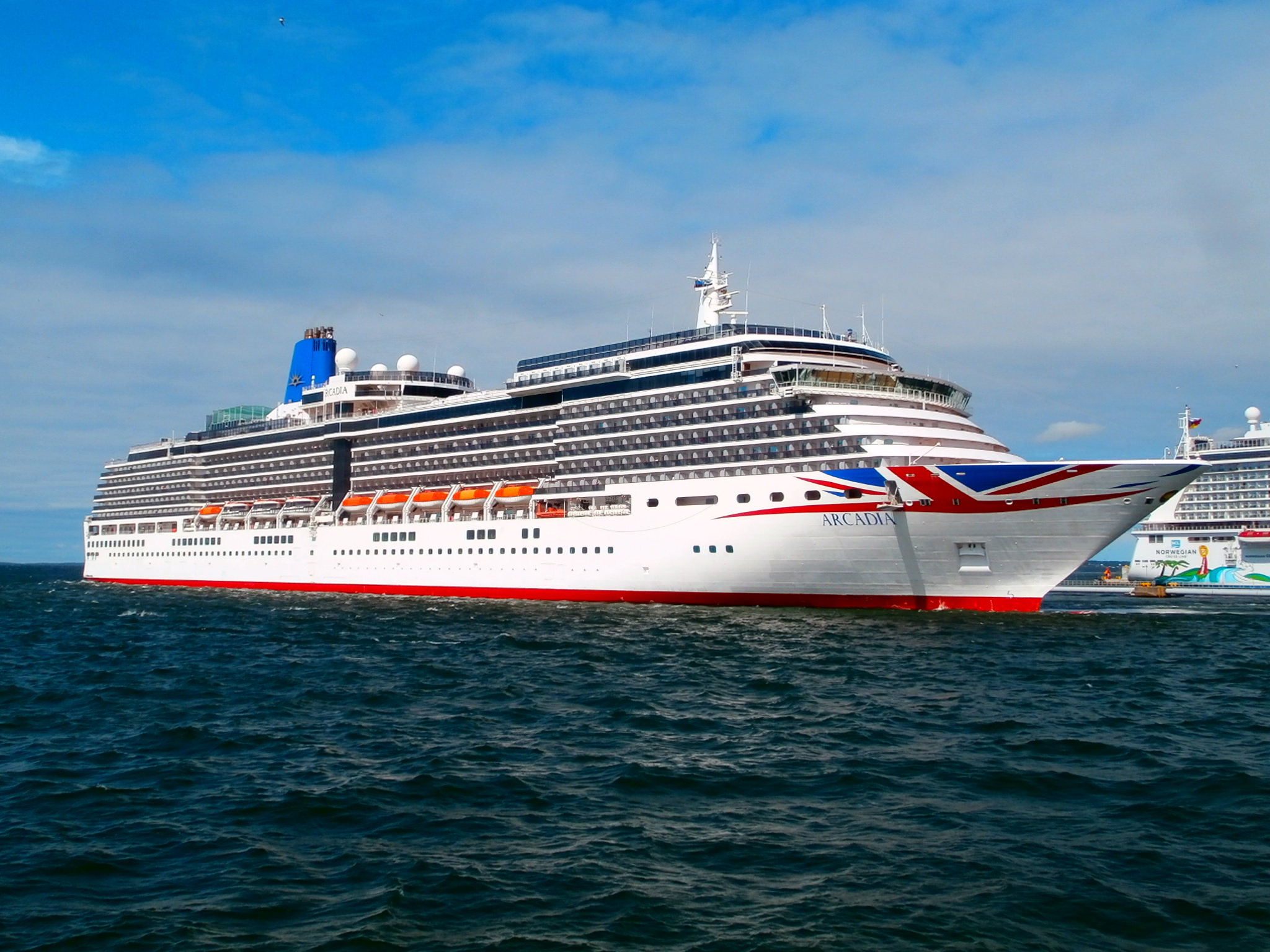
- Arcadia in Tallinn, Estonia, 27 June 2017

History

Bermuda
- Name: Arcadia
- Namesake: The region of Arcadia
- Owner: Carnival plc
- Operator: P&O Cruises until 2029, to be transferred to Holland America Line
- Port of registry: Bermuda, Hamilton
- Ordered: 2000
- Builder: Fincantieri; Porto Marghera, Italy
- Cost: US$400 million
- Yard number: 6078
- Laid down: 12 July 2003
- Launched: 26 June 2004
- Acquired: 29 March 2005
- In service: April 2005
- Identification: Call sign: ZCDN2; IMO number: 9226906; MMSI number: 310459000
- Status: In service

General characteristics
- Class & type: Vista-class cruise ship
- Tonnage: 83,781 GT; 84,342 GT (since 1 March 2014); 10,939 DWT
- Length: 289.90 m (951 ft 1 in)
- Beam: 32.20 m (105 ft 8 in)
- Draught: 8 m (26 ft)
- Decks: 11
- Propulsion: Six Wärtsilä diesel engines; 4 x 16 cyl. ZAV40S; 2 x 12 cyl. ZAV40S; 51,840 kW (69,520 hp) (combined)
- Speed: 22 knots (41 km/h; 25 mph)
- Capacity: 1,952 (regular); 2,094 (maximum)
- Crew: 866

MS Arcadia is a cruise ship in the P&O Cruises fleet. The ship was built by Fincantieri at their shipyard in Marghera, Italy. At over 84,000 gross tonnage (GT), Arcadia is the second smallest of seven ships currently in service with P&O Cruises. The ship officially entered service with the company in April 2005 and was named by Dame Kelly Holmes.

== Design and description ==
The cruise ship also sports a modified Queen Elizabeth 2-style funnel, with cowling removed instead of the traditional P&O style funnel found on the purpose-built Oriana and Aurora. Arcadia along with Aurora are adult only ships.

Arcadia uses the ABB Azipod system which is an azimuthing electric propulsion drive where the propulsion motor is installed inside a submerged azimuthing (unlimited 360 degrees) pod and coupled directly to an extremely short propeller shaft. The variable speed electric (AC/AC) drive produces smooth torque over the entire speed range including zero speed. The Azipod propulsion system gives the ship excellent manoeuvring capabilities. It allows full turns at high speed with a radius of less than a ship length. Almost equal speed can be achieved ahead and astern. Rudders as well as stern thrusters are obsolete if an Azipod propulsion is installed astern as it is capable of providing full thrust in all directions by setting the unit's direction angle simply with the vessel's steering control. The Azipod unit has no mechanical propulsion coupling as electric power is provided by a cable connection only, from the diesel-electric generators to the electric motor installed in the gondola directly behind the propeller. Arcadia has two ABB "AMZ 1250ZM12 LAEZ" Azipod units, with a motor power of 17.6MW.

== Construction and career ==
Arcadia was ordered by Holland America Line in 2000 as their fifth Vista-class vessel. In 2003 she was allocated to Cunard Line to become their Queen Victoria. Shortly before her launch the decision was made to transfer the ship to the P&O Cruises fleet. As a result, Arcadia has a Cunard-style mast similar to those found on Queen Elizabeth 2 and RMS Queen Mary 2.

Arcadia underwent a scheduled, 24-day refit at Lloyd Werft shipyard in Bremerhaven, Germany in 2008. She underwent a major refit to the stern, with 34 cabins added.

In 2017, Arcadia received a second refit at Lloyd Werft.

In 2026, Carnival plc announced that Arcadia would be refurbished and transferred to Holland America Line in 2029.

=== COVID-19 pandemic ===
During the 2020-21 coronavirus layoff, the vessel spent some time moored off Bournemouth, Southwold and Torbay.

== See also ==
- Spirit class - a similar class of Panamax ships operated by Carnival Cruise Lines.
- Radiance class - a similar class of Panamax ships operated by Royal Caribbean International
- Vista class - a similar class of Panamax ships operated by Holland America Line
- Signature-class cruise ship - a similar class of Panamax ships operated by Holland America Line
- Coral Princess and Island Princess - A similar set of Panamax ships operated by Princess Cruises
- Carnival Luminosa and Costa Deliziosa - A set of Panamax ships built for Costa Cruises and currently operated by Costa Cruises and Carnival Cruise Line, derived from the Spirit class and Vista-class designs.
