= Costa Deliziosa =

Cruise ship

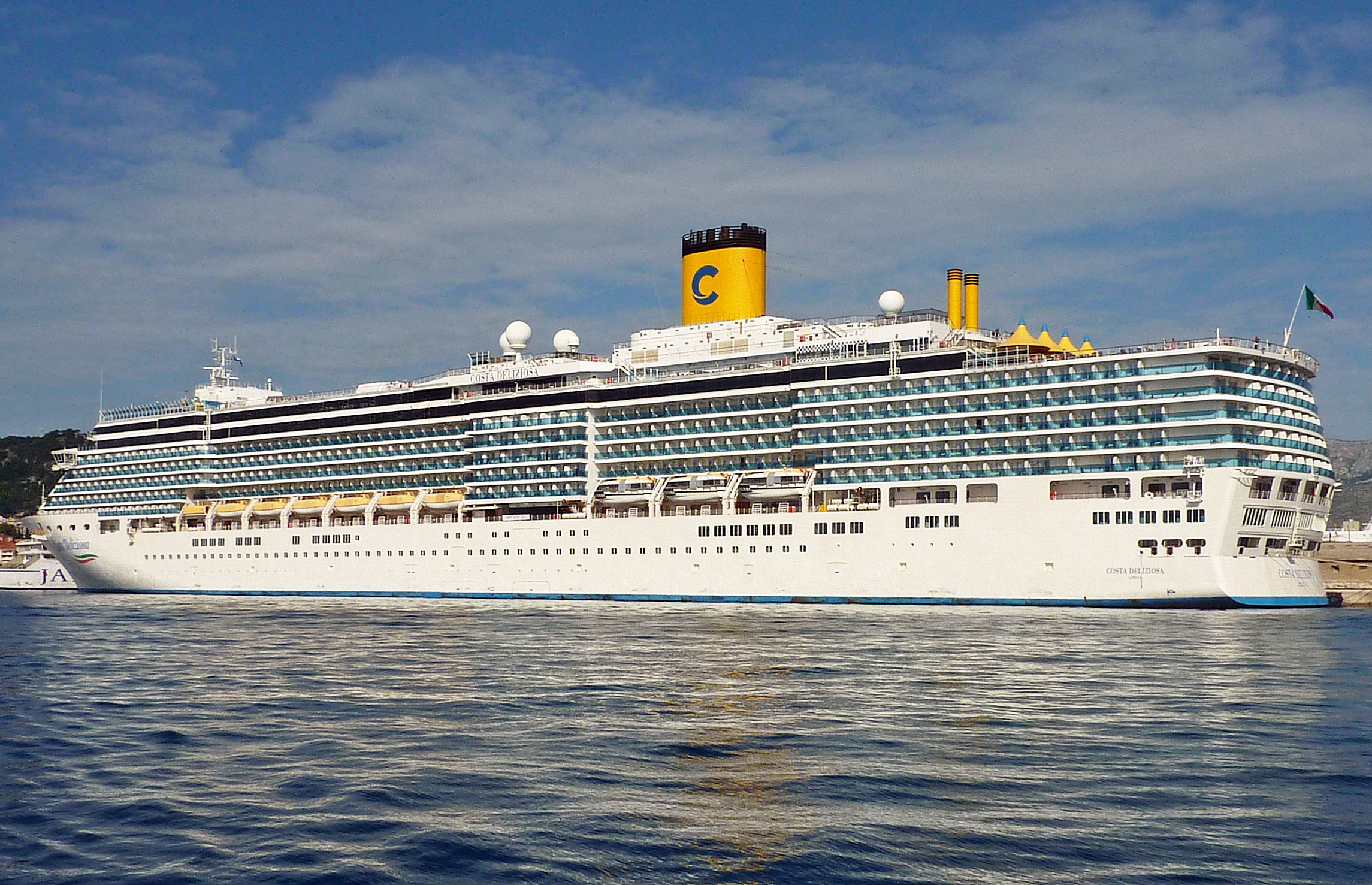
- Costa Deliziosa at Split, Croatia in 2023

History
- Name: Costa Deliziosa
- Owner: Carnival Corporation & plc
- Operator: Costa Crociere
- Port of registry: Italy, Genoa
- Ordered: 2007
- Builder: Fincantieri; Marghera, Venice, Italy
- Cost: €450 million
- Yard number: Venezia 6164
- Launched: 12 March 2009
- Christened: 23 February 2010
- Acquired: 31 January 2010
- Maiden voyage: 5 February 2010
- In service: 2010–present
- Identification: Call sign: IBJD; IMO number: 9398917; MMSI no.: 247282900
- Status: In service

General characteristics
- Class & type: Vista/Spirit-class hybrid cruise ship
- Tonnage: 92,720 GT; 8,000 DWT
- Length: 294 m (964 ft 7 in)
- Beam: 32.3 m (106 ft 0 in)
- Draught: 8 m (26 ft 3 in)
- Decks: 16 (12 for passenger use)
- Speed: 23.6 knots (43.7 km/h; 27.2 mph) (maximum)
- Capacity: 2,260 passengers (double occupancy) 2,828 passengers (maximum)
- Crew: 934

Costa Deliziosa is a cruise ship flagship operated by the Italian cruise line Costa Crociere. Ordered in 2007 as part of a five-ship expansion of the Costa Cruises fleet, Costa Deliziosa was constructed by Fincantieri, launched in March 2009, and handed over to Costa Crociere in January 2010.

== Design and construction ==
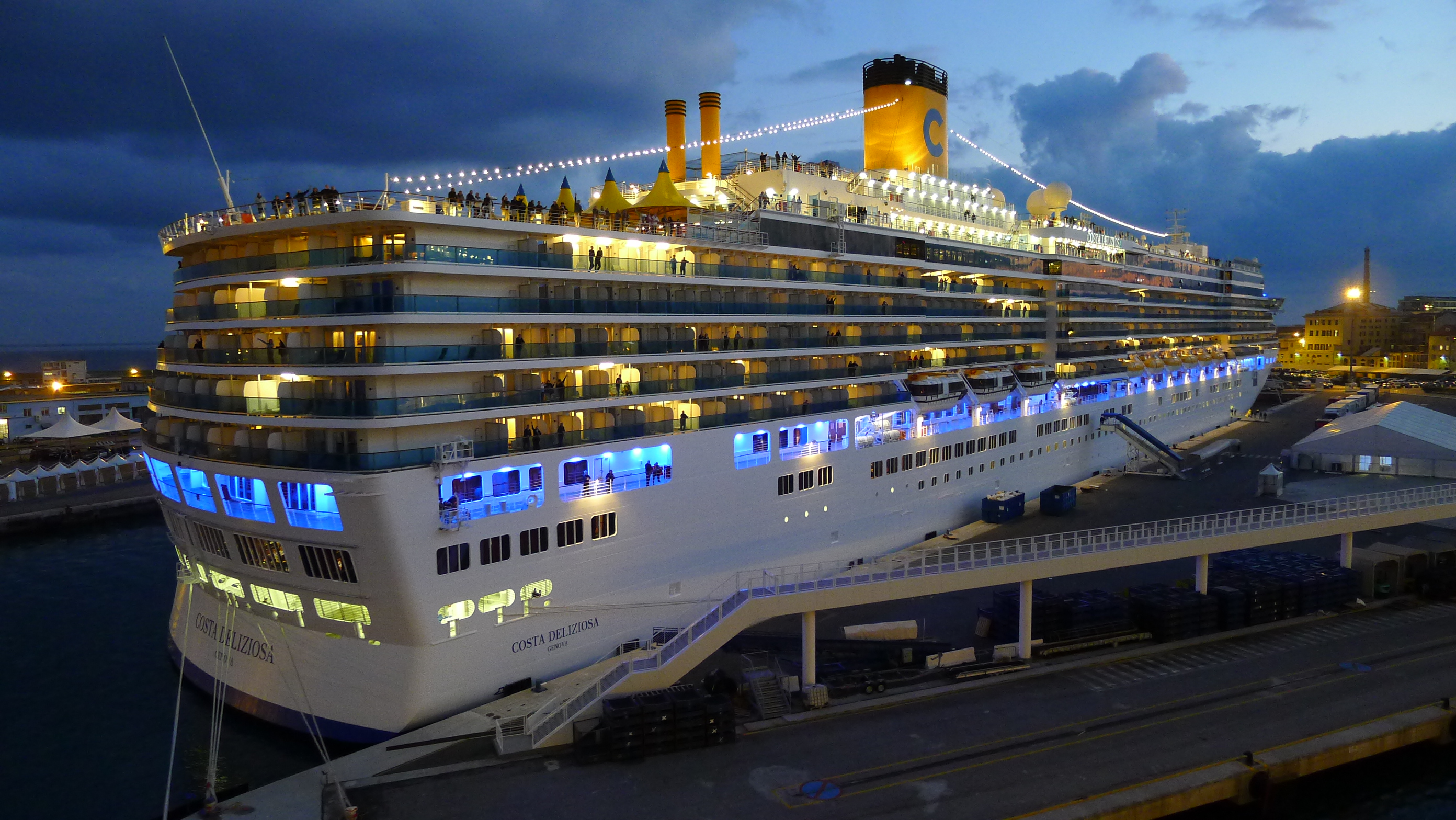
Costa Deliziosa at night

The sister ship of Costa Luminosa, Costa Deliziosa was ordered in 2007 from Italian company Fincantieri. The keel was laid down at the company's shipyard in Ancona. In July 2008, after the keel and first section were completed, they were towed to the Marghera shipyard for further work. She was launched on 12 March 2009, when water was admitted to the drydock in which she was built. The ship was handed over to Costa Cruises on 31 January 2010 at the Venice Passenger Terminal. Costa Deliziosa is the third ship to be delivered by Fincantieri to Costa Cruises in a nine-month period, and one of five new ships to be in service with the company by 2012; a 50 percent expansion in the fleet's passenger capacity.

Costa Deliziosa is 292 metres (958 ft 0 in) long, with a beam of 32.3 metres (106 ft 0 in). The ship has a gross tonnage of 92,700. Up to 2,828 passengers can be carried in 1,130 cabins. The ship has a cruising speed of 21.6 knots (40.0 km/h; 24.9 mph), and a top speed of 23.6 knots (43.7 km/h; 27.2 mph). Around 3,000 people worked on the construction of Costa Deliziosa which cost more than €450 million .

== Christening ==
Costa Deliziosa was christened at Port Rashid in the United Arab Emirates on 23 February, during her inaugural voyage, which started from Savona on 5 February; the first cruise ship in the world to be christened in an Arabian city. In deference to the Muslim faith of Dubai a bottle of special date juice was used rather than the traditional sparkling wine, champagne, or prosecco usually used to christen ships. The christening was planned to coincide with the opening ceremony for the new Port Rashid cruise ship terminal.

== Ports of call ==
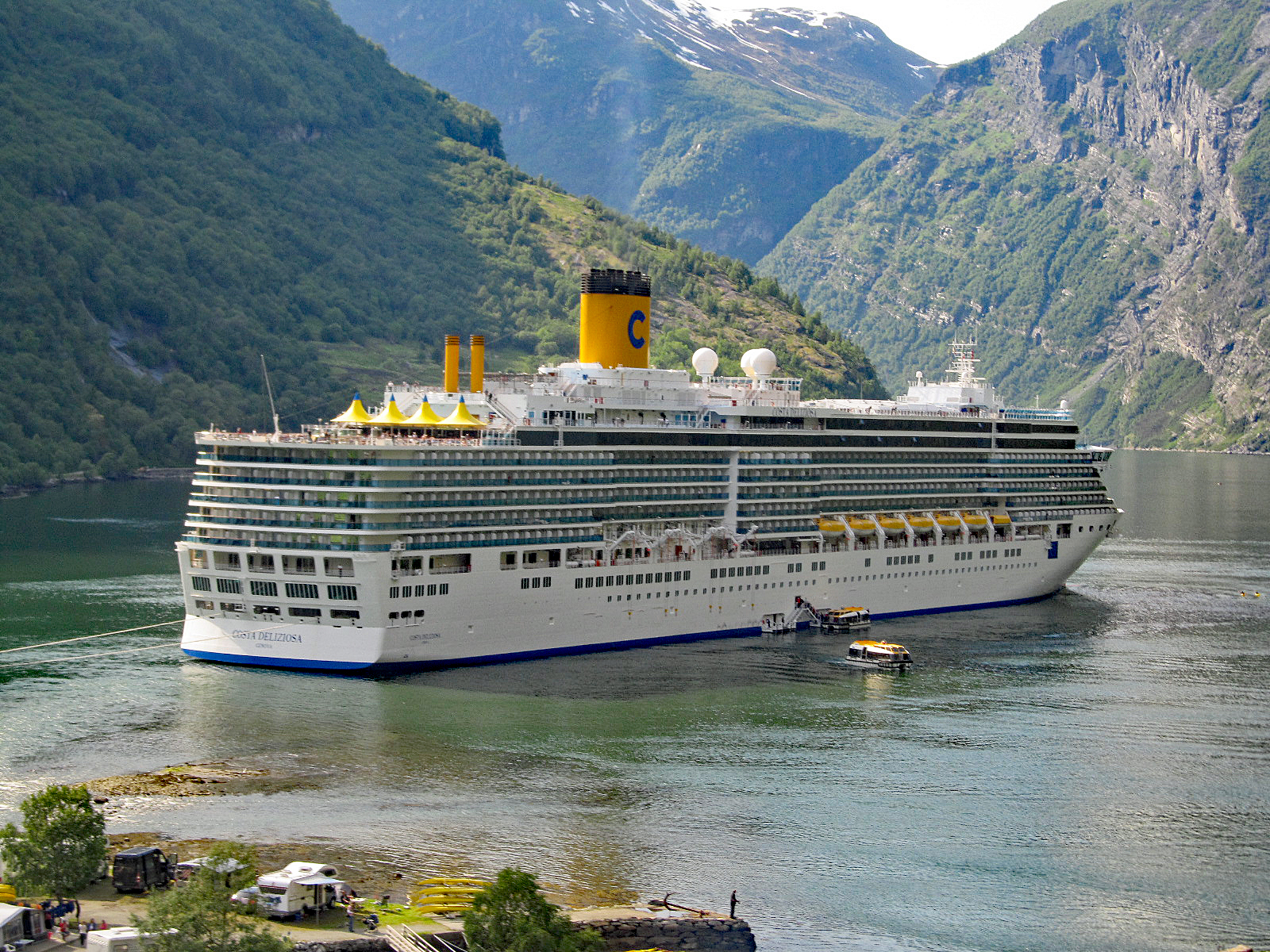
Costa Deliziosa in Geirangerfjord, Norway, 2011.

The ship spent the first part of her career operating on seven-day cruises in the Persian Gulf. During the northern summer, the ship relocated to Copenhagen, for seven-day cruises through the Baltic region.

On 28 December 2011, Costa Deliziosa embarked on a 100-day round-the-world cruise. Departing from Savona, the ship visited the Caribbean, Los Angeles, San Francisco, Hawaii, Samoa, Fiji, New Zealand, Australia, Singapore, Thailand, Sri Lanka, the United Arab Emirates, and Egypt, before returning to Italy.

In 2013 the ship left Northern Europe. Between spring and fall, Costa Deliziosa operated in the Mediterranean Sea, the Canary Islands and Black Sea. All cruises start from Savona. From January to April 2013, and in 2014, she undertook a 100-night world cruise. It was on this world cruise that the vessel rescued eight sailors whose boat had hit an unidentified object mid-Atlantic. The ship's course was altered to rescue the sailors, before it continued to Antigua.

From 2015, every summer she operates in the Eastern Mediterranean region and more specifically offers cruises to Greece and Croatia. In the winter, she does world cruises.

== Incidents ==
=== Coronavirus pandemic ===
During the COVID-19 pandemic, on 3 April 2020, the ship was docked in Muscat, Oman with 1830 guests and 899 crew members; at that time, the company, Costa Crociere, was working to find a suitable port for the ship's final destination. The passengers and crew were observing social distancing and sanitation guidelines.

After not being allowed to have any passengers leave the ship when it arrived in Fremantle, Australia, Costa Deliziosa continued to Europe. On 20 April 183 passengers from the Iberian Peninsula and 112 from France left the vessel when it docked in Barcelona. No cases of COVID-19 had been reported to authorities as of that date. The ship then headed to Genoa, with 1519 passengers and 898 crew members aboard, where it docked on 22 April 2020. It is likely that Costa Deliziosa was the penultimate cruise ship to unload all its passengers during the pandemic, with Artania being the only ship left with passengers on board as of 21 April 2020.

== Gallery ==
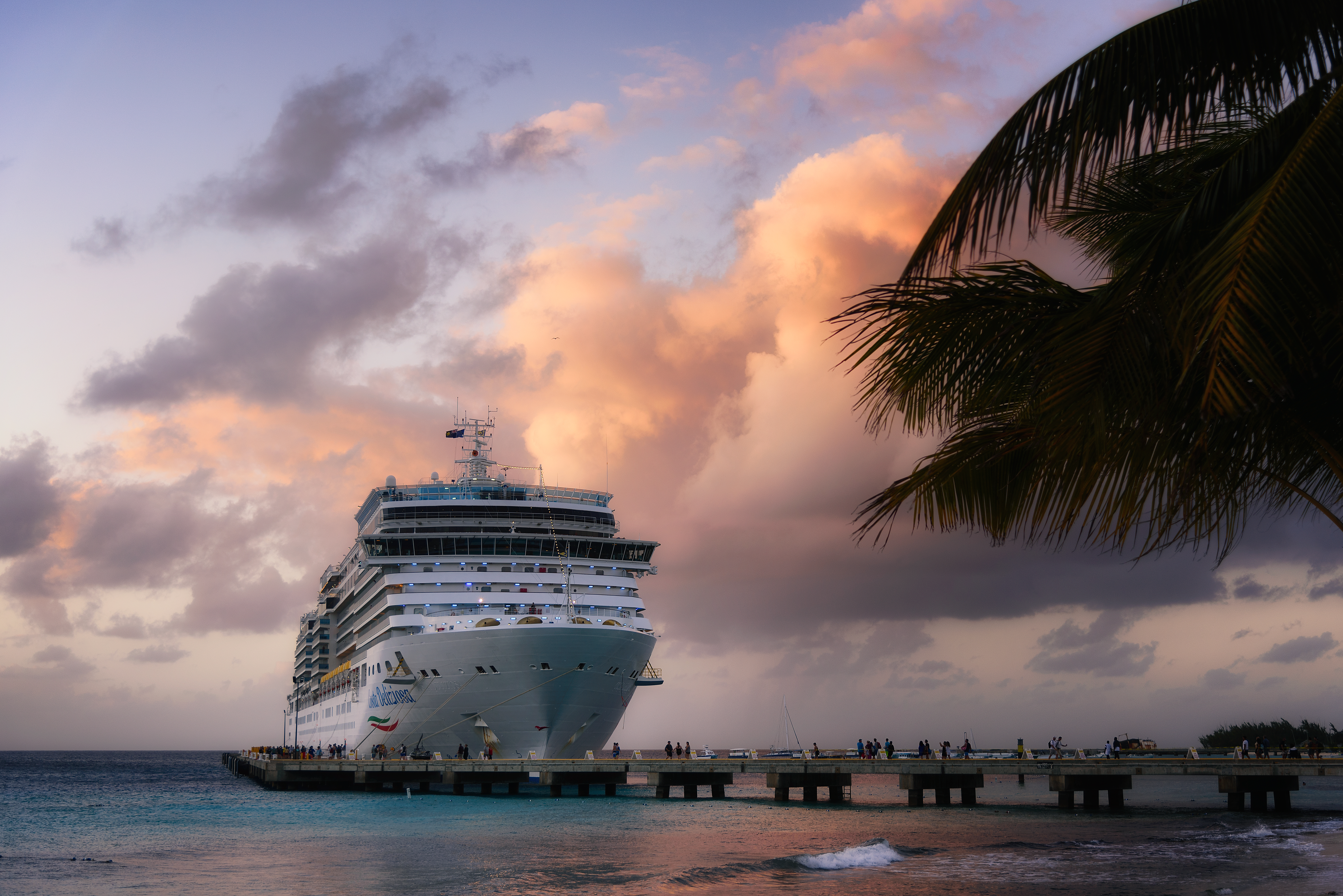
Costa Deliziosa at sunset at Grand Turk Island.

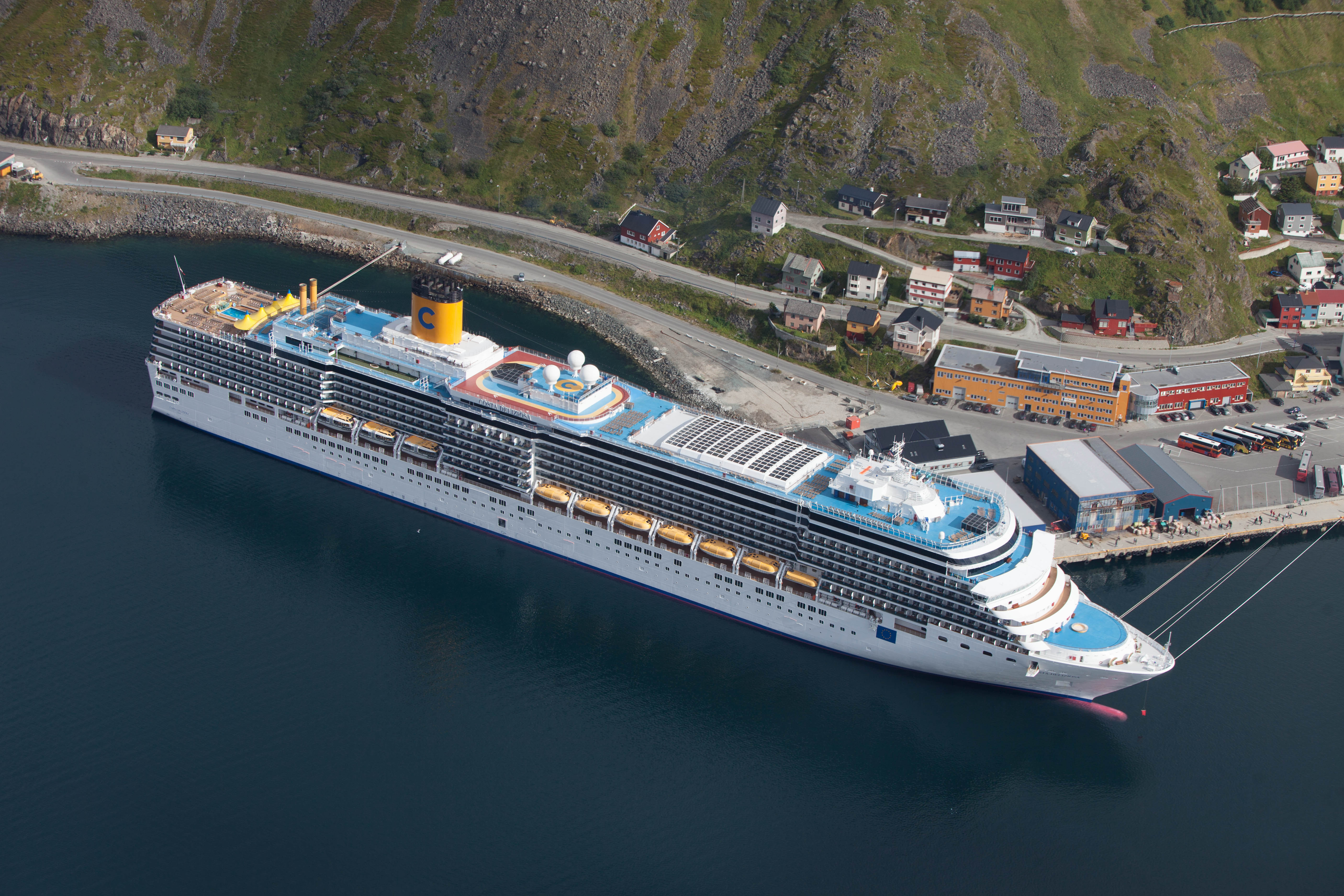
Costa Deliziosa anchoring at Honningsvåg, near North Cape.

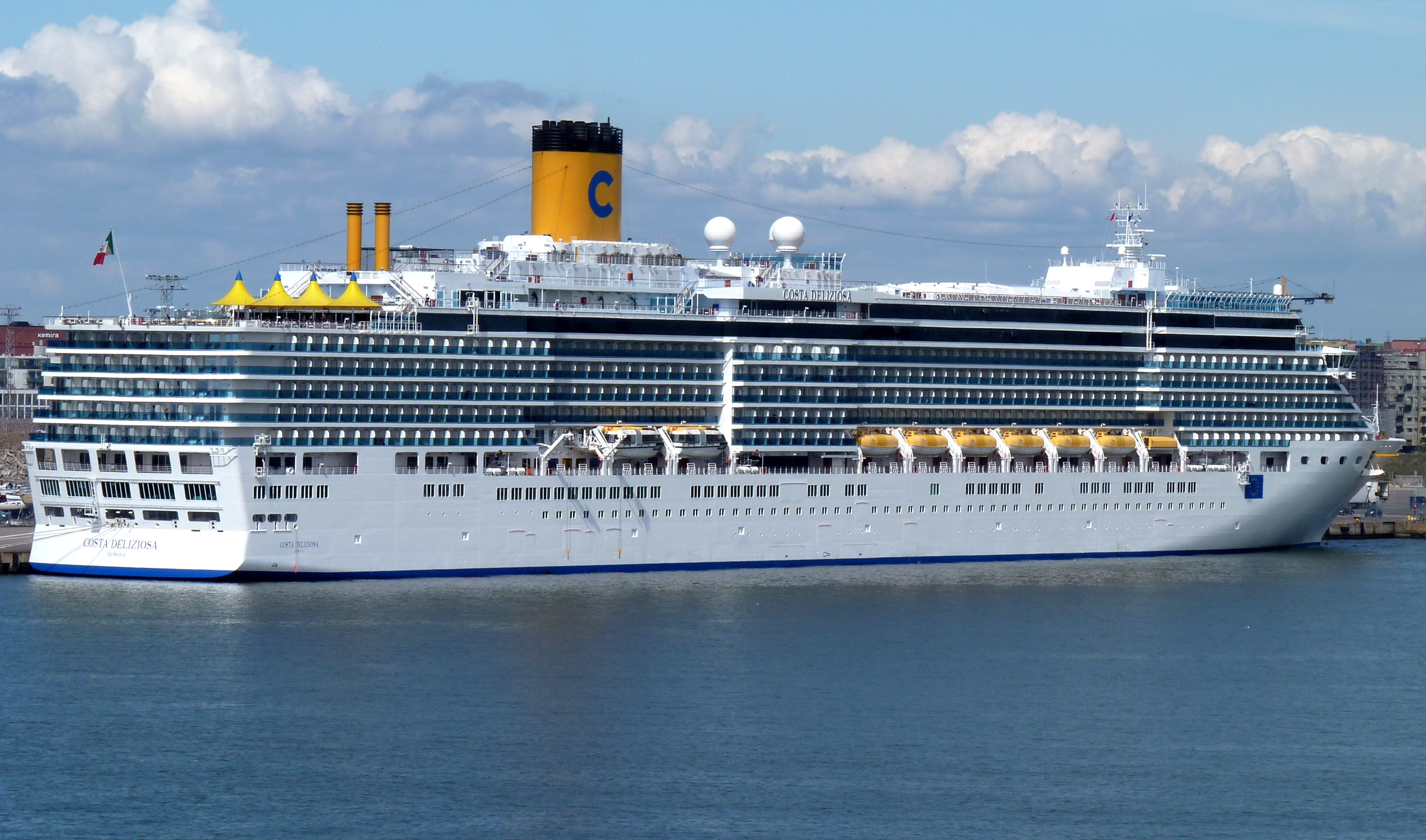
Costa Deliziosa in Helsinki Harbour.

== Similar ships ==
- Spirit class - a similar class of Panamax ships operated by Carnival Cruise Lines.
- Radiance class - a similar class of Panamax ships operated by Royal Caribbean International
- MV Arcadia - a similar Panamax ship operated by P&O Cruises.
- MS Queen Victoria - a similar Panamax sized ship operated by Cunard Line.
- Vista class - a similar class of Panamax ships operated by Holland America Line
- Signature-class cruise ship - a similar class of Panamax ships operated by Holland America Line
- Coral Princess and Island Princess - a similar set of Panamax ships operated by Princess Cruises
