= Carnival Pride =

Cruise ship built in 2002

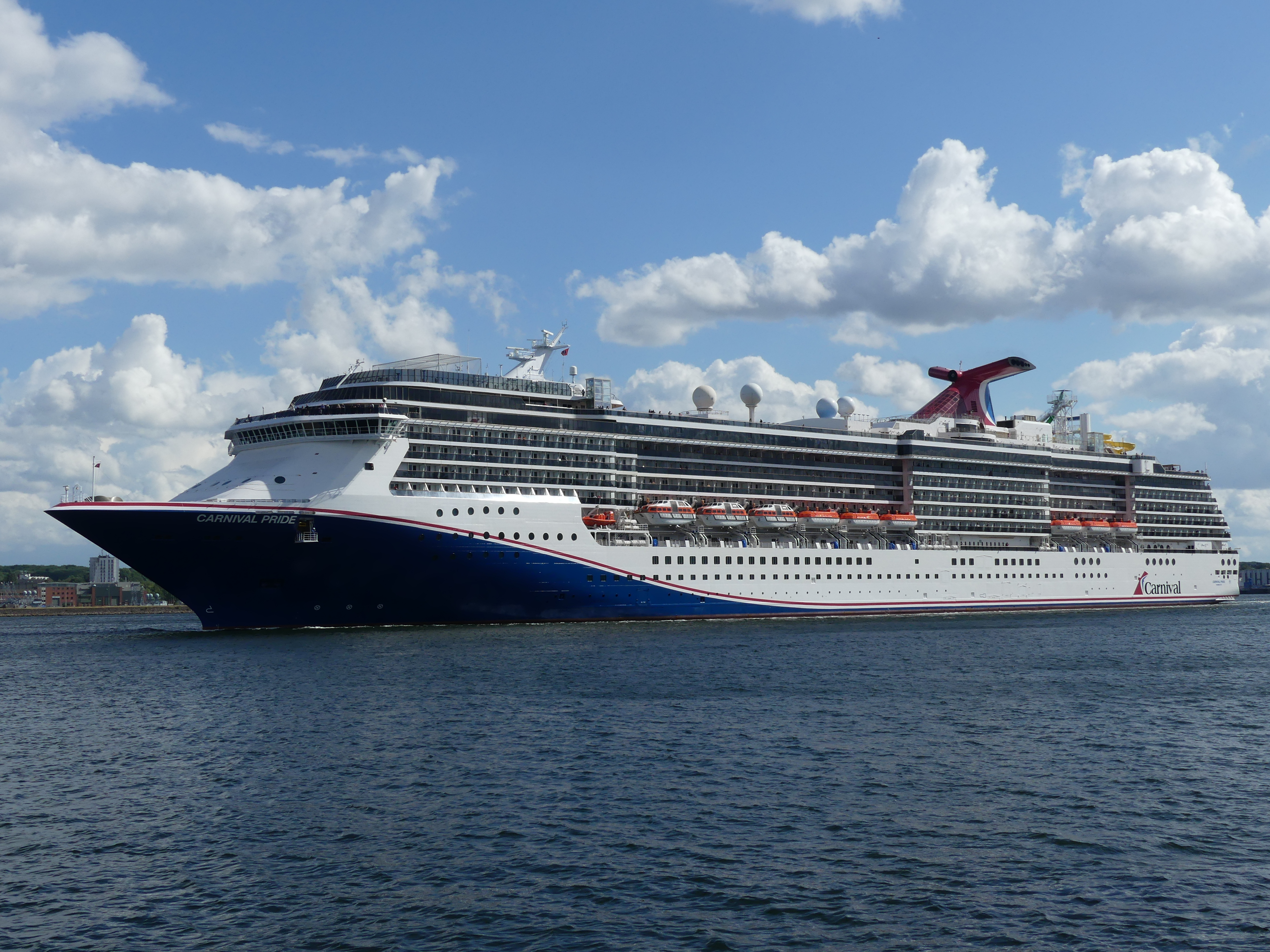
- Carnival Pride in Kiel, 2023

History

Panama
- Name: Carnival Pride
- Owner: Carnival Corporation
- Operator: Carnival Cruise Lines
- Port of registry: Panama City, Panama
- Builder: Kvaerner Masa-Yards; Helsinki New Shipyard; Helsinki, Finland
- Cost: US $375 million
- Yard number: 500
- Laid down: March 30, 2000
- Launched: March 29, 2001
- Sponsored by: Tamara Jernigan
- Christened: January 7, 2002
- Completed: December 12, 2001
- In service: 2002–present
- Identification: Call sign: H3VU; IMO number: 9223954; MMSI number: 354215000
- Status: In service

General characteristics
- Class & type: Spirit-class cruise ship
- Tonnage: 88,500 GT
- Length: 963 ft (294 m)
- Beam: 106 ft (32 m)
- Draft: 25.5 ft (7.8 m)
- Decks: 12 decks
- Installed power: 6 × Wärtsilä 9L46D; 62,370 kW (combined)
- Propulsion: Two ABB Azipods (2 × 17.6 MW)
- Speed: 22 knots (41 km/h; 25 mph)
- Capacity: 2,124 passengers
- Crew: 930

Carnival Pride is a Spirit-class cruise ship operated by Carnival Cruise Line, a subsidiary of Carnival Corporation & plc. Built by Kværner Masa-Yards at its Helsinki New Shipyard in Helsinki, Finland, she was laid down on March 30, 2000, launched on March 29, 2001, and completed and delivered to Carnival on December 12, 2001. She was christened by American scientist and astronaut Tamara Jernigan in Port Canaveral, Florida, on January 7, 2002.

Carnival Pride has 1,062 passenger cabins. She is currently based out of Baltimore.

== Areas of operation ==
Carnival Pride began sailing from Port Canaveral, in January 2002 to Eastern and Western Caribbean ports. Then, from 2002 to March 2009, she sailed year-round cruises from Long Beach, California to the Mexican Riviera.

On March 22, 2009, she sailed a Panama Canal voyage ending in Miami, Florida, and sailed Caribbean cruises out of that port until April 2009.

Since April 2009, Carnival Pride was the first ship to sail year-round Bahamas/Caribbean cruises out of Baltimore, Maryland. From Baltimore, she also sailed a two-day cruise to nowhere without making any port of call from November 2 to 4, 2012, as a result of canceling an October departure due to closed port traffic after Hurricane Sandy.

Carnival Pride sailed out of Tampa in October 2014 until returning to Baltimore in March 2015. In November 2021 Carnival Pride returned to Tampa, with the Carnival Legend taking its place in Baltimore.

== Facilities ==
In October 2014 Carnival Pride entered dry dock for scrubber installation and refurbishment.

The ship is scheduled to undergo another refurbishment in early 2019.

== Accidents and incidents ==
On December 4, 2004, a passenger by the name of Annette Mizener went missing while on board during a family trip. It is unknown if she went overboard willingly, accidentally, or maliciously.

On May 8, 2016, the Carnival Pride collided into the pier in Baltimore, causing a terminal gangway to collapse and crush 3 cars. Nobody was hurt in the incident.
