= Vista Spirit hybrid-class cruise ship =

Hybrid cruise ship class

Vista Spirit hybrid class
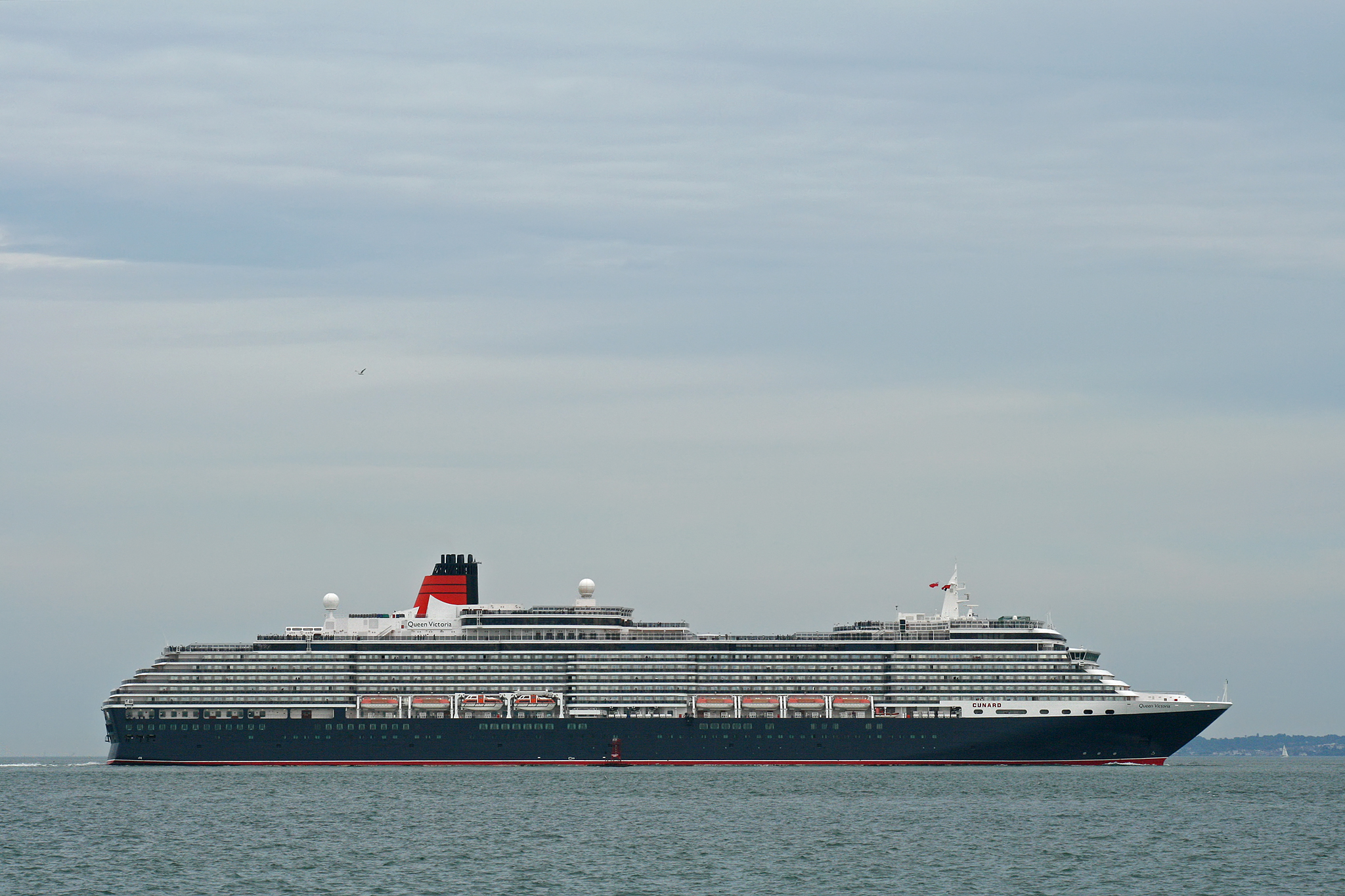
- MS Queen Victoria prior to her 2017 refit

Class overview
- Builders: Fincantieri
- Operators: Cunard Line; Costa Cruises; Carnival Cruise Line
- Preceded by: Spirit class; Vista class
- Succeeded by: Dream class; Pinnacle class
- Built: 2006–2010
- In service: 2007–present
- Planned: 4
- Completed: 4
- Active: 4

General characteristics
- Type: Cruise ship
- Tonnage: 92,700 GT
- Length: 964.5 ft (294.0 m)
- Beam: 106 ft (32 m) waterline, 120 ft (37 m) extreme (bridge wings)
- Height: 205 ft (62 m) keel to funnel
- Draft: 26.2 ft (8.0 m)
- Decks: 16 total, 12 passenger
- Installed power: MS Queen Victoria: Sulzer ZA40 diesel engines; 63,400 kW (85,000 hp) (combined); MS Queen Elizabeth: 4 × MaK 12VM43C; 2 × MaK 8M43C; 64,000 kW (86,000 hp) (combined)
- Propulsion: Diesel-electric; Two ABB Azipods
- Speed: 23.7 knots (43.9 km/h; 27.3 mph) maximum, Service speed 18 knots (33 km/h; 21 mph)
- Capacity: 2,081 passengers
- Crew: 900

The Vista Spirit hybrid-class cruise ship is the culmination of two cruise ship designs. Carnival Corporation had two competing and very similar ship designs, the Vista class and Spirit class. The Italian shipbuilder Fincantieri constructed Vista-class ships for Holland America and P&O Cruises and the Finnish STX shipbuilder built Spirit-class vessels for the Carnival and Costa brands. Both designs incorporated Azipods, and were Panamax ships around 90,000 gross tonnage (GT).

== Background ==
The visual differences between the ships include:

- Vista-class ships had an external observation lift mid-ship on both sides of the ship, a wider forward and aft deck-width and a tiered forward section on the passenger cabin decks. Vista-class vessels also tend to have an additional upper deck just forward of the funnel.
- Spirit-class ships have an alternate wide-narrow-wide-narrow-wide deck width along their length and a flat forward section leading to the bow of the ship with small windows

== Hybrid design ==
The hybrid design was first launched as Queen Victoria in 2007.

The hull, bow, and stern of the Vista Spirit hybrid class are identical; except for Queen Victoria which differs in some details. A 2017 refit for the Queen Victoria fitted additional cabins her stern which makes her more similar in appearance to Queen Elizabeth.

== Ships in class ==
Built	Ship	Operator	Builder	Tonnage	Flag	Notes	Image
2007	Queen Victoria	Cunard Line	Fincantieri	92,700 GT	Bermuda	Received a refit in 2017	
2009	Carnival Luminosa	Carnival Cruise Line	Fincantieri	92,700 GT	Bahamas	As of November 2022, sails as a part of Carnival Cruise Line's Spirit Class	
2010	Costa Deliziosa	Costa Cruises	Fincantieri	92,700 GT	Italy		
2010	Queen Elizabeth	Cunard Line	Fincantieri	92,700 GT	Bermuda		
