= Spirit-class cruise ship =

Class of cruise ship owned by Carnival Corporation & plc

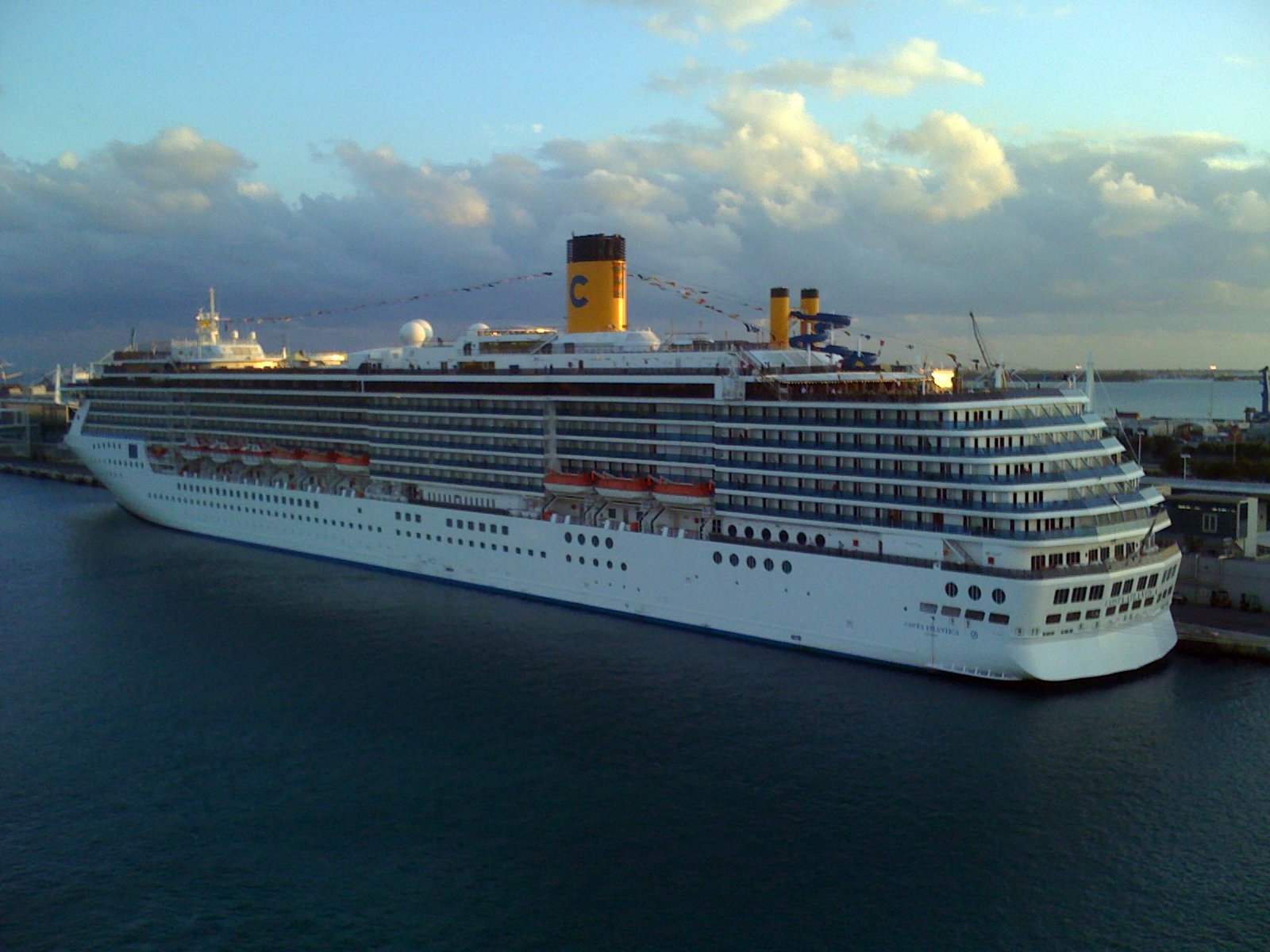
- Costa Atlantica in Miami

Class overview
- Builders: Kvaerner Masa-Yards Helsinki New Shipyard, Finland
- Operators: Carnival Cruise Lines; Costa Cruises (formerly); Adora Cruises; Margaritaville at Sea
- Preceded by: Carnival Cruise Lines: Destiny class; Costa Cruises: Classica class
- Succeeded by: Carnival Cruise Lines: Conquest class; Costa Cruises: Fortuna class
- Subclasses: Vista Spirit hybrid-class cruise ship
- Built: 2000–2004
- In service: 2000–present
- Planned: 8
- Completed: 6
- Canceled: 2
- Active: 6

General characteristics
- Type: Cruise ship
- Tonnage: 85,619–88,500 GT; 7,500 DWT
- Length: 292.56 m (959 ft 10 in)
- Beam: 32.20 m (105 ft 8 in)
- Draft: 7.80 m (25 ft 7 in)
- Decks: 12
- Installed power: 6 × Wärtsilä 9R46; 63,370 kW (84,980 hp) (combined)
- Propulsion: 2 × 17.6 MW ABB Azipod
- Speed: 22 knots (41 km/h; 25 mph)
- Capacity: 2,114–2,680 passengers
- Crew: 930

The Spirit class is a class of cruise ships built at the Kvaerner Masa-Yards Helsinki New Shipyard in Helsinki, Finland. The ships are operated by Carnival Cruise Lines, Adora Cruises and Margaritaville at Sea. The six ships were built to the original Panamax form factor, allowing them to pass through the Panama Canal. This class has the smallest of the signature smoke stacks that Carnival has on their ships. Carnival's Spirit-class ships also feature a unique funnel design that integrates the skylight dome of the atrium.

In 2007 and 2009, Queen Victoria and Costa Luminosa (built by Fincantieri) were introduced. The design of these ships are a hybrid between the Spirit class and the Vista class, creating the Vista/Spirit hybrid class. As of November 2022, Costa Luminosa (now Carnival Luminosa) is marketed by Carnival as a part of their Spirit class.

== Ships ==
Built	Ship	Baseport	Tonnage	Flag	Notes	Image
Margaritaville at Sea
2000	Margaritaville at Sea Islander	Tampa, Florida	85,619 GT	Bahamas	First Spirit-class ship in this line and first Spirit-class ship for Costa. Transferred to CSSC Carnival Cruise Shipping in 2020. Sold to Margaritaville at Sea in 2023.	
Adora Cruises
2003	Adora Mediterranea	Tianjin, China Guangzhou, China Xiamen, China	85,619 GT	Italy	Last Spirit-class ship for Costa. Transferred to CSSC Carnival Cruise Shipping in 2021.	
Carnival Cruise Line
2001	Carnival Spirit	Sydney, Australia Seattle, Washington Mobile, Alabama Tampa, Florida Galveston, Texas	88,500 GT	Bahamas	First Spirit-class ship for Carnival; First ship to in the fleet to sail year round from Australia; Previously based in Australia from 2012–2022	
2001	Carnival Pride	Baltimore, Maryland Tampa, Florida London, England Rome, Italy Barcelona, Spain	88,500 GT	Panama	At one point, she was the flagship of Carnival	Carnival Pride leaving Kiel.
2002	Carnival Legend	Tampa, Florida Baltimore, Maryland Dover, England Galveston, Texas San Francisco, California Seattle, Washington Long Beach (Los Angeles County), California	88,500 GT	Bahamas	In 2009 collided with Enchantment of the Seas, which was already docked, in Cozumel, Mexico; In 2019 collided with Carnival Glory, which was also already docked, in Cozumel, Mexico	
2004	Carnival Miracle	Long Beach (Los Angeles County), California San Francisco, California Galveston, Texas Tampa, Florida Dover, England Rome, Italy	88,500 GT	Panama	Last Spirit-class ship in this line and last Spirit-class ship for Carnival	

== See also ==
- MV Arcadia – a similar Panamax ship operated by P&O Cruises.
- Coral Princess and Island Princess – A similar set of Panamax ships operated by Princess Cruises
- Radiance-class cruise ships – a similar class of Panamax ships operated by Royal Caribbean International
- Signature-class cruise ship – a similar class of Panamax ships operated by Holland America Line
