= Carnival Miracle =

Cruise ship operated by Carnival Cruise Line

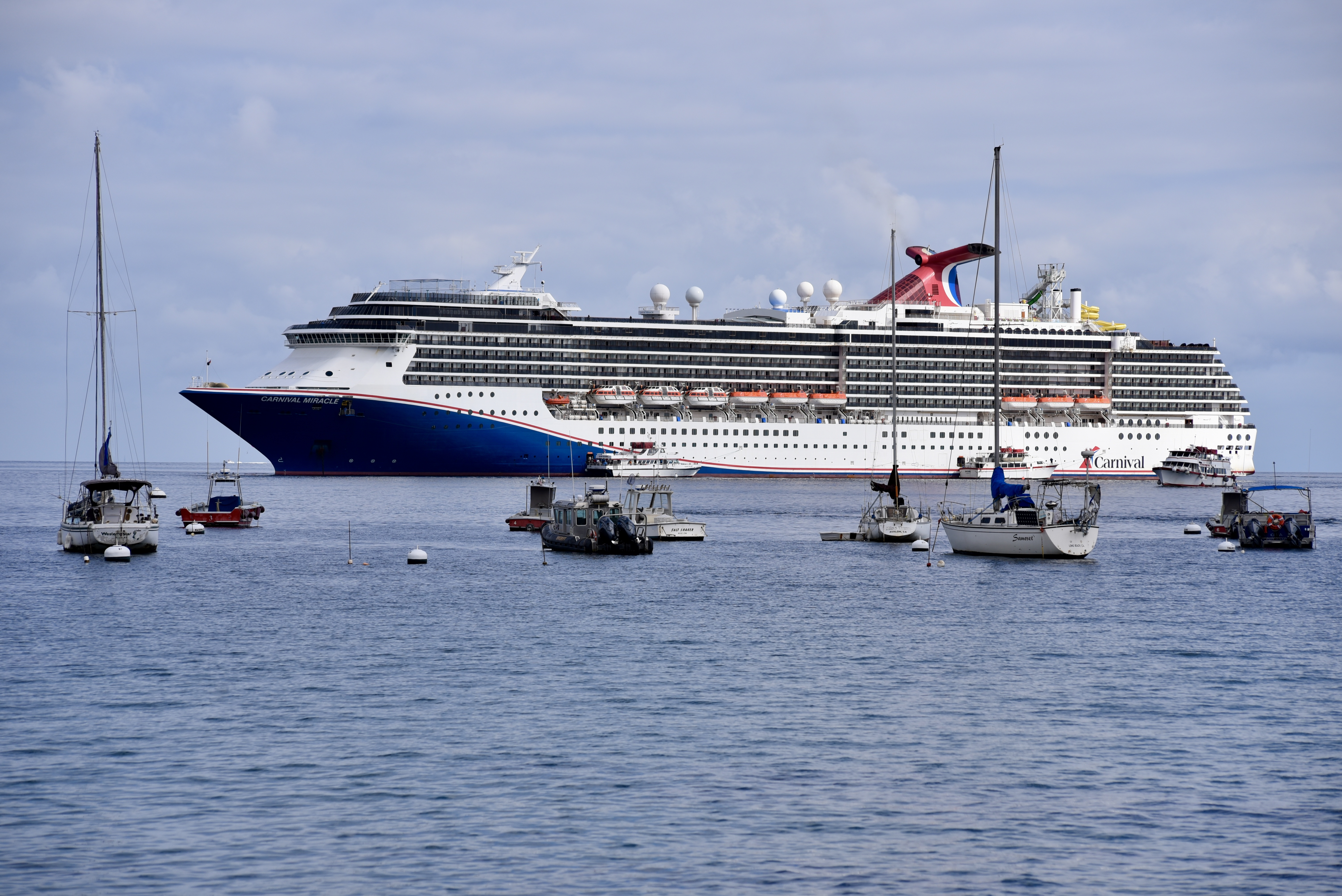
- Carnival Miracle off the coast Santa Catalina Island on February 14, 2024

History
- Name: Carnival Miracle
- Owner: Carnival Corporation & plc
- Operator: Carnival Cruise Line
- Port of registry: Panama City, Panama
- Builder: Kvaerner Masa-Yards; Helsinki New Shipyard; Helsinki, Finland
- Cost: US $375 million
- Yard number: 503
- Launched: June 5, 2003
- Sponsored by: Jessica Lynch
- Christened: February 27, 2004
- Completed: 2004
- Maiden voyage: February 27, 2004 (Bahamas)
- In service: 2004–present
- Home port: Long Beach, CA
- Identification: Call sign: H3VS; IMO number: 9237357; MMSI number: 354277000
- Status: in active service

General characteristics
- Class & type: Spirit-class cruise ship
- Tonnage: 88,500 GT
- Length: 963 ft (294 m)
- Beam: 105.7 ft (32.2 m)
- Draft: 25.5 ft (7.8 m)
- Decks: 12 decks
- Installed power: Six diesel engines; 62,370 kW (combined)
- Propulsion: Two ABB Azipods (17.6 MW each)
- Speed: 22 knots (41 km/h; 25 mph)
- Capacity: 2,124 passengers
- Crew: 930

Carnival Miracle is a Spirit-class cruise ship operated by Carnival Cruise Line. Built by Kværner Masa-Yards at its Helsinki New Shipyard in Helsinki, Finland, she was floated out on June 5, 2003, and christened by United States Army soldier Jessica Lynch in Jacksonville, Florida, on February 27, 2004. Soon after the conclusion of the christening ceremony, she departed on her maiden voyage, a three-day cruise to the Bahamas.

Carnival Miracle has an eleven-story atrium with a ruby-red glass ceiling, which is also part of the "whale tail" funnel. Next to every room is a large picture of a famous fictional character, such as Long John Silver or Sherlock Holmes.

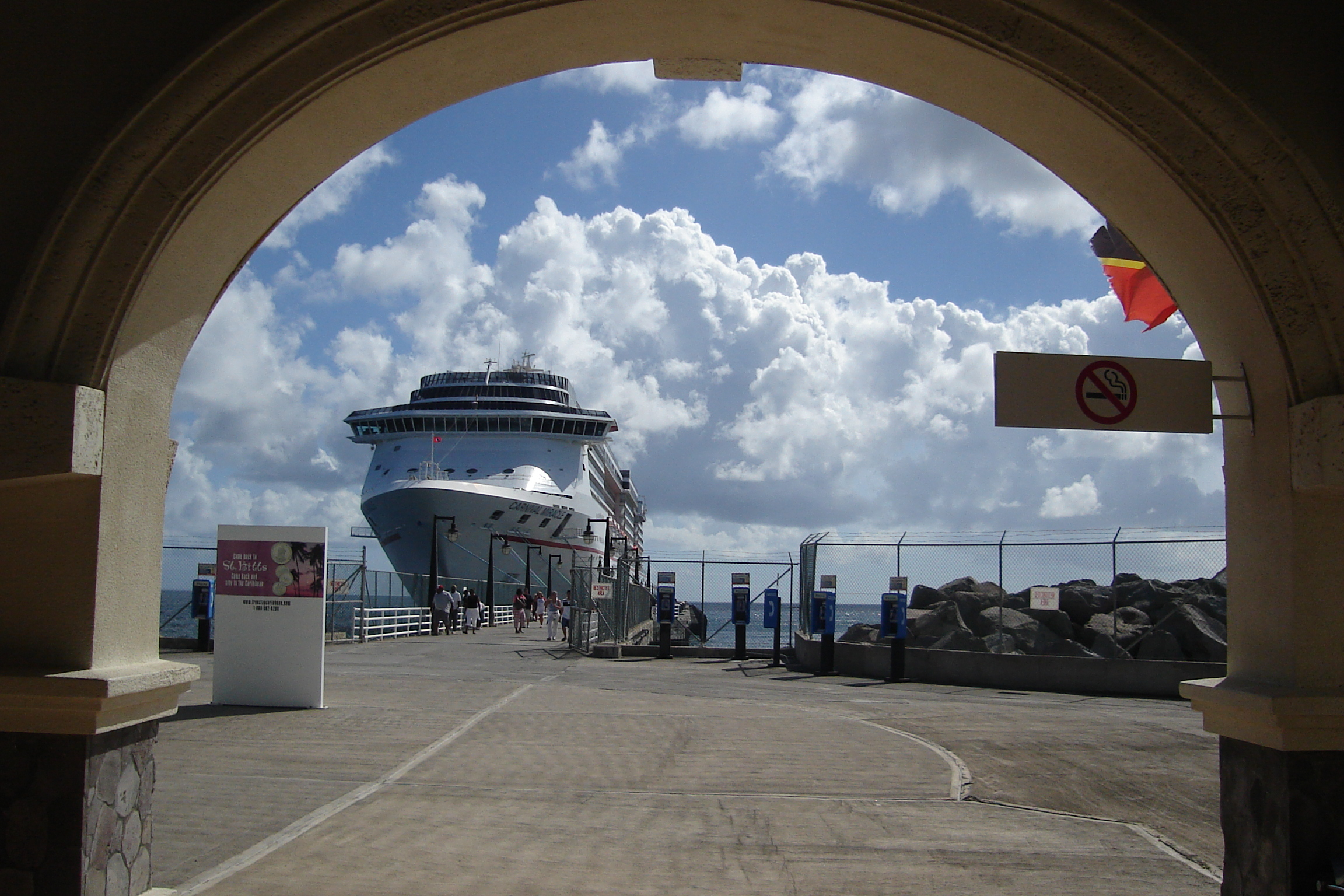
Carnival Miracle at Saint Kitts on November 28, 2007

== Service history ==
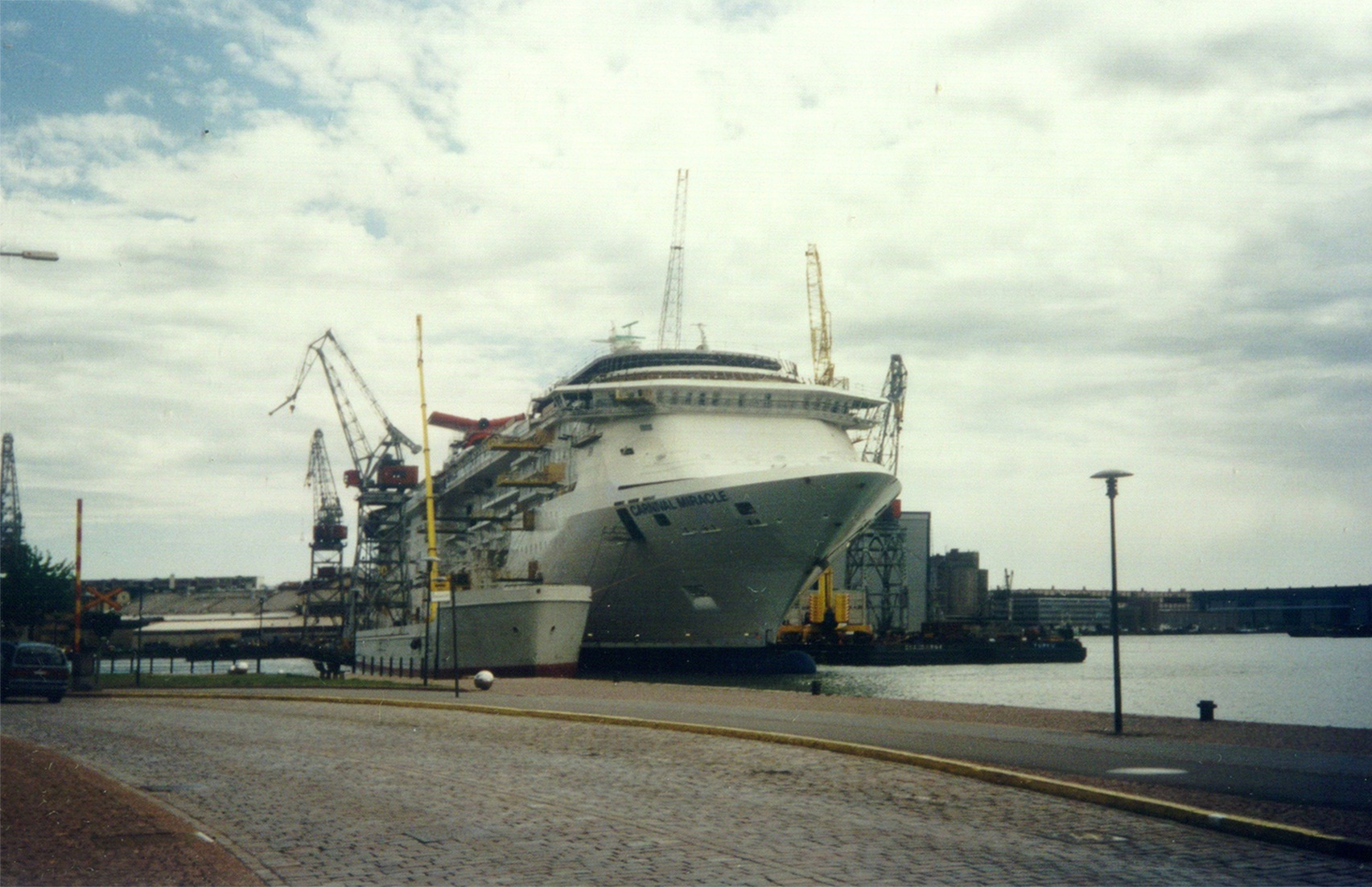
Carnival Miracle under construction at Kvaerner Masa-Yards in Helsinki on June 16, 2003.

Prior to April 2012, Carnval Miracle undertook Caribbean cruises from Fort Lauderdale and Tampa Bay, Florida during the winter months and during the summer months from New York City. From April 2012 to March 2013, Carnival Miracle sailed year-round from New York City, New York to the Bahamas and the Caribbean. In March 2013, Carnival Miracle sailed through the Panama Canal repositioning to the West Coast sailing alternating cruises from Long Beach, California and Seattle, Washington.

On March 8, 2015, Miracle entered "Drydock #2" operated by BAE Systems at Pier 70 in San Francisco, California to be refurbished. In October 2015, Carnival announced that Carnival Miracle, would be repositioned to China in 2018 offering year-round short cruises. This plan was subsequently cancelled in May 2016 and in November 2016, Carnival announced that the vessel would instead relocate to Tampa, Florida in January 2018 to undertake cruises to the western Caribbean.

On January 27, 2018, Carnival Miracle departed on her first sailing from the new homeport. Before reaching Tampa, the ship transited the Panama Canal. In June 2018, the cruise line announced that Carnival Miracle would reposition to San Diego, California, in late 2019 operating until February 2020. However, when Carnival Splendor repositioned from Long Beach to Sydney, Australia, in October 2019, Carnival Miracle was temporarily homeported at the Port of Long Beach. She did seven-day Mexican Riviera cruises, serving as a placeholder for Carnival Panorama until the latter took over the itinerary on December 11, 2019. Carnival Miracle also performed seasonal repositionings to San Francisco during the spring and summer months beginning March 19, 2020.

In March 2023, it was announced that Carnival Miracle would reposition to Galveston, Texas, in October 2024 and will be the fourth ship based out of that homeport. The ship will offer longer nine to twelve day sailings to the Western and Eastern Caribbean.
