= Carnival Legend =

Spirit-class cruise ship

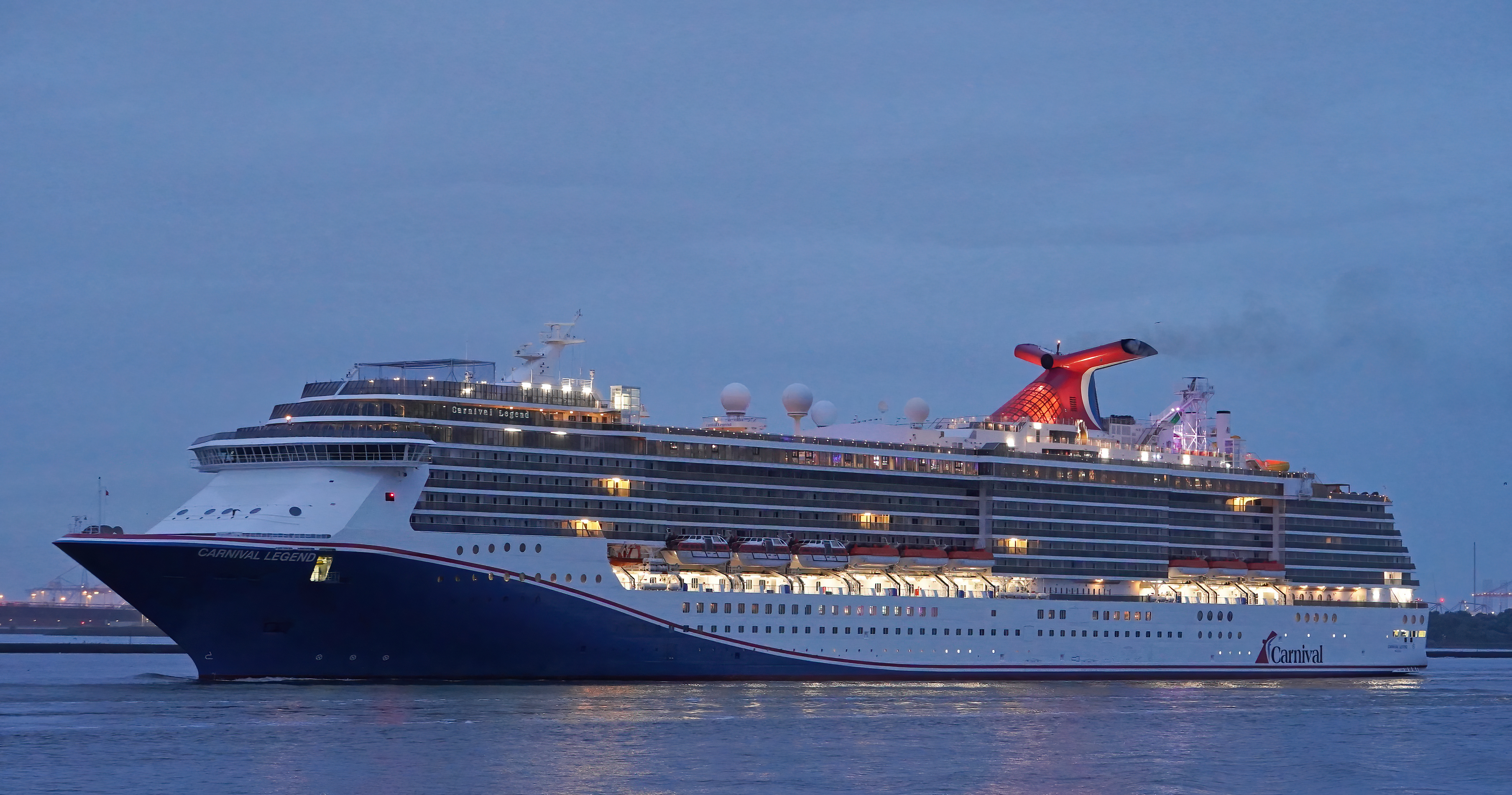
- Carnival Legend near Hook of Holland, 2024

History

Bahamas
- Name: Carnival Legend
- Owner: Carnival Corporation
- Operator: Carnival Cruise Line
- Port of registry: Nassau, Bahamas; (2021–present); Valletta, Malta; (2014–2021); Panama City, Panama; (2002–2014)
- Route: West Pacific, Alaska
- Builder: Kvaerner Masa-Yards; Helsinki New Shipyard; Helsinki, Finland
- Cost: US$375 million
- Yard number: 501
- Way number: 011207
- Launched: 17 December 2001
- Sponsored by: Dame Judi Dench
- Christened: 21 August 2002
- Completed: 14 August 2002
- In service: August 2002–present
- Identification: Call sign: 9HA3667; IMO number: 9224726; MMSI number: 229857000
- Status: In service

General characteristics
- Class & type: Spirit-class cruise ship
- Tonnage: 88,500 GT
- Length: 963 ft (294 m)
- Beam: 105.6 ft (32.2 m)
- Draft: 25.5 ft (7.8 m)
- Decks: 12 decks
- Installed power: 62,370 kW (combined)
- Propulsion: Diesel-electric; two ABB Azipod units (17.6 MW each)
- Speed: 22 knots (41 km/h; 25 mph)
- Capacity: 2,124 passengers
- Crew: 930

Carnival Legend is a Spirit-class cruise ship operated by Carnival Cruise Line. Built by Kværner Masa-Yards at its Helsinki New Shipyard in Helsinki, Finland, she was floated out on 17 December 2001, and christened by English actress and author Dame Judi Dench in Harwich, Essex, UK, on 21 August 2002. Her maiden voyage, Carnival's first cruise in Europe, was a three-night journey from Harwich to Amsterdam and return.

Eighty percent of Carnival Legend's staterooms have ocean views and eighty percent of those have private balconies. She was the first Carnival ship to offer alternative dining options and an onboard wedding chapel.

== Ports of call ==
In 2013, Carnival Legend offered a series of Baltic and Mediterranean cruises from April to November. The ship then offered 7-day cruises to the Western Caribbean from Tampa, Florida.

Following the success of the Carnival Spirit, Carnival Legend underwent a major dry-dock refurbishment in February 2014. In August 2014, she departed Tampa and made her way through the Panama Canal to reposition to Australia. From 2014 to 2019, Carnival Legend sailed seasonally from Sydney on 8-day/12-day cruises to the Pacific Islands from September to April and cruised around Alaska from Seattle in the summer seasons.

== Accidents and incidents ==
=== Bottle smashing issue ===
On 21 August 2002, during the christening ceremony, Judi Dench took three attempts to smash the bottle against the ship's hull, aided by ship's captain Claudio Cupisti. The third attempt successfully smashed the bottle but Dench was sprayed with champagne as a result.

=== Listing ===
On 13 July 2005, Carnival Legend departed Tortola and was heading back to New York City. At 5:10 PM, the ship suddenly listed to the port side while making a hard starboard turn, resulting in some minor injuries. The crew announced afterwards that there had been a computer glitch. The ship's promenade had to be closed for several hours due to broken glass.

On 29 August 2016 at approximately 6:15 pm PT while sailing to Victoria, British Columbia, the turning valve in one of the ship's four engines failed, causing the ship to make a hard port side turn and list to the port side. Captain Giuseppe Gazzano had manually controlled the ship towards Victoria as safety precaution. There were no reported serious injuries but the ship arrived at Victoria two hours behind schedule.

=== Engine room overheating ===
On 3 August 2005, around 22:00, heavy smoke was seen coming from the lower levels towards the bow of the ship. Passengers were requested to move to the upper, open decks. The cruise director announced that "there was a problem in the engine room and that something had overheated". Passengers remained in the open air until the issue was corrected.

=== Passenger suicide ===
During a 20 May 2006 cruise, a 35-year-old passenger from Plumstead, Pennsylvania, was presumed dead after jumping off the Carnival Legend at 1 am on Saturday, 27 May 2006. He was reported to have jumped out of his balcony room after an argument with his wife in front of his children, 450 miles northeast of Florida. The ship remained in the vicinity for eleven hours, delaying the Legend's arrival back to New York City the following day until 8 pm. Coast Guard officials were sent out to aid in the search, but his body was never located.

=== Collision with Enchantment of the Seas ===
On 30 September 2009, as Carnival Legend was leaving the berth in Cozumel, heavy winds pushed the ship against the side of Royal Caribbean Cruise Lines' Enchantment of the Seas. Carnival Legend sustained damage to her open deck areas, as well as broken glass.

=== Mechanical issue ===
On 13 February 2010, Carnival Legend had to reduce speed and return to her home port due to a mechanical problem that drastically reduced the ship's speed. Passengers reported hearing grinding noises and vibrations coming from the engine room. The ship made it back to its home port of Tampa several hours late. The next voyage resulted in a late departure and a schedule change of Cozumel instead of Grand Cayman.

=== Azipod failure ===
On 13 March 2013, a technical issue with one of the ship's Azipods affected the ship's sailing speed. As a result, Carnival Legend failed to reach her next scheduled port call in Belize City, Belize. She instead stopped in Costa Maya, Mexico, then proceeded to her next scheduled port call in Roatan, Honduras on 14 March 2013. Her visit to Grand Cayman scheduled for 15 March 2013 was cancelled shortly after the ship departed from Roatan. Further technical issues affected the itineraries of the subsequent sailings on 17 March 2013 and 24 March 2013. The U.S. Coast Guard announced an investigation of the incident.

=== Brawl ===
In February 2018, violent brawls erupted during a 10-day journey in the South Pacific. Police removed six men and three teenage boys from the ship during an unscheduled stop in Eden, New South Wales. Other passengers reported that they had locked themselves in their cabins for safety and that a large family group had been picking fights during the cruise. Up to 30 people were injured. Video footage showed security guards and other staff kicking a passenger on the ground.

=== Collision with Carnival Glory ===
On 20 December 2019 Carnival Legend was struck by Carnival Glory in Cozumel, while Glory was maneuvering to dock alongside it. One passenger on board the Carnival Glory sustained a minor injury.

=== Francis Scott Key Bridge collapse ===
Following the collapse of the Francis Scott Key Bridge on 26 March 2024, Carnival Legend was rerouted to Norfolk, Virginia.
