= Carnival Spirit =

Spirit-class cruise ship

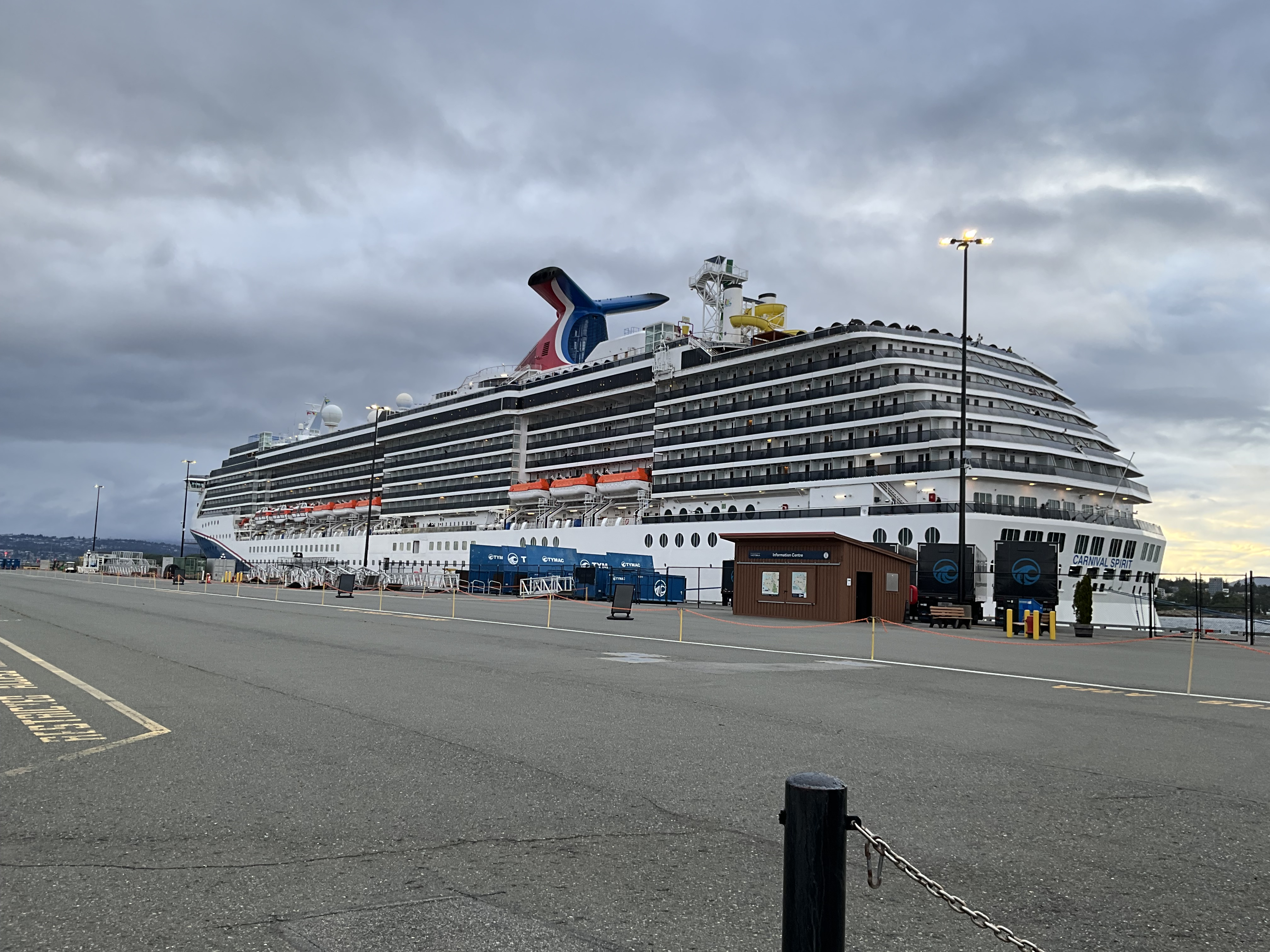
- Carnival Spirit docked at Ogden Point in Victoria, British Columbia, Canada wearing Carnival’s Blue Bow Livery from Carnival Mardi Gras on 19 May 2025

History

Bahamas
- Name: Carnival Spirit
- Owner: Carnival Corporation
- Operator: Carnival Cruise Line
- Port of registry: 2001–2012: Panama City, Panama; 2012–2021: Valletta, Malta; 2021–present: Nassau, Bahamas
- Route: Various
- Builder: Kvaerner Masa-Yards; Helsinki New Shipyard; Helsinki, Finland
- Cost: US$375 million
- Yard number: 499
- Launched: 7 July 2000
- Sponsored by: Elizabeth Dole
- Christened: 27 April 2001
- Completed: 11 April 2001
- Maiden voyage: 29 April 2001
- In service: 2001–present
- Identification: Call sign: 9HA3097; IMO number: 9188647; MMSI number: 229136000
- Status: in active service

General characteristics
- Class & type: Spirit-class cruise ship
- Tonnage: 88,500 GT
- Length: 963 ft (293.52 m)
- Beam: 106 ft (32.31 m)
- Draft: 25.5 ft (7.77 m)
- Decks: 12 decks
- Installed power: 62,370 kW (83,640 hp)
- Propulsion: Diesel-electric; 2 × ABB Azipods; (17.6 MW (23,600 hp) each)
- Speed: 22 knots (41 km/h; 25 mph)
- Capacity: 2,124 passengers
- Crew: 930

Carnival Spirit is a Spirit-class cruise ship operated by Carnival Cruise Line, a subsidiary of Carnival Corporation & plc. Built in Helsinki by Kværner Masa-Yards, she was the first Spirit-class cruise ship to join Carnival's fleet after she was delivered in 2001.

== Construction ==
Built by Kværner Masa-Yards at its Helsinki New Shipyard in Helsinki, Finland, Carnival Spirit was launched on 7 July 2000 and completed on 11 April 2001. She was formally named by American politician Elizabeth Dole in Miami, Florida, on 27 April 2001.

== Service history ==
Previously in the northern fall and winter seasons, Carnival Spirit sailed cruises from San Diego and Los Angeles to the Mexican Riviera. After Carnival Spirit's repositioning out of San Diego in April 2012, Carnival ceased operations with that port. During the period from mid-May and ending in September (northern summer), Carnival Spirit sailed the waters alongside the Alaskan Inside Passage on alternating one-week northbound and southbound voyages calling in Vancouver and Seattle. In December 2011, Carnival Spirit sailed to the Hawaiian Islands.

After Carnival Spirit finished her Alaskan and Hawaii cruises, she embarked on a transpacific crossing, calling in Tahiti and Fiji to reposition to Sydney, Australia, arriving on 16 October 2012. It marked the first time Carnival based a ship permanently outside North America. She had undergone a dry dock in San Francisco nine months prior to prepare her for the Australian deployment, which included installing Australian-style power points, as well as changing the on-board currency to the Australian dollar. The total cost of the renovations was estimated to total US$7 million. She sailed her first voyage from Sydney, to the South Pacific and New Zealand, from 20 October 2012.

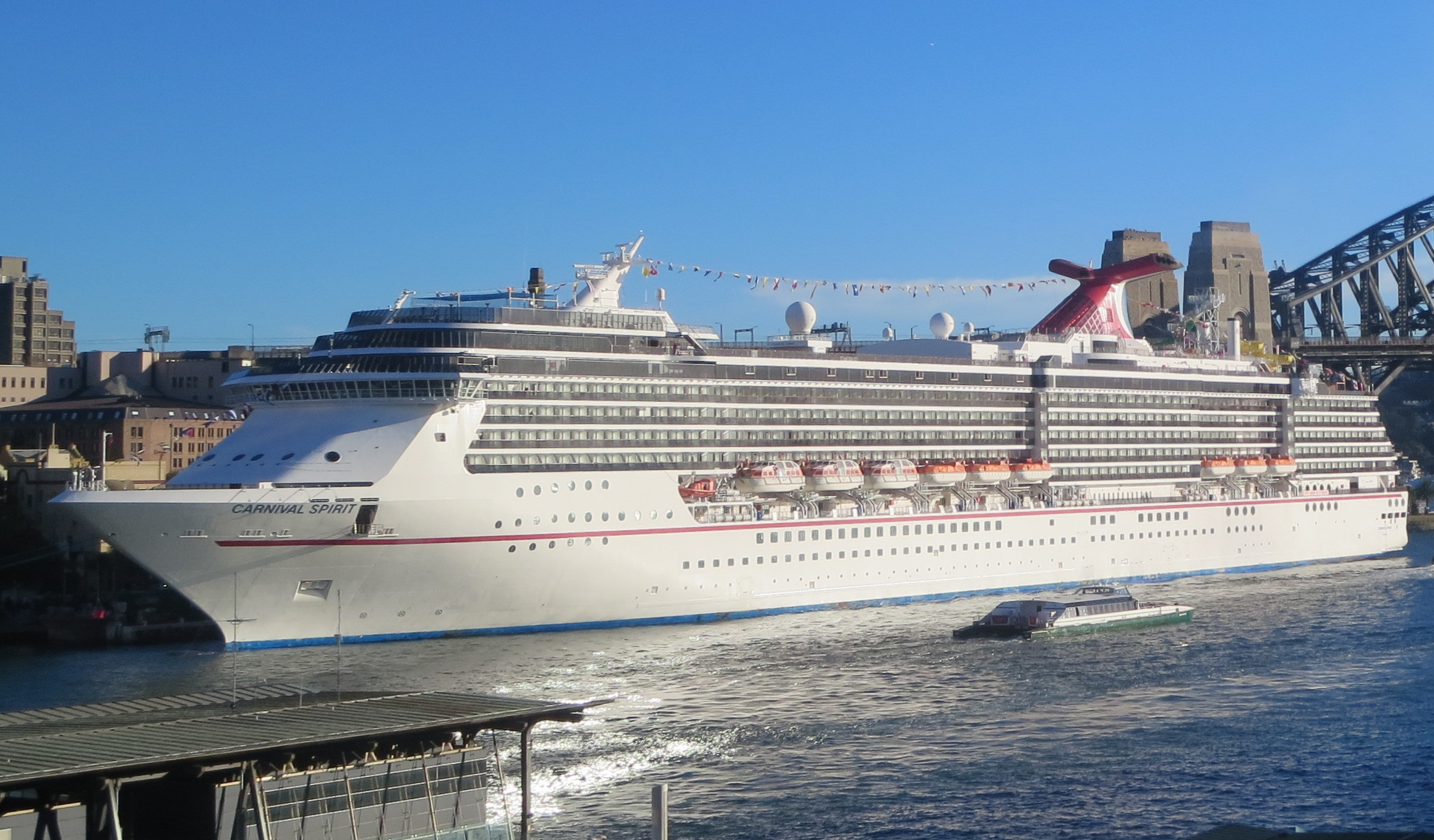
Carnival Spirit docked at Sydney in Australia on 27 May 2014

In May 2016, Carnival announced the ship would sail seasonally from Shanghai beginning in the Australian winter of 2018, making her the first Carnival ship to be based in China. In late 2016, Carnival subsequently reversed this decision and Carnival Spirit continued to sail from Sydney, and explained the Australian market continued to be strong, which did not make the move economically viable in the long term.

In mid 2018, Carnival announced that Carnival Spirit would become the company's first ship to sail from Brisbane from 2020. However, amid the COVID-19 pandemic and its impact on tourism, she never debuted in Brisbane during the cruise industry's pause in operations. She was also the last Cruise Ship to sail from Sydney in 2020, before the Australian Cruising Shutdown In February 2022, Carnival announced she would be redeployed to Jacksonville, Florida and begin operating four-to-five-day itineraries to the Bahamas on 7 March, replacing voyages originally slated for Carnival Ecstasy. It marked a decade since the ship last operated permanently in North America. She was scheduled to move to Seattle to sail in Alaska in mid 2022 and Caribbean from Miami afterwards from 2022 to 2023, replacing sailings planned for Carnival Freedom and was deployed to begin sailing from Mobile, Alabama in October 2023 following another Alaskan season in mid 2023.

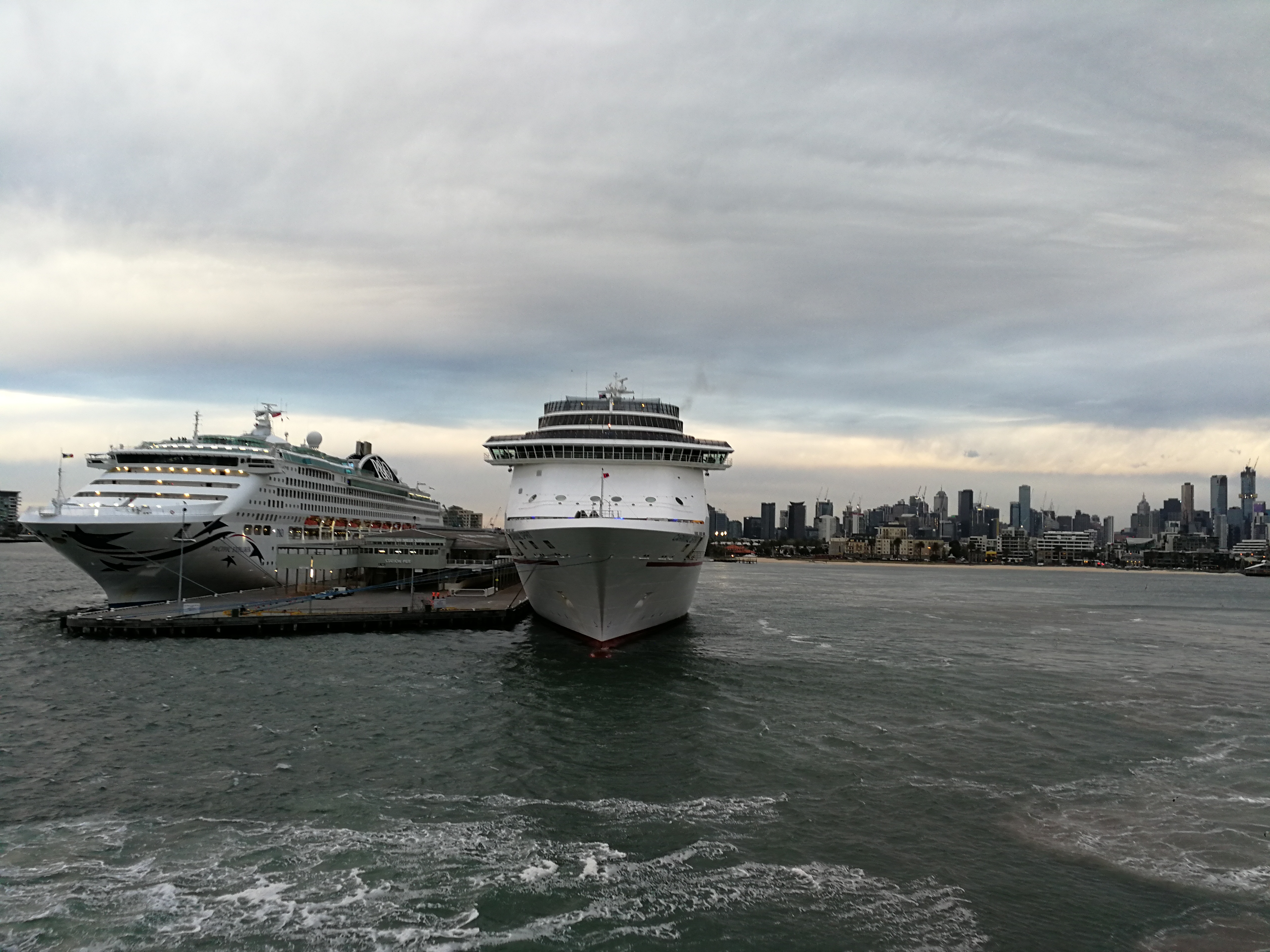
Carnival Spirit is in Station Pier Terminal in Melbourne, Australia with Pacific Explorer on 6 November 2019

For summer 2026, she is sailing Alaska itineraries.
