= Costa Pacifica =

Cruise ship

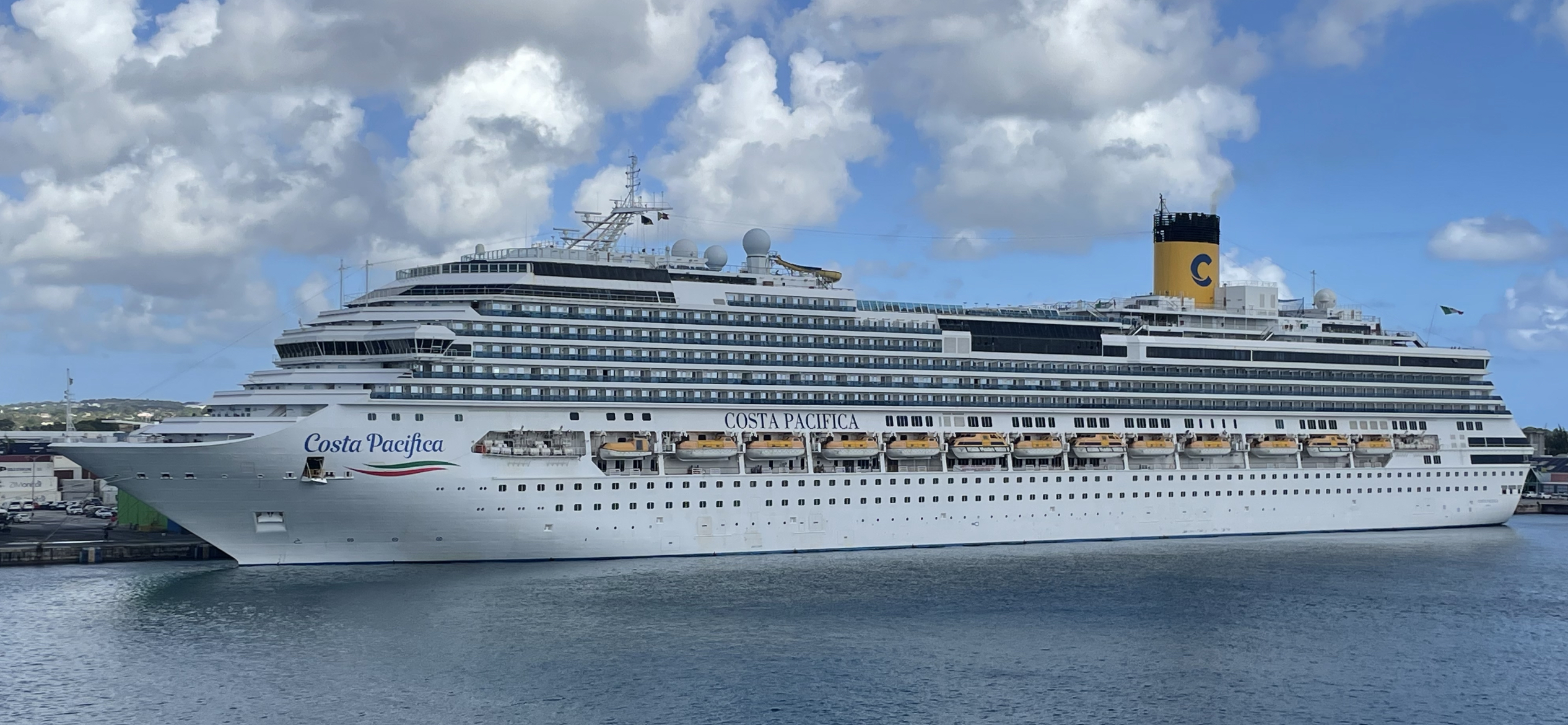
- Costa Pacifica moored at Bridgetown, Barbados

History
- Name: Costa Pacifica
- Owner: Carnival Corporation & plc
- Operator: Costa Crociere
- Port of registry: Genoa, (Italy)
- Ordered: 14 December 2005
- Builder: Fincantieri, Sestri Ponente, Italy
- Yard number: 6148
- Launched: 30 June 2008
- Christened: 5 June 2009
- Acquired: 29 May 2009
- Maiden voyage: 6 June 2009
- In service: 5 June 2009
- Identification: Call sign: ICJA; IMO number: 9378498; MMSI number: 247258100
- Status: In service

General characteristics
- Class & type: Concordia-class cruise ship
- Tonnage: 114,500 GT; 87,300 NT
- Length: 290 m (951 ft 5 in)
- Beam: 36 m (118 ft 1 in)
- Draught: 8.2 m (26 ft 11 in)
- Depth: 19.77 m (64 ft 10 in)
- Decks: 14 passenger decks; 17 total
- Deck clearance: 11.57 m (38 ft 0 in)
- Installed power: 6 × Wärtsilä 12V46, 12,600 kW (16,900 hp) each
- Propulsion: Diesel-electric
- Speed: 21.5 knots (39.8 km/h; 24.7 mph) (cruise); 23 knots (43 km/h; 26 mph) (maximum)
- Capacity: 3,780 passengers
- Crew: 1,100

Costa Pacifica is a Concordia-class cruise ship for Costa Crociere. She was handed over to Costa Crociere on 29 May 2009. Her sister ships, Costa Concordia and Costa Serena, were launched in 2006 and in 2007, with Costa Favolosa and Costa Fascinosa launched in 2011 and 2012 respectively.

== Concept and construction ==
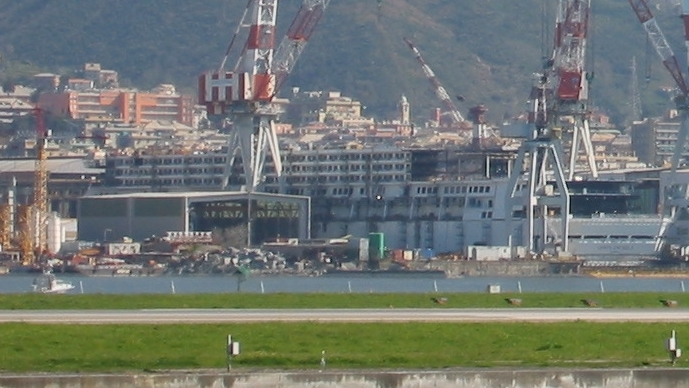
Costa Pacifica under construction at the Fincantieri shipyards in Sestri Ponente on 29 March 2008

Costa Pacifica is the third ship of the Concordia class, preceded by her sister ships Costa Concordia and Costa Serena and followed by Costa Favolosa and Costa Fascinosa in 2011 and 2012, all part of the expansion program of Costa which entailed an investment of 2.4 billion Euros, and was the largest fleet expansion program in the world.

Costa Pacifica was ordered on 14 December 2005, by Carnival Corporation, the parent company of Costa Crociere.

The bow section of Costa Pacifica was built at the Fincantieri Palermo shipyard and was launched on 24 July 2007. The section was then towed to Fincantieri's Sestri Ponente in August 2007 for further work, which also marked the announcement of the ship's name. She was launched at Fincantieri's Sestri Ponente shipyard on 30 June 2008. She returned to Sestri Ponente from her sea trials on 30 March 2009, for the fitting-out process. Almost 3,000 workers helped in the construction of Costa Pacifica.

She was later christened at Genoa, Italy, on 5 June 2009, in a dual christening ceremony, together with Costa Luminosa.

== Amenities ==
Costa Pacifica has 1,504 passenger cabins of various sizes. There are five dining areas, thirteen bars, four swimming pools, various water and health related facilities and a theater. Costa Pacifica is also the first cruise ship to have an onboard recording studio.

== Operational history ==
The maiden voyage of Costa Pacifica was on 6 June 2009, an eight-day cruise and departed in Savona, with a special 48-hour layover in Palma de Mallorca, Spain. In the entire 2009 summer season, Costa Pacifica offered seven day cruises in the Western Mediterranean, with calls at Rome, Savona, Marseille, Barcelona, Palma de Mallorca, Tunis, Malta, and Palermo.

During the 2009–2010 winter season, Costa Pacifica departed from Rome and Savona, offering 10- and 11-day cruises to Egypt, Israel, and Turkey. In the summer 2010 cruise season, she offered seven-day cruises in the Western Mediterranean, with calls at Rome, Savona, Barcelona, Palma, Tunis, Malta and Catania.

On 11 December 2012 Costa Pacifica struck a piling while maneuvering into dock at the Port of Marseille, France. The incident, blamed on heavy wind, left an 8 m (26 ft) gash was left on her hull above the waterline. Her itinerary was not delayed.
