= Carnival Luminosa =

Cruise ship

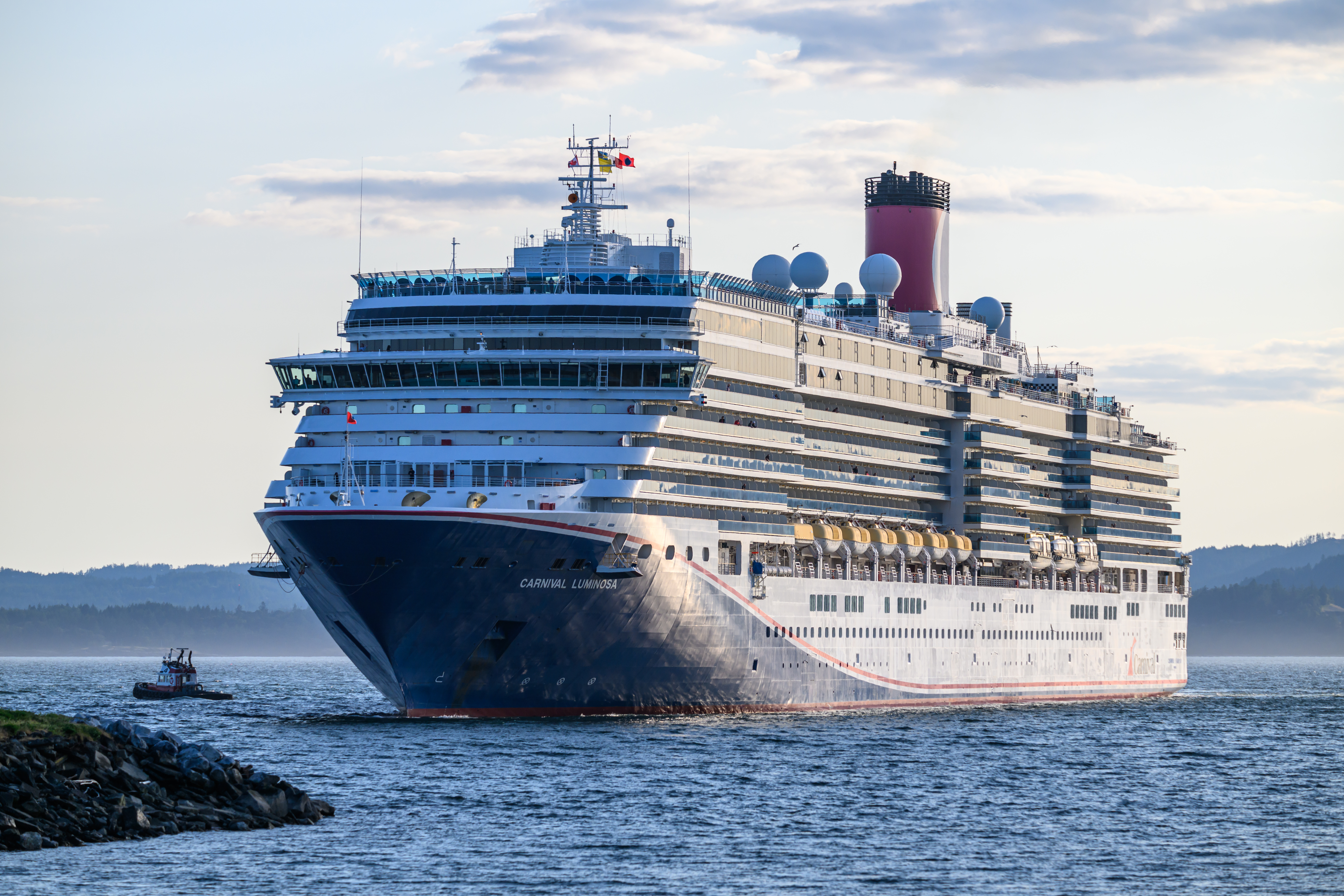
- Carnival Luminosa arriving at Victoria, British Columbia, Canada

History
- Name: Costa Luminosa (2009–2022); Carnival Luminosa (2022–present)
- Owner: Carnival Corporation
- Operator: Costa Cruises (2009–2022); Carnival Cruise Line (2022–present)
- Port of registry: Genoa, (Italy) (2009–2022); Nassau, (The Bahamas) (2022–present)
- Ordered: 12 June 2006
- Builder: Fincantieri, Marghera, Italy
- Yard number: 6155
- Laid down: 10 October 2007
- Launched: 30 June 2008
- Christened: 5 June 2009
- In service: 2009–present
- Identification: Call sign: C6GB6; IMO number: 9398905; MMSI number: 311001201
- Status: Ship in active service

General characteristics
- Class & type: Vista -Spirit-class cruise ships
- Tonnage: 92,600 GT; 59,640 NT; 7,600 DWT
- Length: 293.5 m (962 ft 11 in)
- Beam: 32.3 m (106 ft 0 in)
- Draught: 8 m (26 ft 3 in)
- Decks: 12 (16 total)
- Speed: 23.6 knots (43.7 km/h; 27.2 mph) (maximum)
- Capacity: 2,260 passengers (dual occupancy) 2,826 passengers (maximum occupancy)
- Crew: 1,050

Carnival Luminosa (formerly Costa Luminosa) is a cruise ship operated by Carnival Cruise Line. Originally built as Costa Luminosa, the ship entered service on 5 May 2009. Her design is a hybrid, using elements of Spirit and Vista classes. A sister ship, Costa Deliziosa, was launched in February 2010 and is based on the same design. Costa Luminosa departed Civitavecchia, Italy, on 3 June 2009, on her 13-night maiden voyage, with ports of call in Savona, Saint-Tropez, Barcelona, Lisbon, Le Havre, and Amsterdam.

On 14 June 2022, it was announced that Costa Luminosa would be transferred to the fleet of Carnival Cruise Line, receiving the name Carnival Luminosa. She began sailing for Carnival in November 2022.

== Design and description ==
Costa Luminosa is the thirteenth ship of Costa Cruises, part of their five-ship expansion program, which includes Costa Pacifica, Costa Deliziosa, Costa Favolosa, and Costa Fascinosa. Costa Luminosa and her sister ship, Costa Deliziosa have a gross tonnage of 92,700 each and are 292 metres (958 ft 0 in) long. Costa Luminosa and Costa Deliziosa pioneered in the introduction of a new vessel design, which is a hybrid; using design elements of the Spirit and Vista-class cruise ships.

The ship has 1,130 cabins, four dining areas, a theatre, a cinema and other passenger facilities.

== Construction and career ==
=== Costa Luminosa ===
Costa Luminosa and her sister ship, Costa Deliziosa were ordered from the Fincantieri Marghera shipyard on 12 June 2006. The keel of Costa Luminosa was laid on 10 October 2007 in the Fincantieri Marghera shipyard at Venice. She floated out of drydock on 30 June 2008 and completed her sea trials on 30 March 2009. After 18 months, the ship was handed over to Costa Cruises on 1 May 2009.

The christenings of Costa Luminosa, and the Concordia-class Costa Pacifica were held in Genoa on 5 June 2009. It was the first time that two cruise ships were simultaneously christened in Italy. The dual christening ceremony set a then Guinness World record in the category, "Most ships inaugurated in one day by one company". The two ships also launched simultaneously in their shipyard on 5 June 2008; Costa Luminosa in Marghera and Costa Pacifica in Sestri Ponente.

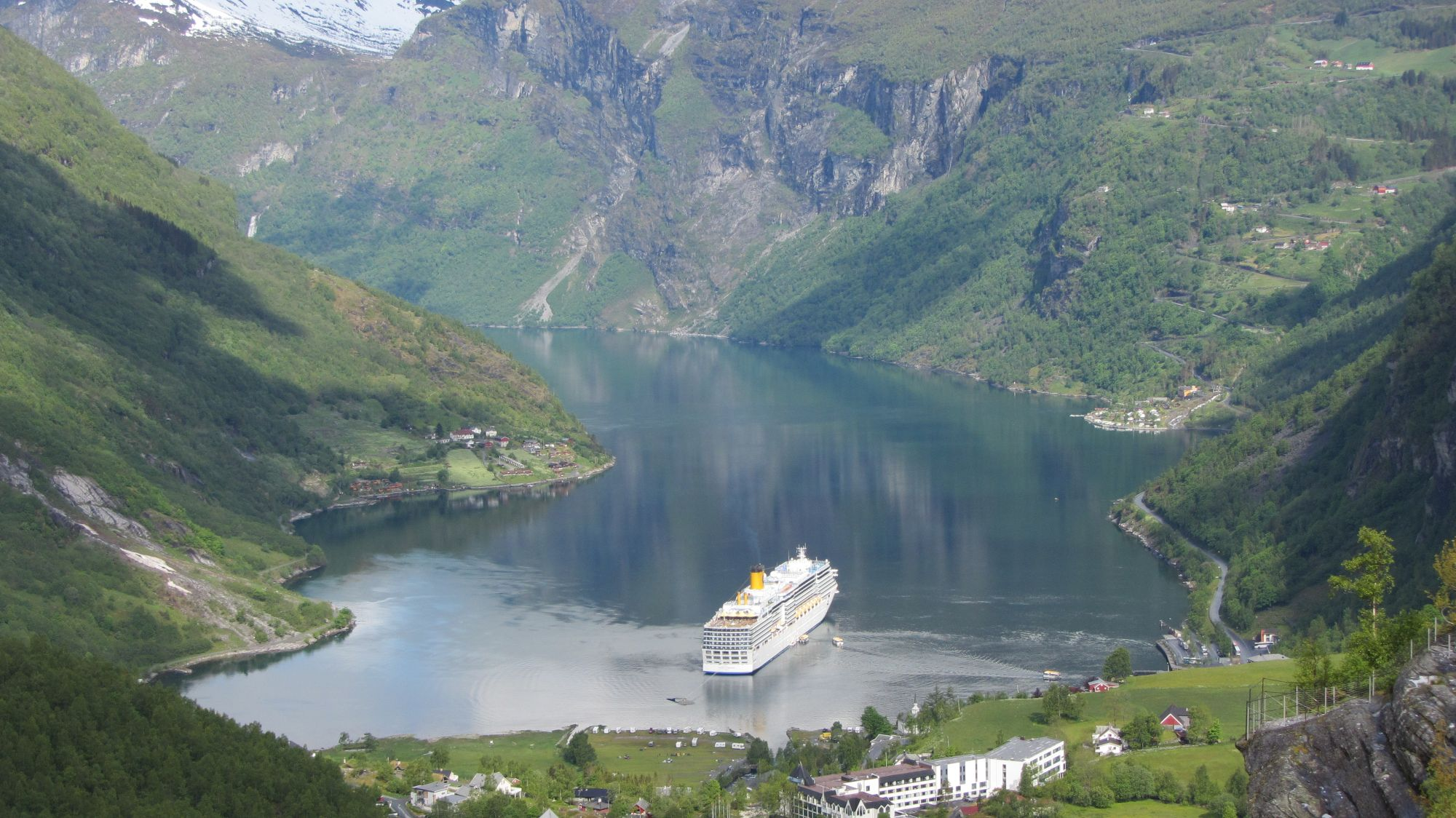
Costa Luminosa in Geirangerfjord

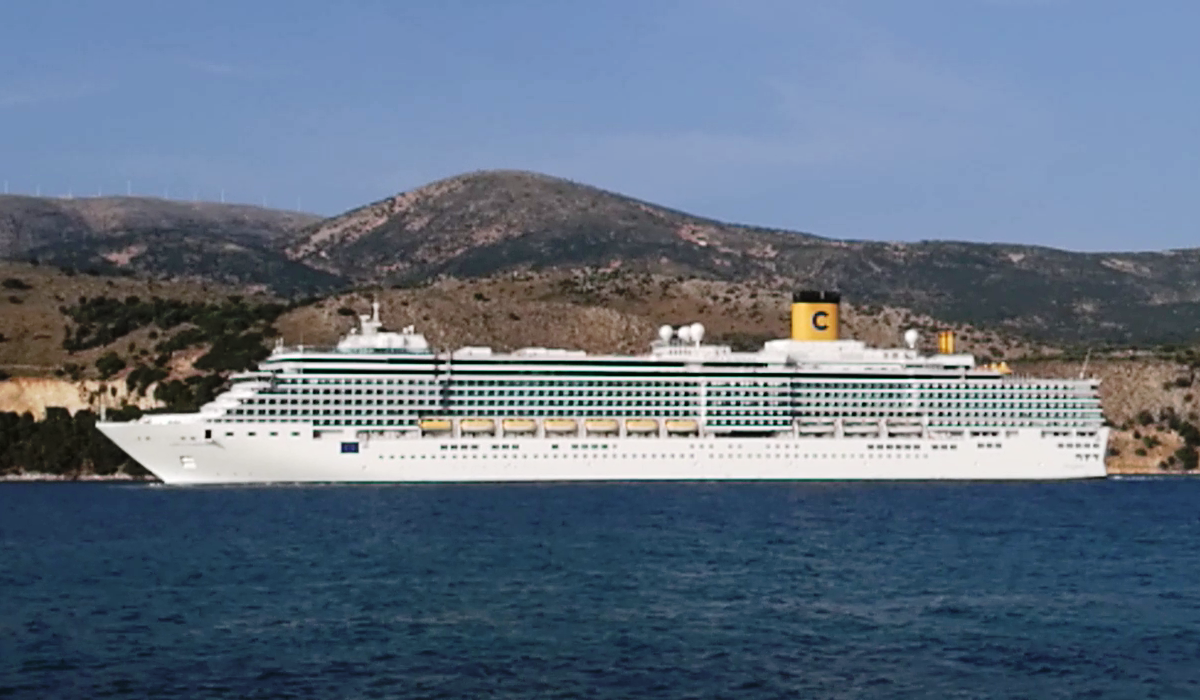
Costa Luminosa in the Gulf of Argostoli, Greece

Costa Luminosa made her first on 5 May 2009, a 10-day cruise in the Eastern Mediterranean, departing Venice, with ports of call at Istanbul, Bari, Olympia, Rhodes, Smyrna, Mykonos, and Athens. It was followed by mini cruises in Eastern Mediterranean, again departing Venice on 15 May 2009. Her second was on 19 May 2009. In the summer of 2009, the ship offered 11 and 14-day cruises at the Baltic capitals, Norwegian fjords and the North Cape.

During the 2009–2010 winter season, the ship operated in Dubai, offering seven-day cruises in the Persian Gulf with calls at Dubai, Muscat, Fujairah, Abu Dhabi, and Bahrain. After the political problems in Bahrain, the company changed the itinerary removing Bahrain.

Despite claims of sustainable practices by both Costa Cruises and its parent company Carnival, Sveriges Television reported in 2015 that Costa Luminosa dumped the toilet waste of its 3,200 passengers and crew in the sea, instead of taking use of harbour facilities, often provided free of charge by Baltic ports. The report calculated that more than 5,000,000 litres (1,100,000 imp gal; 1,300,000 US gal) of waste was dumped during a single cruise in the Baltic Sea. The report did not suggest that the marine pollution regulations MARPOL 73/78 were breached.

From 2017 every summer she sails on seven-night cruises to the Greek Islands. During the winter period Costa Luminosa goes on seven-night cruises in the Caribbean.

==== Coronavirus pandemic ====
On 29 February 2020, a 68-year-old Italian man in critical condition was transferred from Costa Luminosa to a hospital in the Cayman Islands due to heart issues. On 12 March 2020, the Health Services Authority of the Cayman Islands announced that the man was their first confirmed coronavirus case. His death was announced two days later.

On 5 March 2020 the vessel left Fort Lauderdale for a transatlantic cruise. Two people disembarked with symptoms of the coronavirus in Puerto Rico. Subsequently, on 13 March 2020, it was confirmed to be due to COVID-19 – the first known cases in Puerto Rico. One of the two persons died several days later. Because of the virus outbreak several sick passengers were left at Tenerife and passengers were placed under quarantine in their rooms. The ship was not allowed to dock in Spain. It docked at Marseille, France, discharging sick passengers who flew home distributing the virus, and went to Savona where the rest of the passengers were disembarked on 23 March, many of them sick. After the disembarkation at Marseille, French authorities confirmed 36 people with COVID-19 infection. On 21 March local news in Puerto Rico reported the death of the quarantined Italian woman. On 7 April, a Miami lawyer filed a lawsuit against Costa Cruises over mishandling and allowing passengers to sail aboard Costa Luminosa despite having flu-like symptoms.

She spent her final season for Costa sailing seven-night cruises to the Greek Islands.

=== Transfer to Carnival Cruise Line ===
On 14 June 2022 it was announced that Costa Luminosa would be transferred to the fleet of Carnival Cruise Line in September 2022, receiving the name Carnival Luminosa. On 8 September 2022 Costa Luminosa was officially handed over to Carnival Cruise Line. After a refit, the ship sailed to Brisbane, Australia to begin voyages that started on 6 November. The ship has since spent the southern-hemisphere summer months in Australia in 2023 and 2024.
