= MS Island Princess (2002) =

Cruise ship

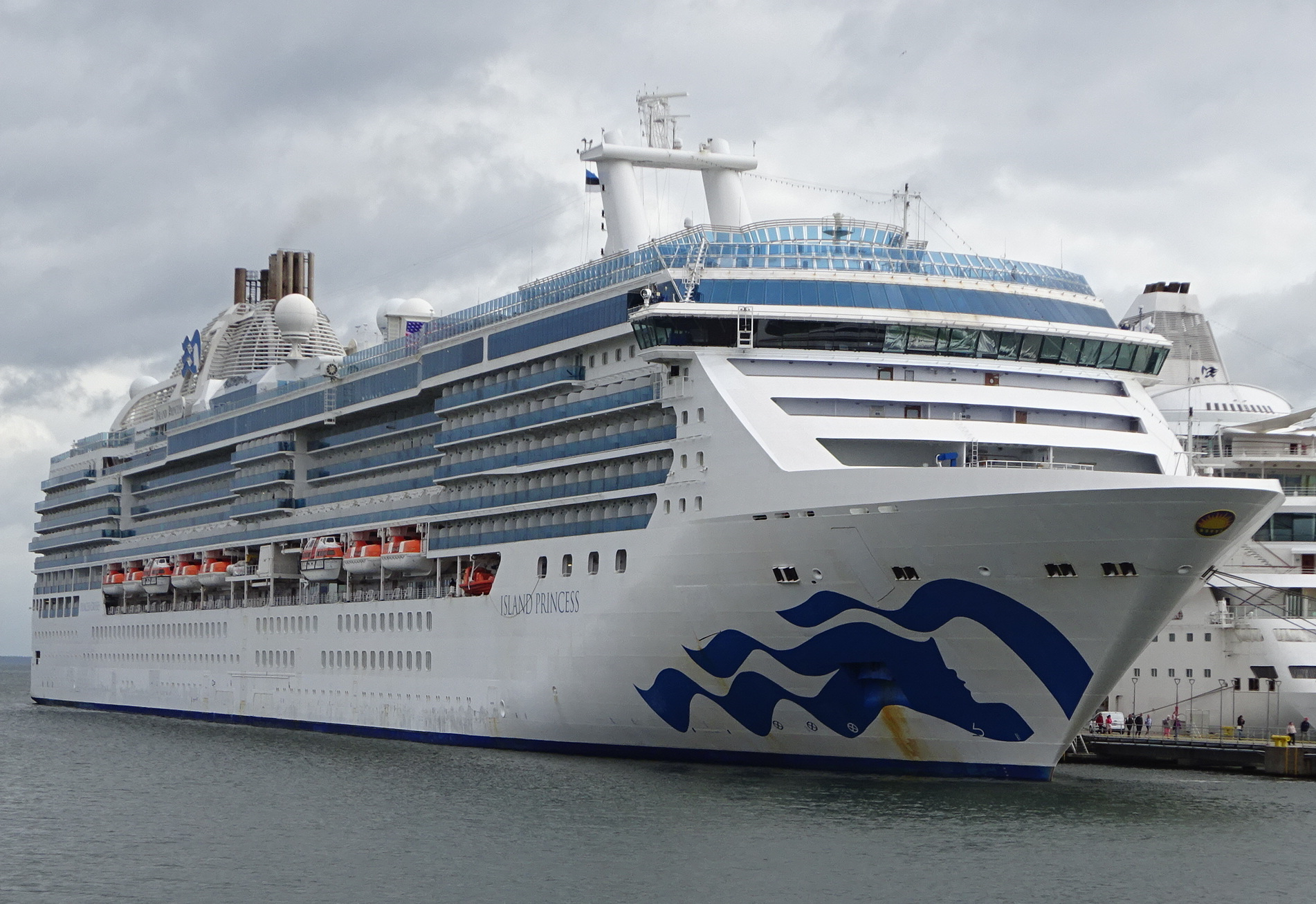
- Island Princess in Tallinn, 2023

History

Bermuda
- Name: Island Princess
- Owner: Carnival Corporation & plc
- Operator: Princess Cruises
- Port of registry: Hamilton, Bermuda
- Ordered: 1999
- Builder: Chantiers de l'Atlantique
- Cost: US$330 million
- Laid down: 2001
- Launched: 2 July 2002
- Christened: 11 July 2003
- Completed: 18 June 2003
- Maiden voyage: 12 July 2003
- In service: 12 July 2003
- Identification: IMO number: 9230402; MMSI number: 310384000; Callsign: ZCDG4
- Status: In service

General characteristics
- Class & type: Coral-class cruise ship
- Tonnage: 91,627 GT
- Length: 294 m (964 ft)
- Beam: 32 m (106 ft) (waterline); 37 m (122 ft) (bridge wings)
- Height: 62 m (204 ft)
- Draught: 7.9 m (26 ft)
- Decks: 16 (12 for passengers)
- Installed power: Two Wärtsilä 16V46C diesel engines; General Electric LM2500+ gas turbine
- Propulsion: Combined diesel-electric and gas (CODLAG); Two shafts; fixed pitch propellers
- Speed: 21 knots (39 km/h; 24 mph)
- Capacity: 2,214 (double occupancy) passengers
- Crew: 900

Island Princess is a Coral-class cruise ship for the Princess Cruises line. She is the sister ship to Coral Princess and together they are the only Panamax ships in Princess's fleet. She was constructed at Chantiers de l'Atlantique, France.

== Service history ==
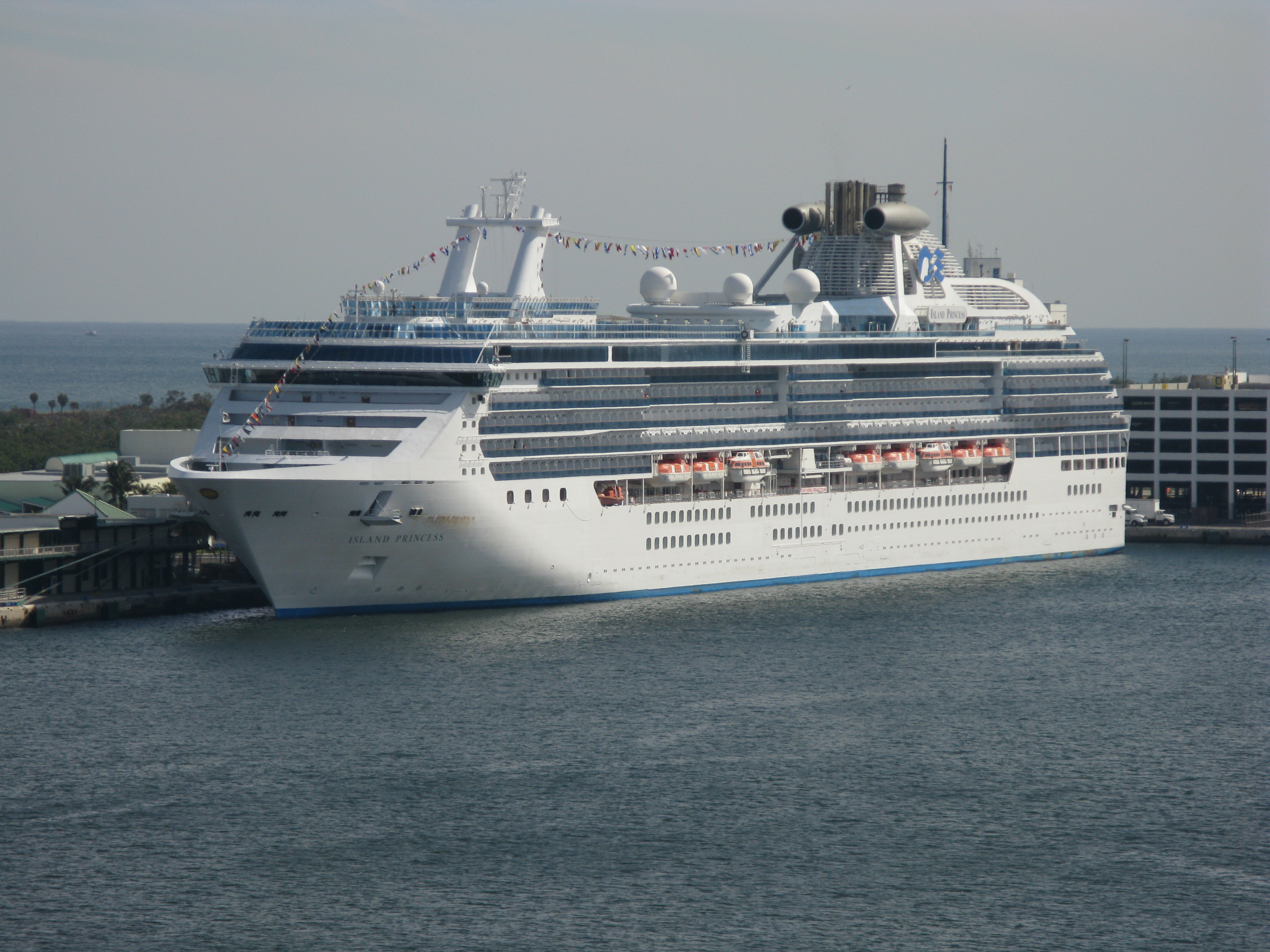
Island Princess in her original pre-refit configuration

The Island Princess was the second of the Coral-class ships constructed at Chantiers de l'Atlantique, France. This is the second ship to bear the name, after the first Island Princess of 1972.

The ship debuted in 2003, and was named by Olympic gold medalist Jamie Salé and David Pelletier.

Island Princess's main itinerary consists of seven-day Alaskan cruises from Vancouver, British Columbia to Whittier, Alaska during the summer months. During the fall, winter, and spring, Island Princess and her sister ship Coral Princess run 10/14-15 day Panama Canal cruises with stops in Cabo San Lucas, Mexico, San Juan del Sur, Puntarenas, Costa Rica, Cartagena, Colombia, and Oranjestad, Aruba.

The ship has had outbreaks of community-spread illnesses. Norovirus hit the ship in March 2006 (72 passengers, 16 crew), October 2006 (109 passengers, 11 crew), January 2007 (179 passengers, 37 crew), January 2018 (71 passengers, 7 crew), February 2019 (101 passengers, 9 crew), e. coli and Shigella in April 2009 (100 passengers, 8 crew), and unknown outbreaks in two May–June 2004 sailings (441 passengers, 68 crew).

In 2015 Island Princess sailed on cruises for the first time in Europe, traveling between Barcelona and Venice.

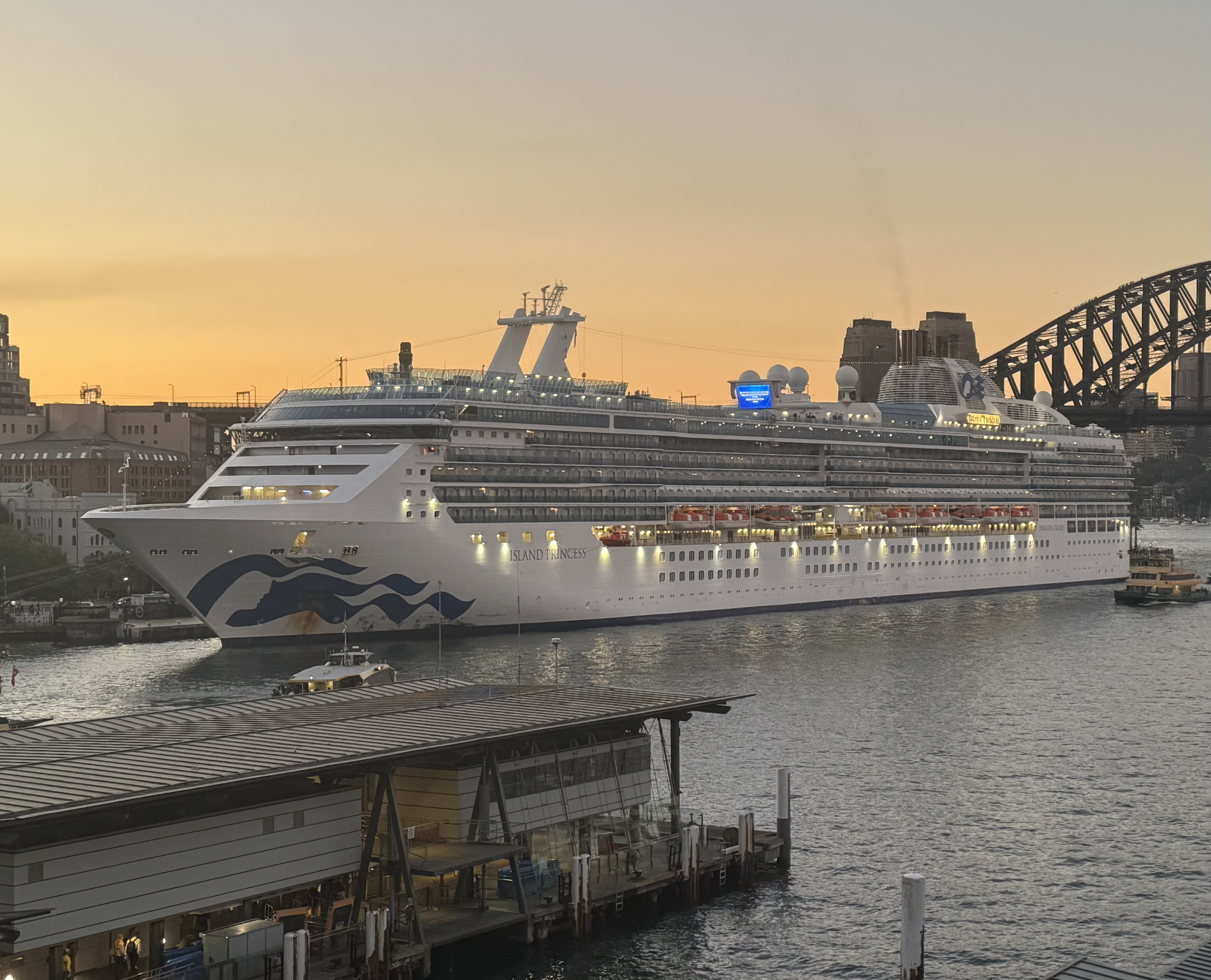
Island Princess docked in Sydney, Australia, 13 April 2026

=== Refit ===
In 2015, the Island Princess was given a major refit that saw the removal of a lounge and the aft part of its promenade to accommodate 121 new staterooms. This increased the ship's capacity from 1,974 to 2,200 double occupancy guests. This altered the ship's profile in addition to the removal of the symbolic gas turbines on the ship's funnels.

The most recent major dry dock occurred in September 2024 at the Fincantieri shipyard in Palermo, Italy. Public Spaces: Received new carpeting in various areas, updates to the atrium, and a rearrangement of the casino with new layouts and slot machines. Dining Changes: The Bayou Steakhouse was converted into a Crown Grill featuring new wood flooring. Accessibility: Added an elevator/ramp access adjustments in the Princess Theater. Staterooms & Maintenance: Included routine hotel upkeep, hull repainting, technical overhauls, and minor updates like new cabin televisions and soft furnishings.

In the 2019/2020 cruise season, Island Princess continued to operate the West Coast cruises.

Island Princess after removal of faux gas turbine cylinders and added aft cabins

As part of the COVID-19 pandemic on cruise ships, the ship repatriated crew members to Asia in April 2020. In May 2020, the summer cruise schedule for the ship was cancelled.
