= Coral Princess =

Cruise ship built in 2002

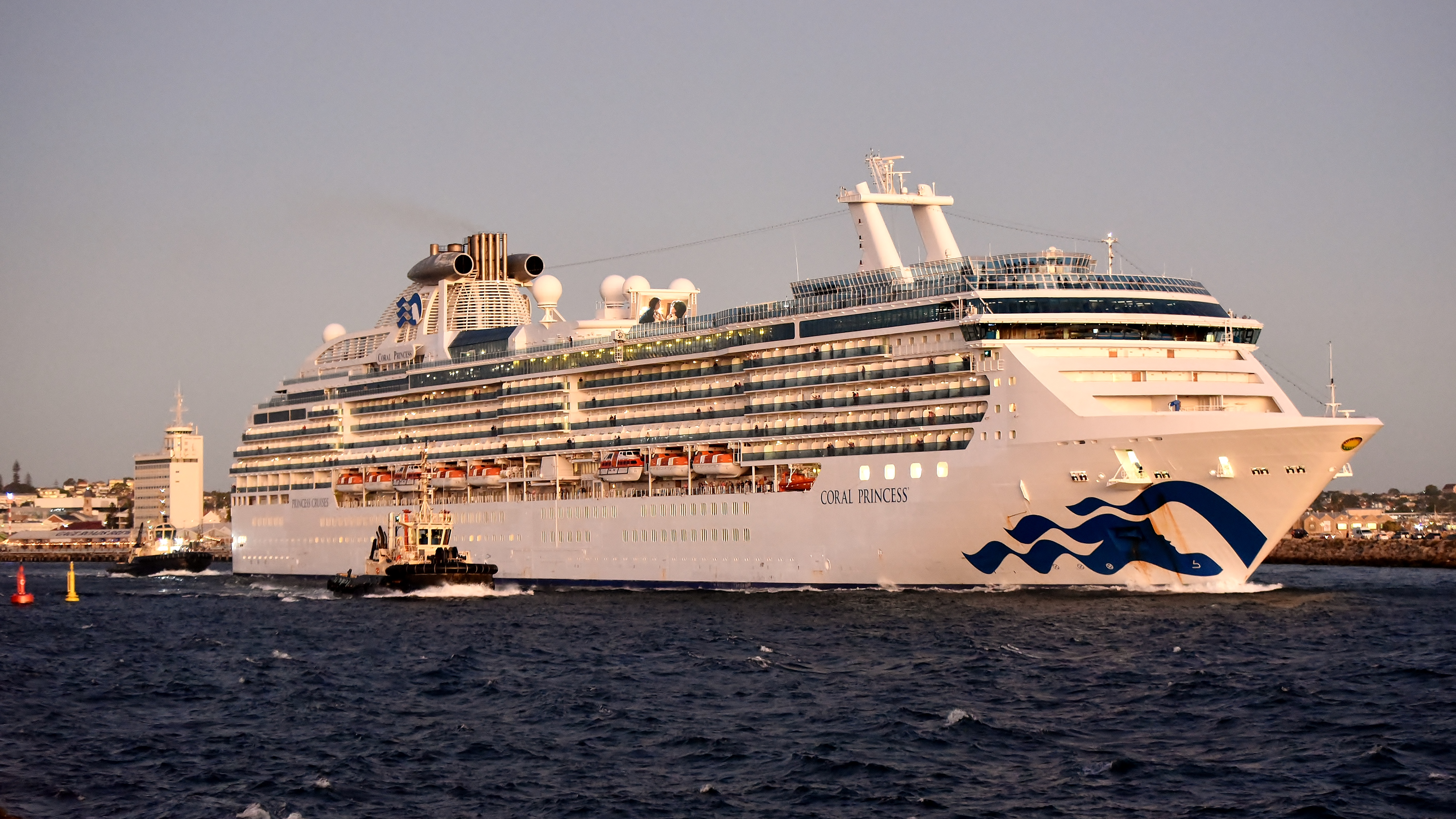
- Coral Princess leaving Fremantle in 2023

History

Bermuda
- Name: Coral Princess
- Owner: Carnival Corporation
- Operator: Princess Cruises
- Port of registry: Hamilton, Bermuda
- Ordered: 2000
- Builder: Chantiers de l'Atlantique
- Cost: US$360 million
- Yard number: No.C32
- Laid down: 2000
- Launched: 2 March 2002
- Sponsored by: Mireya Moscoso
- Christened: 18 January 2003
- Completed: December 2002
- Maiden voyage: 3 January 2003
- In service: 3 January 2003
- Identification: IMO number: 9229659; MMSI number: 310376000; Callsign: ZCDF4
- Status: In service

General characteristics
- Class & type: Coral-class cruise ship
- Tonnage: 91,627 GT
- Length: 294 m (964 ft)
- Beam: 32 m (106 ft) (waterline); 37 m (122 ft) (bridge wings)
- Height: 62 m (204 ft)
- Draft: 8.2 m (27 ft)
- Decks: 16
- Installed power: Two Wärtsilä 16V46C diesel engines; General Electric LM2500+ gas turbine
- Propulsion: [Diesel-electric]; Two shafts; fixed pitch propellers
- Speed: 22 knots (41 km/h; 25 mph)
- Capacity: 1,970 passengers
- Crew: 900

Coral Princess is a Coral-class cruise ship operated by Princess Cruises. The Panamax vessel, along with sister ship Island Princess, was debuted in 2003.

== Design and construction ==
The Coral Princess is the first of two in the Panamax series Coral-Class. The ship was ordered by P&O Princess Cruises in December 1999 to be constructed at Chantiers de l'Atlantique shipyard in France. This was the first return to a French shipyard by Princess Cruises since the Sitmar Cruises ordered Star Princess in the 1980s.

The ship is powered by a General Electric LM2500 25,000 kW gas turbine located in the funnel along with two 16,200 kW diesel-alternators fitted in the main machinery room using Wärtsilä prime movers. The turbine and diesel engines drive three alternators that supply power to two main switchboards and twin 20,000 kW Alstom variable speed propulsion motors. This propulsion system, known as the EnviroEngine, is the first in the cruise industry to fully utilize this new system. It is also the first in the Princess fleet to use a gas-turbine power generator. The placement of the turbo engine in the funnel freed up additional passenger space in the two lower decks allowing it to be utilized for public amenities.

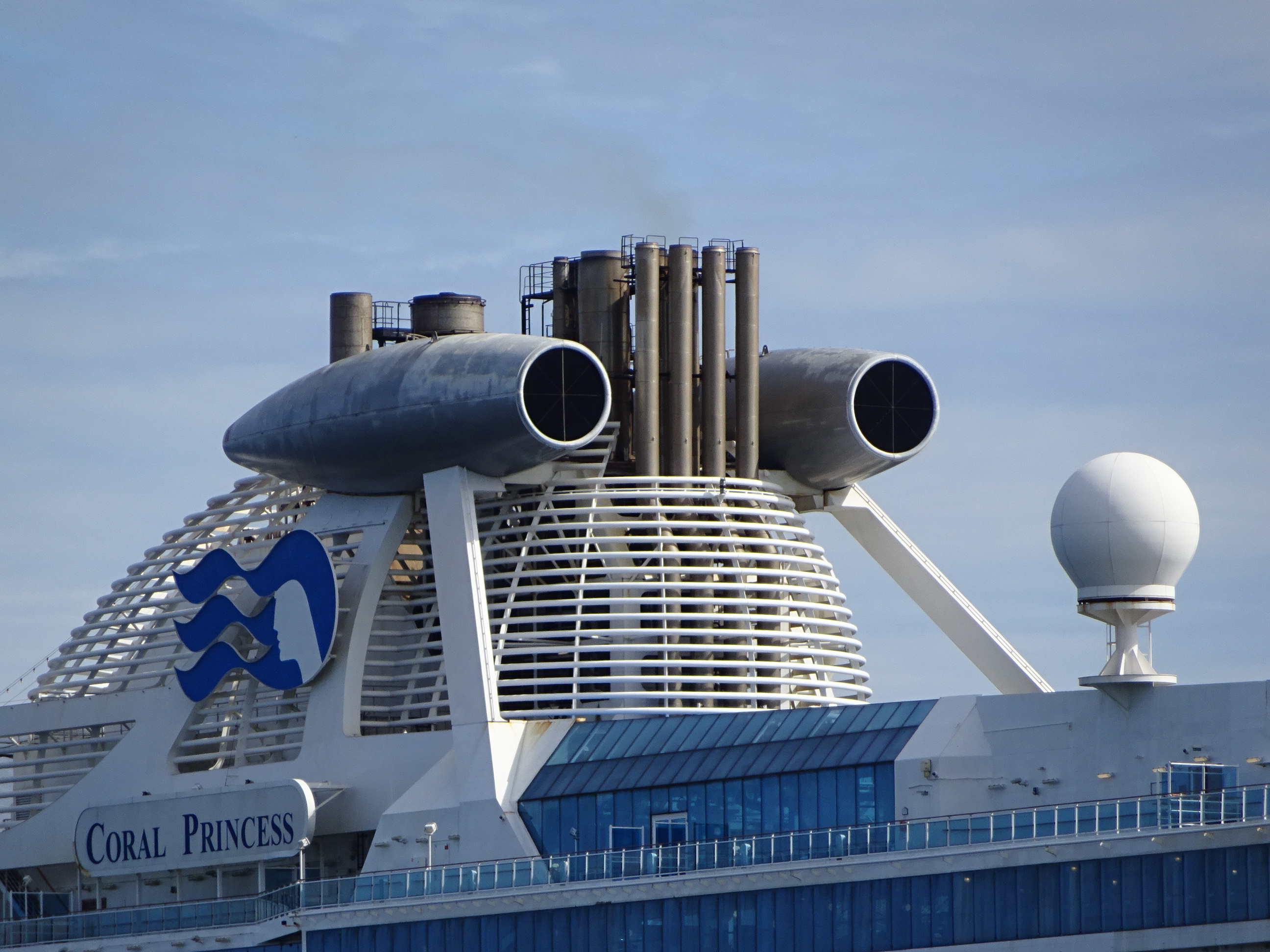
Coral Princess funnel with the symbolic gas turbine cylinders

To represent the gas turbines, the funnel has two cylindrical turbines placed at the top. Although serving no function, the ship was the first to debut the decorative cylinders. This design element is duplicated on the Diamond Princess and Sapphire Princess.

The ship has 1,545 staterooms (1,105 outside/440 inside) and carries 2,000 passenger double occupancy and 895 crew.

The ship was completed in December 2002, and made her maiden voyage in January 2003.

== Service history ==
The Coral Princess would be one of the first Princess ships to debut under the new Carnival Corp ownership. The ship made her maiden voyage on January 17, 2003, christened by Mireya Moscoso, the President of Panama.

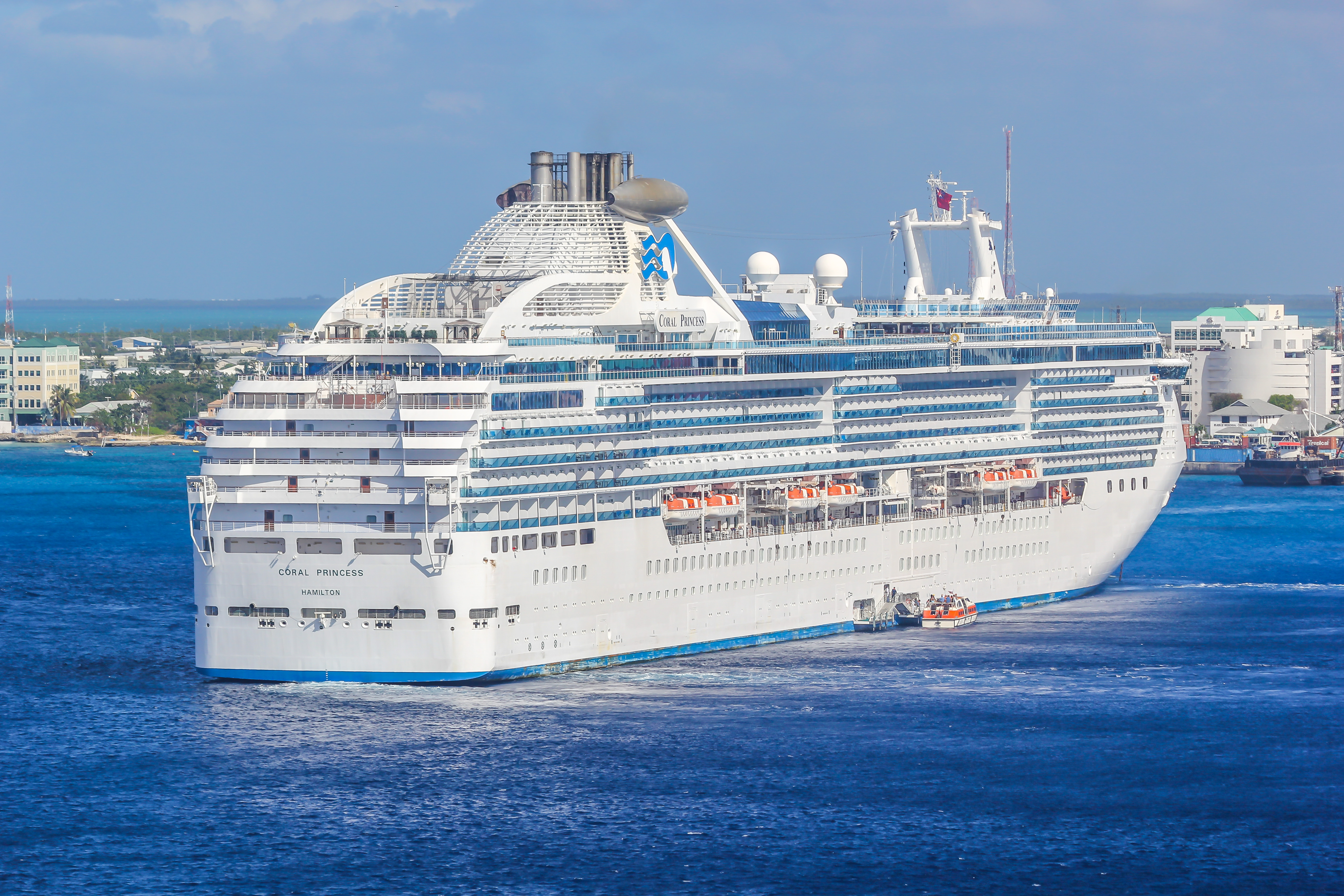
Stern view of Coral Princess in Grand Caymen

On 2 May 2013, Coral Princess suffered a fire when some flammable material in the engineering spaces accidentally ignited in the middle of the night. It was quickly extinguished without anyone onboard being injured; however, minor amounts of smoke were detected by passengers as far up as Deck 8.

Coral Princess experienced an engine fire at approximately 21:30 local time on 15 January 2020 while in the Drake Passage en route to Stanley, Falkland Islands. At the time of the fire, Coral Princess was 4 nautical miles (7.4 km; 4.6 mi) north of Elephant Island in Antarctica. The ship had just completed a two-day transit of the Antarctic Peninsula when the fire occurred and was contained by the ship's on-board fire detection system; no passengers or crew were injured.

In 2022, the ship was diverted from New Zealand to have the hull cleaned of snails to prevent introducing any foreign species to the New Zealand environment.
