= Carnival Dream =

Cruise ship operated by Carnival Cruise Line

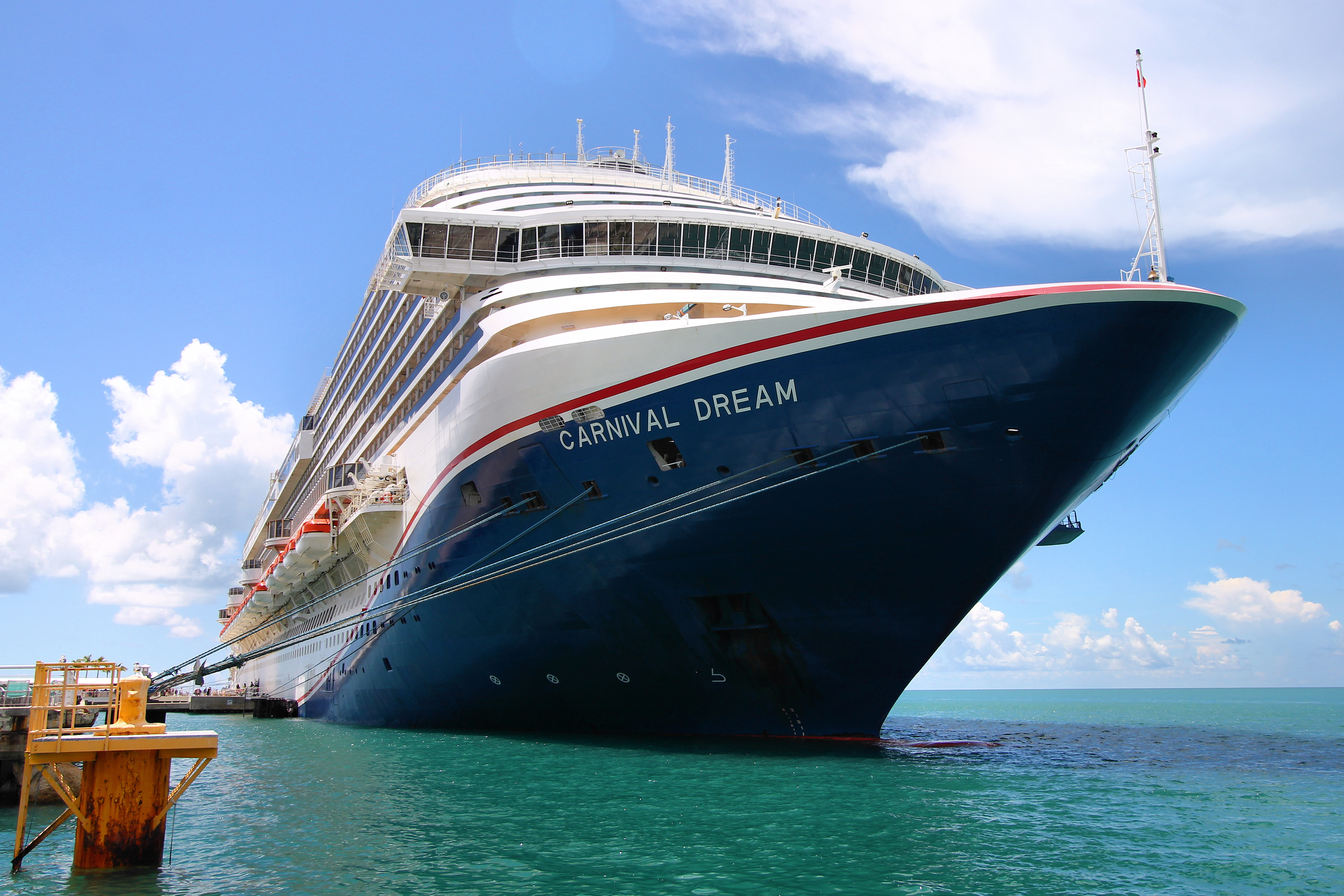
- Carnival Dream docked at Key West in 2022

History

Panama
- Name: Carnival Dream
- Owner: Carnival Corporation
- Operator: Carnival Cruise Line
- Port of registry: Panama City, Panama
- Ordered: January 31, 2006
- Builder: Fincantieri
- Cost: US$741 million
- Yard number: Monfalcone 6151
- Laid down: February 4, 2008
- Launched: October 24, 2008
- Sponsored by: Marcia Gay Harden
- Christened: November 13, 2009
- Acquired: September 12, 2009
- Maiden voyage: September 21, 2009
- In service: 2009–present
- Identification: Call sign: 3ETA7; IMO number: 9378474; MMSI number: 370490000
- Status: In service

General characteristics
- Class & type: Dream-class cruise ship
- Tonnage: 128,250 GT; 112,127 NT; 13,815 DWT
- Length: 306.02 m (1,004 ft 0 in)
- Beam: 37.2 m (122 ft 1 in)
- Decks: 15
- Installed power: 6 × Wärtsilä 12V46; 75,600 kW (101,400 hp) (combined)
- Speed: 22.5 knots (41.7 km/h; 25.9 mph)
- Capacity: 3,646 passengers
- Crew: 1,369

Carnival Dream is a cruise ship operated by Carnival Cruise Line. She is the lead ship of her namesake class, which includes Carnival Magic, Carnival Breeze, and Costa Diadema. Built by Fincantieri at its Monfalcone shipyard in Friuli-Venezia Giulia, northern Italy, she was floated out on October 24, 2008, and christened by Marcia Gay Harden.

At 128,250 GT, Carnival Dream was once the largest Carnival Cruise Ship. It lost this title to Carnival Magic, when she was introduced in 2011.

== Facilities ==
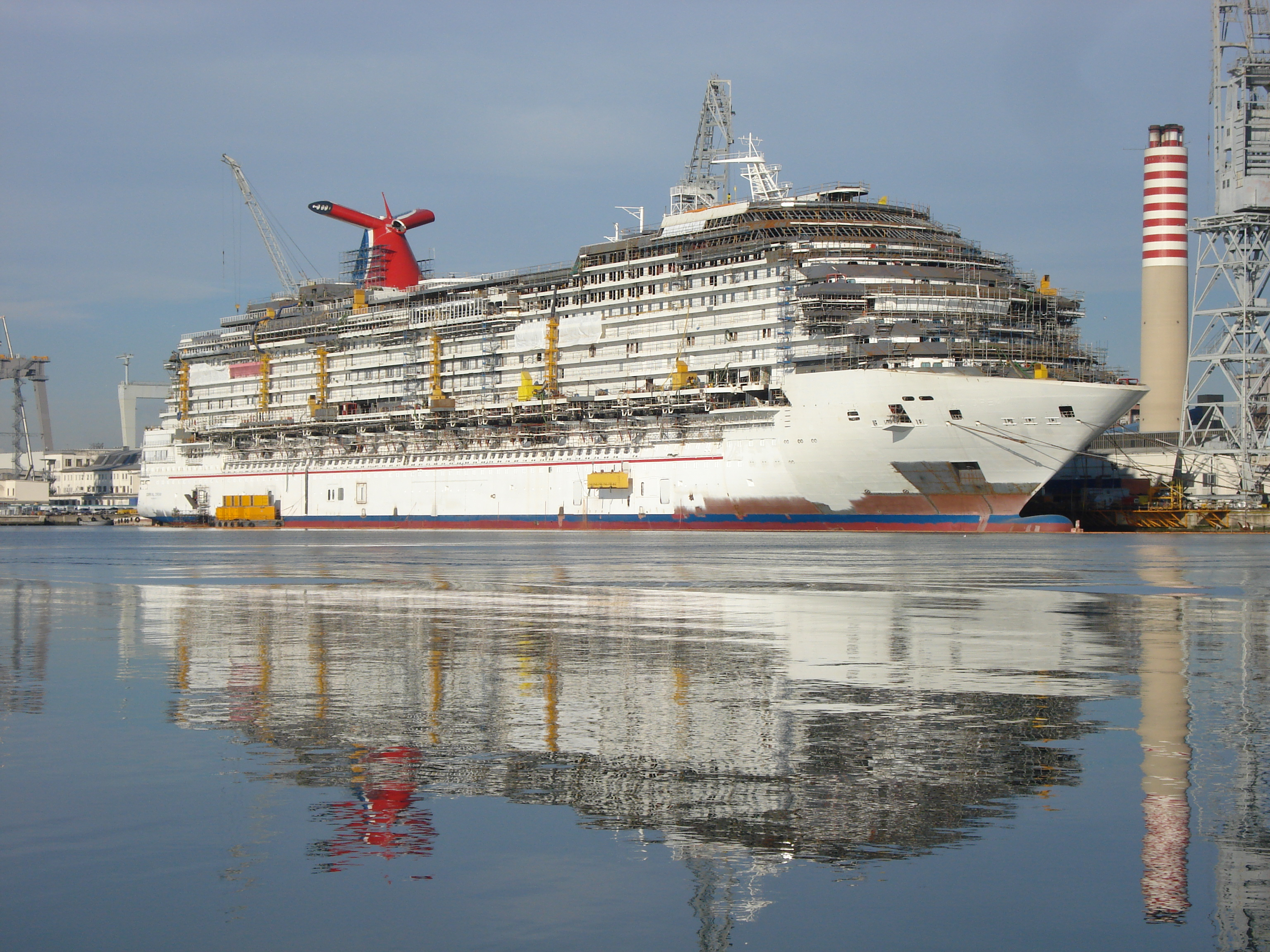
Carnival Dream under construction in 2008

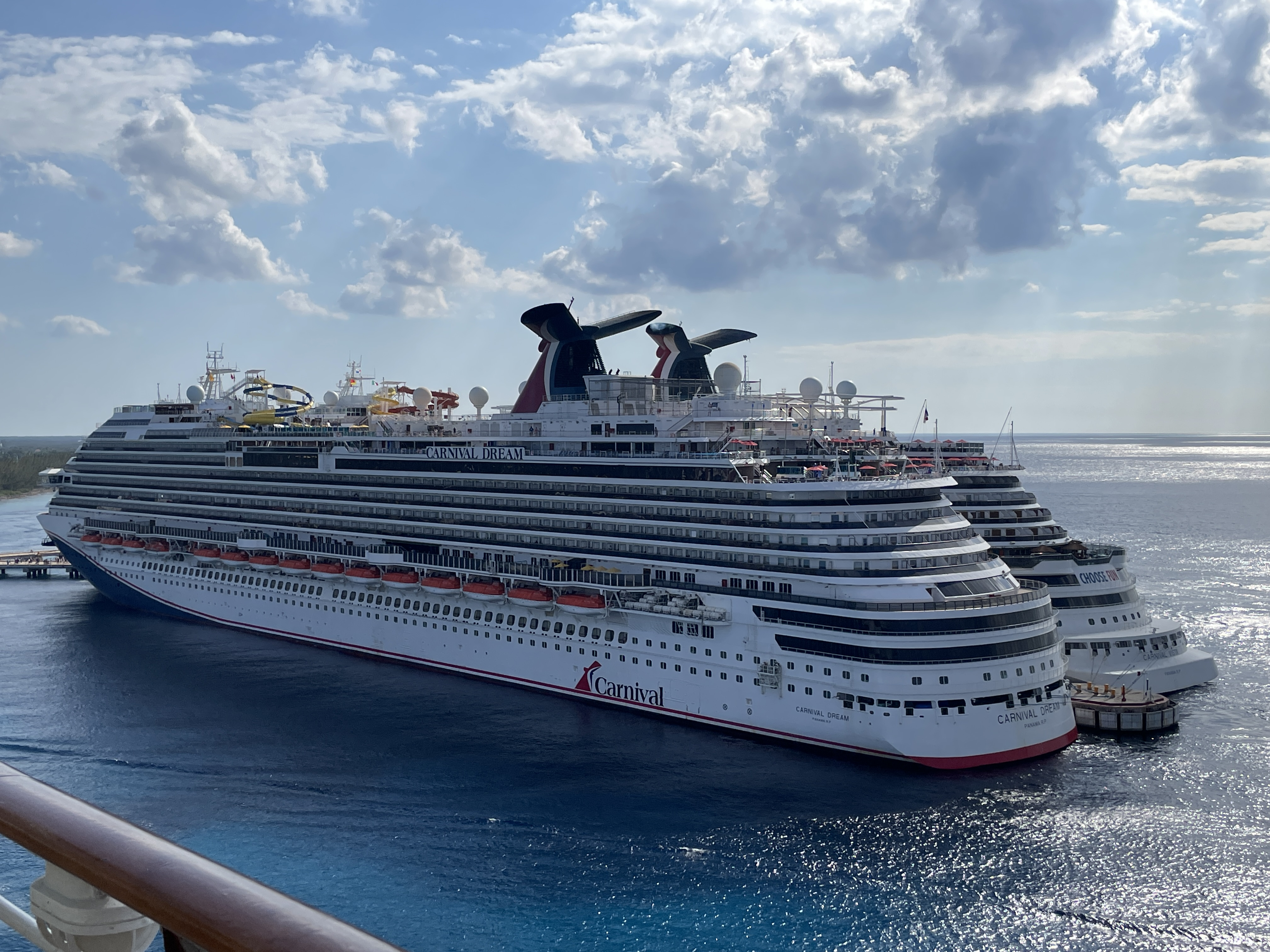
Carnival Dream in March 2023

Carnival Dream not only introduced the Dream class of cruise ships, but influenced Carnival's Vista class of ships. Carnival Dream and her sisters were the largest ships ever built by Fincantieri until the introduction of the Vista-class ships in 2016, which were also built by Fincantieri. The ship was the first in the Carnival fleet to include a water park with multiple slides. She also has an 18-hole miniature golf course and a wide outdoor promenade deck that includes an outdoor café and a whirlpool Jacuzzi in four places along the outside edge of the deck.

== Drydock refurbishment ==
Carnival Dream went into drydock in Freeport, Bahamas in 2017 receiving new carpeting, lighting, and wall coverings and new restaurants. The ship went into drydock in Marseille in 2021 and received the blue/white livery seen on some of the cruise line's other ships.

== History ==
Carnival Dream has been based in several US ports cruising to Caribbean destinations. The ship was based in New Orleans, Louisiana up until late 2019 when she was re-positioned to Galveston, Texas.

In July 2011, Carnival Dream had issues with one of her engines, forcing a change in her travel schedule.

On March 14, 2013, Carnival Dream experienced a back-up generator malfunction while performing regular pre-embarkation testing. No power outages occurred but Carnival Cruise Line decided to stay docked in port at Philipsburg, Sint Maarten. The ship was scheduled to leave port around 5 p.m. ET the day before. The United States Coast Guard said they were notified by Carnival Cruise Lines that Carnival Dream was experiencing problems with her generator. Carnival was paying to fly passengers back to Port Canaveral, via Orlando International Airport, or their home cities and canceled Carnival Dream's March 16, 2013 departure. The ship set sail on her first cruise after the mechanical problems on March 23, 2013.

Michael Moses Ward, also known as Birdie Africa, the only child survivor of the 1985 MOVE bombing, died in September 2013, at the age of 41. His death occurred in a hot tub aboard Carnival Dream while sailing in the Caribbean. Initial reports indicated an accidental drowning. Sources say he may have had a stroke in the hot tub.

On May 3, 2018, a pipe, which was part of the ship's fire suppression system, burst and flooded deck 9. About 50 staterooms were affected by the flood. On December 29, 2018, lifeboat number 28 broke loose from Carnival Dream for unknown reasons and was excessively damaged. Carnival decided to abandon the lifeboat at sea and plans to purchase a new replacement. No one was on board the lifeboat at the time and no injuries were reported.

On October 24, 2019, a few hours after Carnival Dream left Galveston, a man went overboard by jumping off his stateroom balcony. Carnival stated "the ship's command promptly began search and rescue procedures, returned to the area near where the incident occurred and notified the US Coast Guard." After 586 square miles (1,520 km^{2}) covered by the search in 48 hours, the US Coast Guard suspended operations.

On November 19, 2025, Lifeboat 3 fell from its position during an unmanned test of lowering the lifeboat whilst the ship was docked in Cozumel, Mexico. The lifeboat was severely damaged with part of the orange cover remaining attached to its davit latch, and a large split down the centre of its bow but no damage was reported of Carnival Dream's hull nor any reported injuries from crew or passengers.
