= Carnival Cruise Line =

International cruise line

- Type: Wholly owned subsidiary
- Industry: Hospitality, travel, tourism
- Founded: March 11, 1972; 54 years ago
- Founder: Ted Arison
- Headquarters: Doral, Florida, United States
- Area served: Worldwide
- Key people: Christine Duffy, President; Neil Palomba, Chief Operating Officer
- Products: Sea cruises
- Revenue: US$21.6 billion (2023)
- Number of employees: 40,000 (2022)
- Parent: Carnival Corporation & plc
- Website: www.carnival.com
- Footnotes House Flag

Carnival Cruise Line is an international cruise line with headquarters in Doral, Florida. The company is a subsidiary of Carnival Corporation & plc. Its logo is a funnel shaped like a whale's tail, with a red, white, and blue color scheme. This trademark funnel design is built onto the line's ships. Carnival is ranked first on the list of largest cruise lines based on passengers carried annually.

As of March 2025, Carnival Cruise Line operates a fleet of 29 ships with five new ships set to join between 2027 and 2033.

== History ==
Carnival Cruise Line was founded in 1972 by Ted Arison. To finance the venture, Arison turned to his friend Meshulam Riklis, who owned Boston-based American International Travel Service (AITS). Arison and Riklis set up the new company as a subsidiary of AITS. AITS was to market and promote the new venture. In 1974, due to regulatory issues, Riklis sold AITS's interest in the company to Arison for $1, subject to Arison taking over the substantial company debts. The split enabled Arison to enter into new relationships with independent travel agents. He also promoted his cruises to younger people. The format was very successful financially.

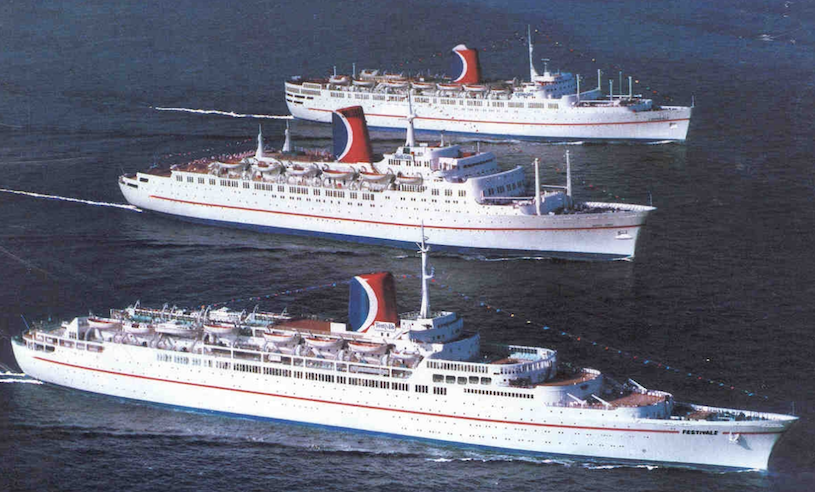
Carnival Cruise Line's fleet in the 1970s, the Carnivale, Mardi Gras, and Festivale

=== 1970s: Early years ===
In 1972, Carnival Cruise Line began sailing from Miami with its first ship, the Mardi Gras, a former transatlantic liner purchased from Canadian Pacific Line. Carnival adapted and evolved the green Canadian Pacific livery for their new logo, changing the colors to red, white and blue as seen today.

In 1975, Carnival acquired another former Canadian Pacific Line ship, renaming it the Carnivale. The success of the two ships led to the acquisition of their third ship in 1978, the TSS Festivale, another former ocean liner. With the success of the three ships, Carnival decided to build new ships to be able to compete with the rival Miami cruise lines.

=== 1980s: First new build ships ===
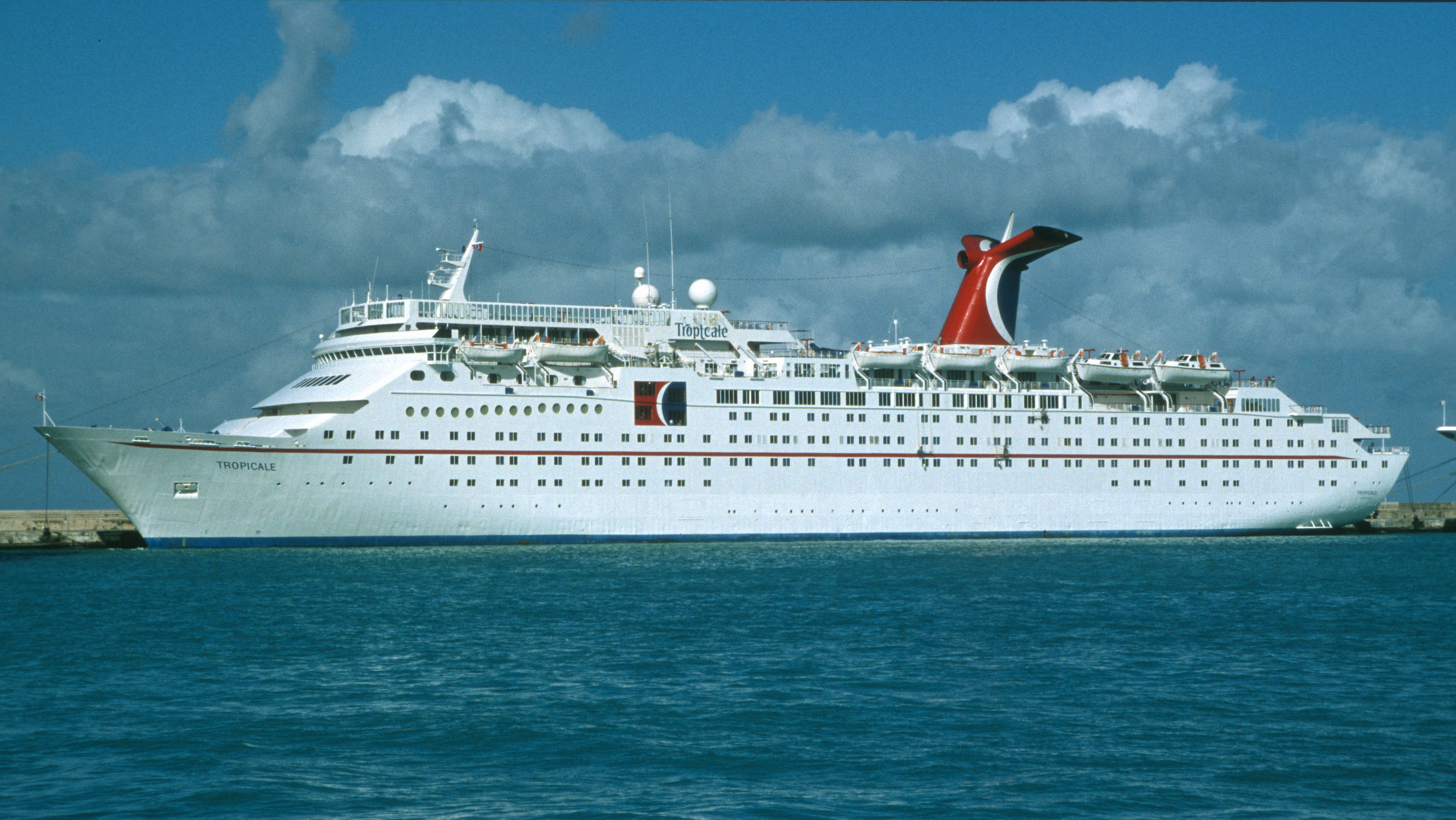
MS Tropicale, Carnival's first purpose-built cruise ship, in Martinique, December 1996

In 1982, Carnival introduced their first purpose-built ship, the Tropicale. This was the first ship on which the iconic winged funnel was introduced, which has since been used on all purpose-built ships in the fleet. It was designed by Joe Farcus, who became a longtime Carnival Cruise Line design collaborator.

In 1984, Carnival introduced a new television marketing campaign, starring Kathie Lee Gifford, who continues to be a longtime collaborator with the line.

Following the success of the Tropicale, and increased competition in Miami with newer ships, Carnival ordered the Holiday in 1985, followed by the Jubilee in 1986 and Celebration in 1987.

=== 1990s: Fleet expansion ===
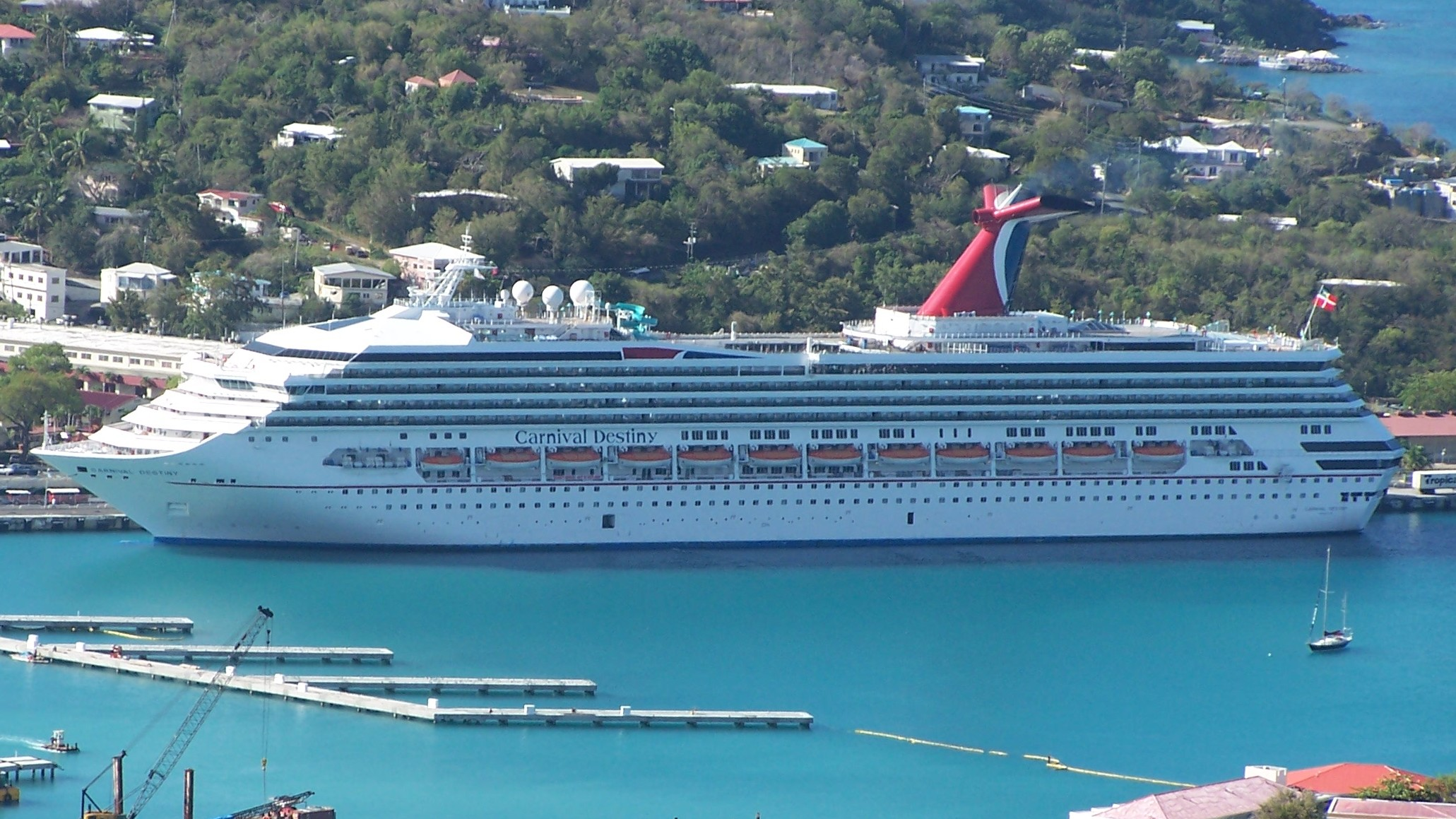
The Destiny-class Carnival Destiny docked in St. Thomas in 2006

Beginning in 1990, Carnival introduced the popular Fantasy class, beginning with the Fantasy, and completed with the eighth in the class Paradise in 1998. When completed, the Fantasy was one of the largest ships at the time and had the largest atrium at sea. After having done design work on all the previous Carnival ships, Joe Farcus continued as the lead designer for the entire class.

In 1993, Carnival began to get rid of their older second-hand tonnage, and sold their first ship, Mardi Gras, after 21 years of service with the line. The Carnivale followed the same year, going to newly created Carnival subsidiary Fiesta Marina Cruises.

In 1996, the new Destiny class was introduced, with the Carnival Destiny. At 101,000 GT, it became the largest passenger ship in the world at the time and first to exceed 100,000 tons. The Destiny-class platform continued to be used in various iterations all the way to the Carnival Splendor in 2008. The same year the veteran ship Festivale, the last of the original second-hand fleet, was retired.

In 1998, the seventh ship in the Fantasy class, the Elation, was the first cruise ship to have the innovative azipod propulsion, used on most new cruise ships today. The Paradise also debuted in 1998, and was the first completely non-smoking cruise when it originally debuted.

=== 2000s: Early modern era ===
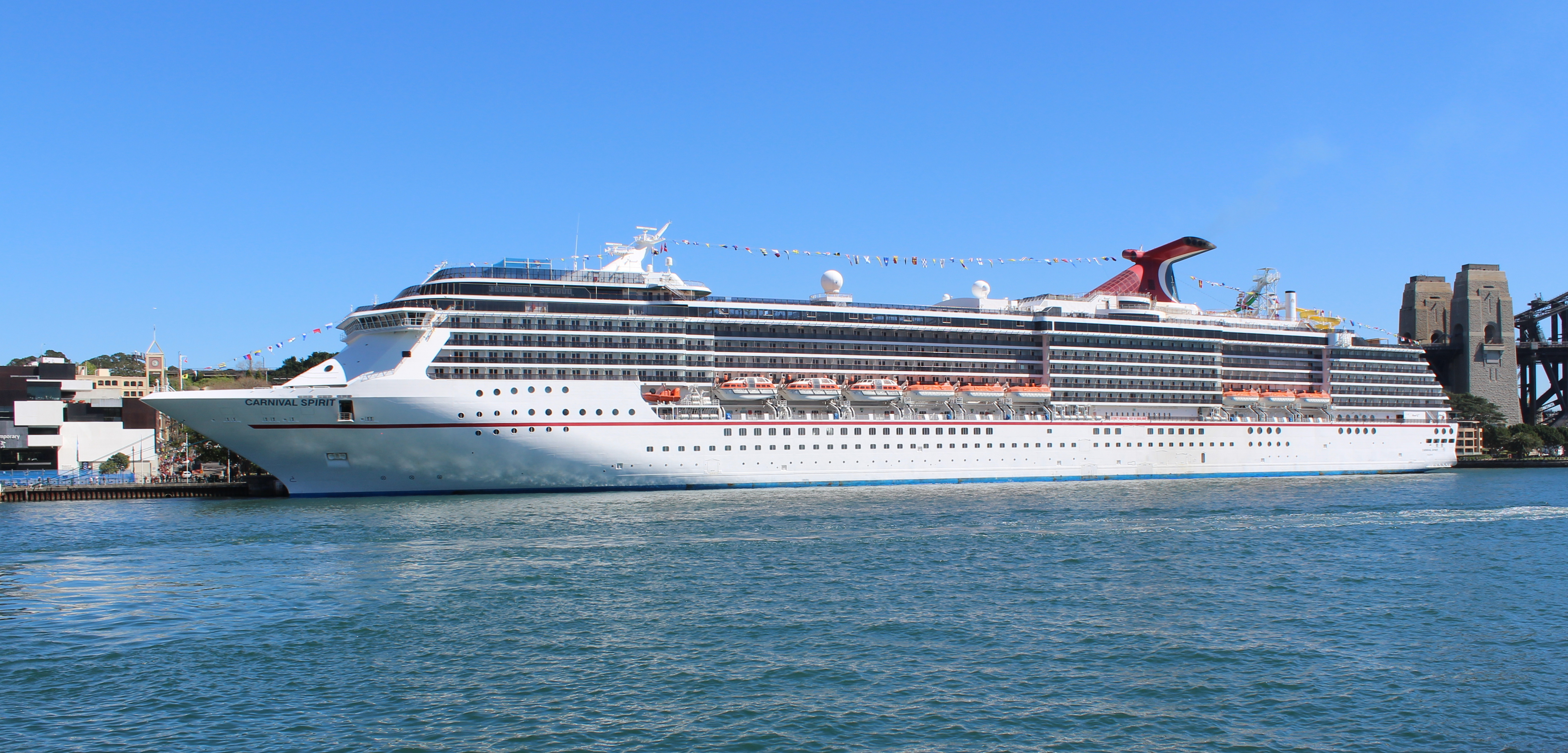
The Carnival Spirit, the first Spirit-class cruise ship in the fleet

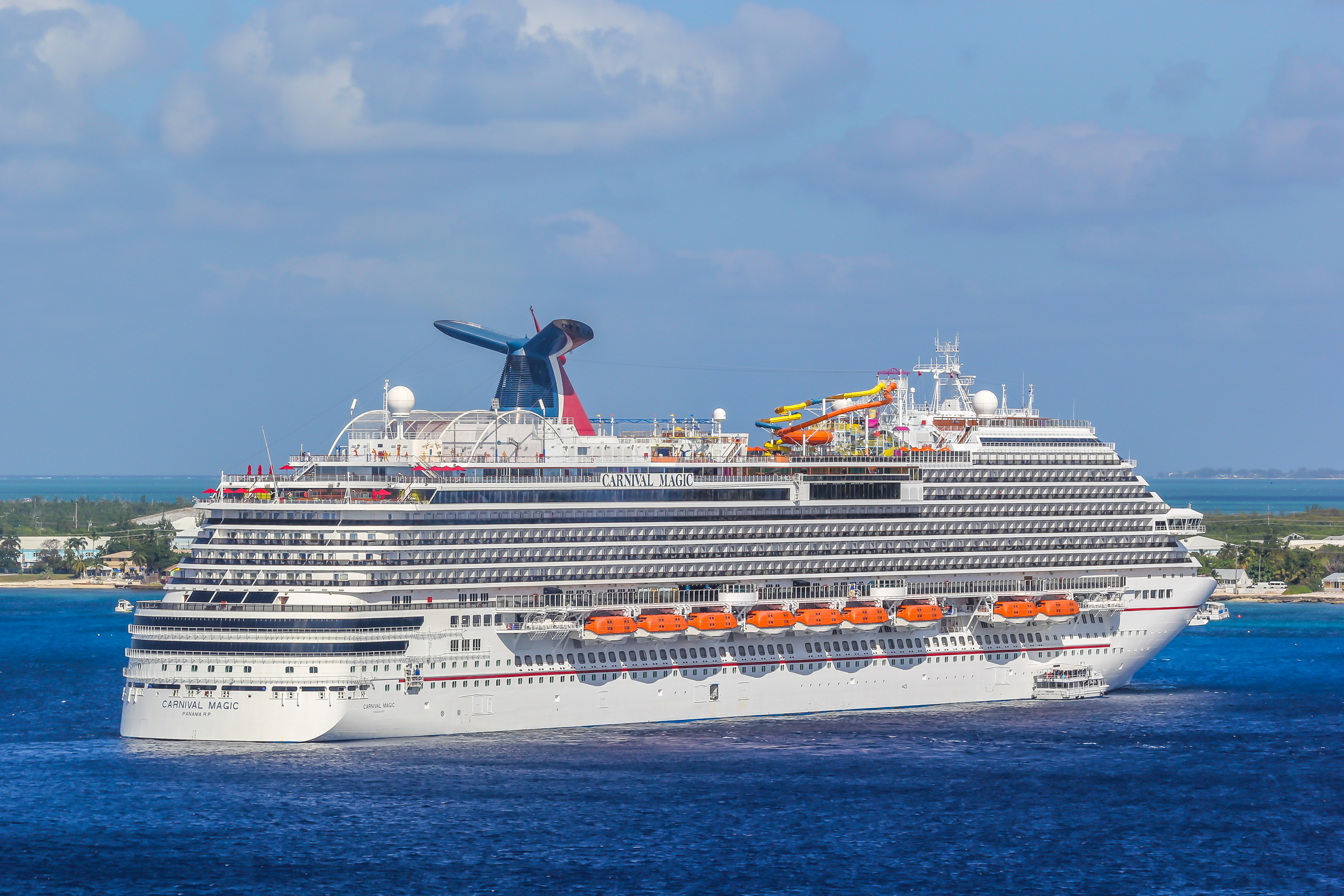
The Carnival Magic in Grand Cayman in 2012

In 2001, the new Panamax size Spirit class debuted with the Carnival Spirit, the first of the four-ship class within the Carnival fleet.

In 2001, Robert H. Dickinson, then President and CTC, participated in a BBC documentary, Back To The Floor. Dickinson went to work at the lowest crew levels on the Imagination in the Caribbean, where he shadowed a Romanian cleaner, Alina.

In 2001, Carnival transferred their first new build, the 1982 built Tropicale, to Costa Cruises. In the 2000s, Carnival continued to sell or transfer the other 1980s built ships to other lines, with the Jubilee in 2004, the Celebration in 2008, and the Holiday in 2009.

In October 2002, Carnival acquired P&O Princess Cruises for 3.5 billion euro.

In 2004, Carnival Corporation initiated a development program for Carnival's new ships, the Pinnacle Project, calling for a 200,000 GT prototype, which would have been the world's largest cruise ship at the time. The ship was cancelled, but they then developed a project called Next Generation.

In 2009, Carnival released their biggest ship at the time, the Carnival Dream, a new 128,000 GT ship. Carnival Dream entered service in September 2009. After several voyages in the Mediterranean, she was set to offer weekly Caribbean cruises from Port Canaveral from December 2009. A sister ship, Carnival Magic, debuted in May 2011. In December 2009, Carnival placed an order for a third Dream-class vessel. It entered service in June 2012 and its homeport is now Galveston. In May 2010, Carnival selected a name for their new Dream-class vessel in 2012 – Carnival Breeze.

=== 2010s ===
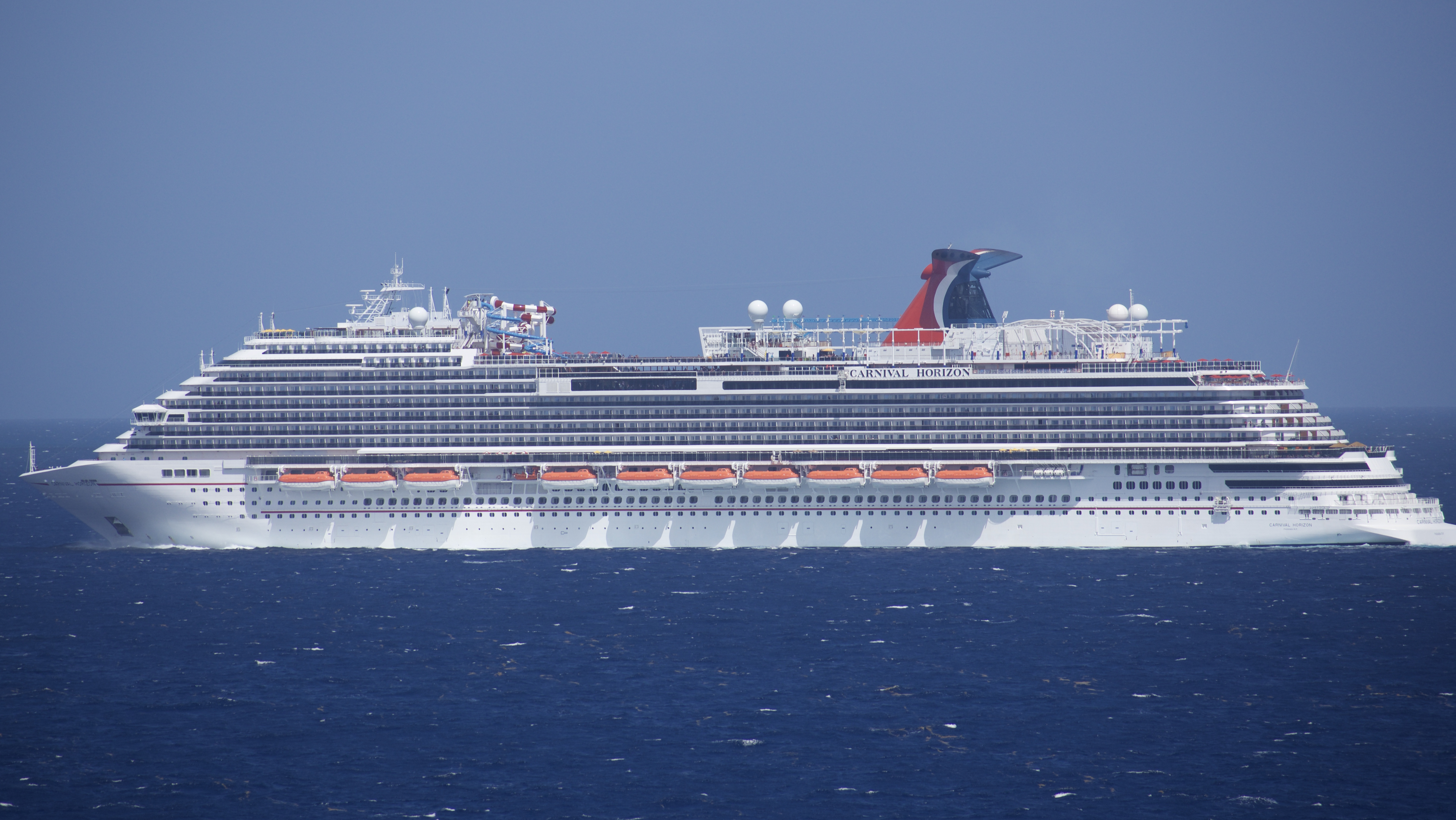
The Carnival Horizon off the coast of Grand Turk Island in 2018

In October 2012, Carnival ordered a new 133,500 GT ship. This ship, built by Fincantieri, was the largest ship they have ever built. The new ship was named Carnival Vista, and sailed her maiden voyage in May 2016, from Trieste, Italy.

In January 2017, Michael Thamm was appointed CEO of Carnival Asia, to oversee operations in China and the surrounding region.

In April 2018, Carnival Horizon, a sister to Carnival Vista, joined the fleet, with her inaugural voyage from Barcelona, Spain. Queen Latifah is the ship's godmother, and christened her on May 23, 2018.

In December 2019, Carnival Panorama, another sister to Carnival Vista, entered service as the cruise line's flagship. She became the first new ship to homeport on the West Coast since Paradise, now Carnival Paradise, in 1998. Both ships sailed from Long Beach, California.

In February 2018, the company's officials unveiled a major port development project in Ensenada, Mexico.

Reports in late June 2019 stated that Carnival was building its first terminal in Japan, in the port city of Sasebo, to be named Uragashira Cruise Terminal. Local officials were hoping that the terminal would be open by late July 2020.

==== Effects of COVID-19 pandemic on Carnival Cruise Line ====
In December 2019, the severe acute respiratory syndrome coronavirus 2 (SARS-CoV-2) pandemic, began with an outbreak of COVID-19 in Wuhan, China. In March 2020, all cruises were cancelled due to the worldwide pandemic. Eventually, 55 passengers on ships owned by Carnival Corporation & plc were reported as having died.

In April 2020, 18 Carnival ships met up in the Bahamas in order to sail the crew home. 12 ships were used. Carnival Breeze and Carnival Magic both sailed to Europe with stops in Southampton, UK; Cadiz, Spain; Civitavecchia, Italy; Dubrovnik, Croatia; and Istanbul, Turkey. Carnival Glory sailed to the Caribbean with stops at St Lucia, St, Vincent, Jamaica, Mexico, and Panama, where it received crew from Carnival Miracle. Carnival Fantasy sailed to Colon, Panama with the crew transiting to Central and South America from there. Carnival Dream and Carnival Conquest both sailed to east Asia with stops in Durban, South Africa and Manila, Philippines. Carnival Fascination, Carnival Liberty, and Carnival Ecstasy all sailed to Mumbai, India and Durban, South Africa. Carnival Panorama sailed from the west coast to the Philippines and Indonesia. After meeting up in Australia, Carnival Splendor sailed to Indonesia. Carnival Spirit sailed to the Philippines.

In a filing with regulators, the company stated that as of July 31, 2020, it had $7.9 billion in "cash and cash equivalent" available. An industry news item estimated that this would enable Carnival to continue operating for roughly a year in a situation where none of the ships was sailing. A few days earlier, the company confirmed that it had sold the Carnival Fantasy and Carnival Inspiration (which were to be scrapped) and that Carnival Fascination and Carnival Imagination would move to long term layup (storage).

In September 2020, the corporation, the corporate umbrella of nine cruise ship companies, including Carnival Cruise Line, announced a reduction in its fleet. The company intended to dispose of 18 of its ships, a full 12% of the group's fleet. By that time, several ships had already been scrapped, including the Carnival Fantasy and Carnival Inspiration. In September 2020, Carnival sold Carnival Fascination and Carnival Imagination as well. Carnival Corporation also said that it was delaying the delivery of several ships on order. The adjusted net loss in the third quarter for Carnival Corporation & plc was reported to the U.S. Securities and Exchange Commission as US$1.7 billion. For four straight fiscal quarters, Carnival Corporation & plc had quarterly revenues of $50 million or less (as low as $26 million in the first quarter of 2021), compared to more than $4.7 billion of revenue in previous quarters.

As of September 2020, the no-sail rule by the Centers for Disease Control and Prevention prohibited cruising in the U.S. until October 31, 2020, at the earliest. Members of the Cruise Lines International Association, including Carnival Cruise Line, announced in early August that its members were extending a voluntary suspension until October 31. That applied to cruises that were to depart from the U.S. or planned to stop at U.S. ports of call. On September 16, 2020, Carnival Cruise Line extended the suspension of four of its ships sailings well beyond October, to complete required dry-dock enhancements.

Costa Cruises began new sailings on September 6, 2020, in Italy, initially with two ships, Costa Deliziosa and Costa Diadema. At that time, the line required all passengers to be from Italy. By September 27, 2020, "Costa Cruises will be available for all European citizens who are residents in any of the countries listed in the most recent decree from the Prime Minister of Italy" according to a news report. The company implemented strict health protocols to protect its staff and guests.

Due to the effects of the COVID-19 pandemic, Carnival Fantasy, Carnival Imagination, Carnival Inspiration were all sold for scrapping. Carnival Fascination was initially sold to another line, only to be resold for scrapping a year later. The corporate parent's 4th quarter (ending November 30, 2020) financial statement released on January 11, 2021, indicated that one extra ship, in addition to the 18 previously planned, was to be sold. Carnival Corporation was in an excellent cash position, with US$9.5 billion, but suffered an adjusted net loss of $1.9 billion in the quarter.

In June 2021, Carnival stock shares fell by 6% after it was announced that some early passengers from the first cruises of 2021 had tested positive for COVID-19.

From October 23, 2022, Carnival Cruise line Passengers are not required to provide COVID-19 test prior to their arrival if the passenger is vaccinated and boosted.

=== 2020s ===
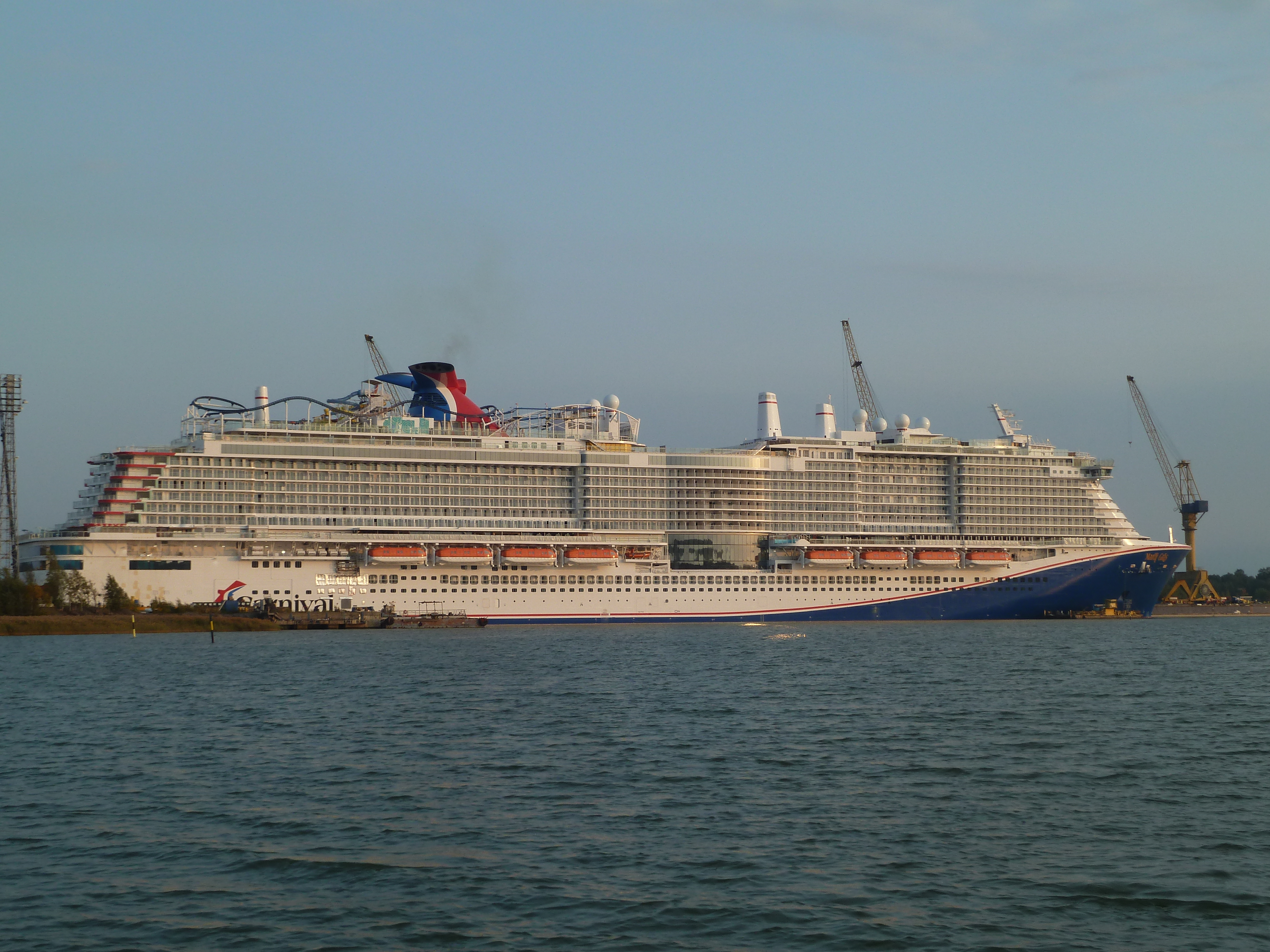
The Mardi Gras under construction in Meyer Turku in September 2020, one of the largest ships in the fleet.

In June 2021, it was announced that the Costa Magica would move from Costa Cruises to the Carnival fleet, and receive a new name and the updated Carnival livery. On the same day, Carnival also announced that an Excel class ship previously under construction for AIDA Cruises would be transferred to Carnival. Later in the year, the name was revealed to be Carnival Jubilee.

In July 2021, after numerous delays, the highly anticipated Mardi Gras entered service, sailing year round from Port Canaveral.

In early 2022, Carnival announce the retirement of Carnival Sensation and Carnival Ecstasy. Sensation was sold for recycling immediately, and Ecstasy remained in the fleet until October 2022.

In June 2022, Costa Luminosa joined the fleet as Carnival Luminosa replacing the previous plans of moving Costa Magica which remained with Costa. It began cruises from Brisbane, Australia in November 2022. It does Alaskan cruises from Seattle in the summers before returning to Australia in the winters.

In June 2022, Carnival's announced a new concept, Fun Italian Style, bringing over Costa Venezia and Costa Firenze and having the pair sail under the Carnival brand, while retaining their Italian designs and Costa funnels. Both ships will join the Carnival fleet in 2023 and 2024 respectively. In October 2022, Carnival released renderings of the ships and announced that the ships would get Carnival names, becoming Carnival Venezia and Carnival Firenze. They would receive the blue livery with twist, having a yellow stripe instead of the red and white ones found on the other Carnival ships.

In December 2022, Carnival announced it had been forced to delay the debut of Carnival Jubilee from October 2023 to December 2023 because of ongoing supply chain issues at the Meyer Werft shipyard.

In May 2023, the Carnival Venezia made its debut in Barcelona, Spain, ahead of its maiden season from Manhattan, New York.

In June 2024, it was announced that P&O Cruises Australia would cease operations in early 2025 with its services being merged into Carnival Cruise Line. Two of their ships, Pacific Adventure and Pacific Encounter were rebranded and integrated into the Carnival fleet and absorbed into Carnival Cruise Line from March 2025. These ships will continue to sail in the Australian region alongside Carnival Splendor and the seasonally based Carnival Luminosa. Carnival estimates that the transfer of the two ships, and the delivery of the two Excel-class ships by 2028, will result in a capacity increase of 50 percent since 2019.

In July 2024, Carnival ordered three new vessels from Fincantieri, each of approximately 230,000 GT and holding nearly 8,000 passengers. These ships are expected to be delivered in the summers of 2029, 2031, and 2033.

In April 2025 it was announced that the next two Excel-class ships will be named Carnival Festivale and Carnival Tropicale, after historic vessels from the past fleet.

In July 2025, Carnival announced new rules regarding teen curfew, banning clacking fans, stopping unruly behavior, barring dances like the "Wobble" dance, and most notably, a limitation of hip-hop music on deck, amongst others. The new rules gained backlash from some cruise-goers, as some criticized the cruise line of targeting specific cultural expressions and deemed the changes as "targeting Black travelers".

== Company structure ==
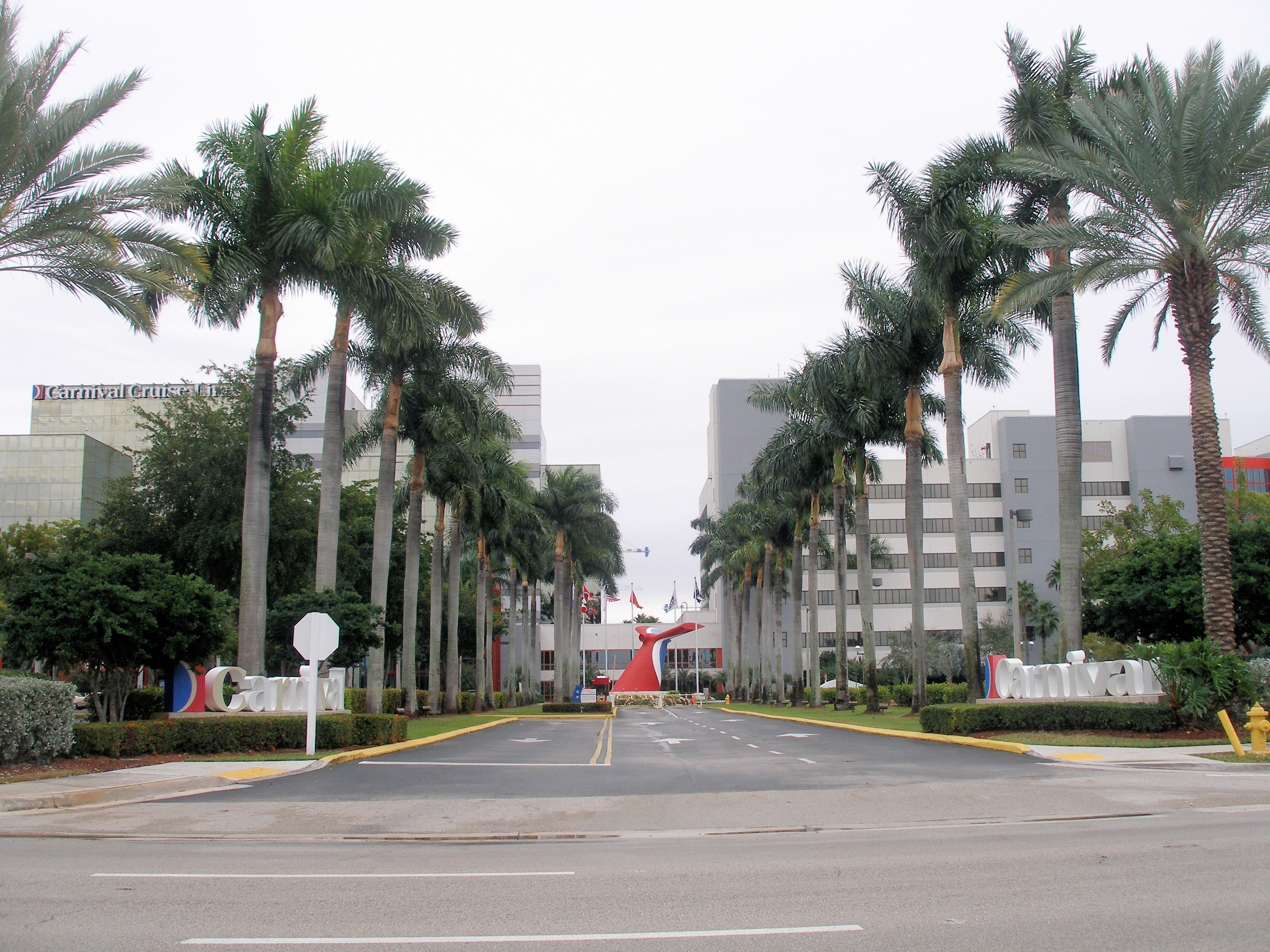
The Carnival Cruise Line headquarters in Doral, Florida

Carnival is one of ten cruise lines owned by the world's largest cruise ship operator, the American-British Carnival Corporation & plc. In 2021, Carnival Cruise Line was estimated to hold a 7.6% share of cruise industry revenue and 18.2% of passengers. It has 24 vessels and is the largest fleet in the Carnival group. The ships fly flags of convenience: 17 of the ships fly the Panama flag and seven that of the Bahamas. The company has legal domicile in Panama with plans to move it to Bermuda.

Its headquarters are in Doral, Florida, United States. The North American division of Carnival Corporation has executive control over the corporation and is headquartered in Doral. The headquarters of the company and its parent company are scheduled to move to the Waterford Business District in Miami-Dade County in 2028.

== Leadership ==
Carnival has had five presidents since its foundation in 1972.

Person	Tenure	Classes of ships introduced	Notes
Ted Arison	1972–1981	Empress, Festivale	Founded Carnival Cruise Line in 1972 after partnership broke up on bad terms at Norwegian Cruise Line. In 1990, Ted Arison renounced his U.S. citizenship and residence and returned to Israel, where he founded Arison Investments.
Micky Arison	1981–1993	Tropicale, Holiday, Fantasy	Expanded Carnival Cruise Line, led the 1987 IPO, and oversaw a number of critical acquisitions. Became chairman of the parent company (Carnival Corporation) in 1993
Robert H. Dickinson	1993–2008	Fantasy, Sunshine, Spirit, Conquest	Expanded the line further through strengthening relationships with travel partners
Gerald R. Cahill	2008–2015	Splendor, Dream	Successfully led Carnival Cruise Line through severe global recession and several high-profile events; expanded the line further
Christine Duffy	2015–present	Vista, Excellence, Spirit-Hybrid, Grand, all current ship classes and Project Ace	Leading an effort to emphasize the brand as "America's Favorite Cruise Line"

== Fleet ==
=== Current fleet ===
Ship	Build year	In service	Gross tonnage	Guest capacity	Flag	Notes	Homeport	Image
Fantasy class
Carnival Elation	1998	1998–present	71,909 GT	2,130	Panama	Originally Elation; First cruise ship equipped with azimuth thrusters	Jacksonville, FL	
Carnival Paradise	1998	1998–present	71,925 GT	2,124	Panama	Originally Paradise	Tampa, FL	
Sunshine (Destiny) class
Carnival Sunshine	1996	1996–present	103,881 GT	3,002	Bahamas	Formerly named Carnival Destiny (1996–2013) prior to refit.; Lead ship of the Sunshine (Destiny) class; World's largest passenger ship when built.; First cruise ship to exceed 100,000 GT. The first ship in the fleet to receive all Funship 2.0 amenities.; Currently the oldest ship in the Carnival fleet	Norfolk, VA Europe, Summer 2027 Galveston, TX (from Nov 2027)	
Carnival Sunrise	1999	1999–present	102,239 GT	2,984	Bahamas	Formerly named Carnival Triumph (1999–2019) prior to refit.; On February 14, 2013, the ship was towed to Mobile, Alabama for repairs after an engine room fire, and resumed service on June 13, 2013	Miami, FL New Orleans, LA (from June 2028)	
Carnival Radiance	2000	2000–present	102,232 GT	2,984	Panama	Formerly named Carnival Victory (2000–2020) prior to refit.	Long Beach, CA	
Spirit class
Carnival Spirit	2001	2001–present	85,920 GT	2,124	Bahamas	Lead ship of the Spirit class; In 2024 hit a large piece of blue ice in Tracy Arm Fjord, Alaska	Seattle, WA Alaska Summer seasons Mobile, AL Fall/Winter/Spring season 26/27 Tampa, FL Fall/Winter/Spring 27/28 Long Beach, CA Fall/Winter/Spring 28/29	
Carnival Pride	2001	2002–present	86,071 GT	2,124	Panama	Built to Panamax form factor; Former flagship of Carnival	Baltimore, MD	
Carnival Legend	2002	2002–present	85,942 GT	2,124	Bahamas	In 2009 collided with Enchantment of the Seas, which was already docked, in Cozumel, Mexico; In 2019 collided with Carnival Glory, which was also already docked, in Cozumel, Mexico	Tampa, FL (Until Apr 2027) Seattle, WA (Apr-Oct 2027) Long Beach, CA (From Oct 2027)	
Carnival Miracle	2004	2004–present	85,942 GT	2,124	Panama		Galveston, TX Fall/Winter/Spring 26/27 Europe Summer 2027 Baltimore, MD (from Nov 2027)	
Conquest class
Carnival Conquest	2002	2002–present	110,480 GT	2,980	Panama	Lead ship of the Conquest class	Miami, FL	
Carnival Glory	2003	2003–present	110,000 GT	2,980	Panama	• In 2019 collided with Carnival Legend, which was already docked, in Cozumel, Mexico	Port Canaveral, FL	
Carnival Valor	2004	2004–present	110,438 GT	2,980	Panama		New Orleans, LA Mobile, AL (from May 2027)	
Carnival Liberty	2005	2005–present	110,428 GT	2,980	Panama	First ship to receive some of the Fun 2.0 amenities	New Orleans, LA	
Carnival Freedom	2007	2007–present	110,556 GT	2,980	Panama	Caught fire in 2023; Caught fire again in 2024	Port Canaveral, FL Norfolk, VA (from May 27)	
Splendor (Concordia) class
Carnival Splendor	2008	2008–present	113,573 GT	3,012	Panama	Lead ship of the Splendor (Concordia) class; A Concordia-class cruise ship, built originally for Costa Cruises, transferred to Carnival during construction; Suffered an engine fire during a 2009 voyage to Mexican Riviera	Sydney, AUS	
Dream class
Carnival Dream	2009	2009–present	128,251 GT	3,646	Panama	Lead ship of the Dream class	Galveston, TX New Orleans, LA (From May 2027)	
Carnival Magic	2011	2011–present	128,048 GT	3,690	Panama		Miami, FL	
Carnival Breeze	2012	2012–present	128,052 GT	3,690	Panama	First Carnival ship not designed by American architect Joe Farcus	Galveston, TX Port Canaveral, FL (From April 2028)	
Vista class
Carnival Vista	2016	2016–present	133,596 GT	3,934	Panama	Lead ship of the Vista class	Port Canaveral, FL Miami, FL (From May 2028)	
Carnival Horizon	2018	2018–present	133,596 GT	3,960	Panama		Miami, FL Galveston, TX (From May 2027)	
Carnival Panorama	2019	2019–present	133,868 GT	4,008	Panama	Originally destined for P&O Cruises Australia but was transferred during construction	Long Beach, CA	
Carnival Venezia	2019	2023–present	135,225 GT	4,208	Bahamas	Previously sailed for Costa Cruises as Costa Venezia (2019–2023); First ship to sail under the Carnival Fun Italian Style concept.	Port Canaveral, FL Miami, FL (from May 2027)	
Carnival Firenze	2020	2024–present	135,156 GT	4,126	Panama	Previously sailed for Costa Cruises as Costa Firenze (2021–2024); Sails under the Carnival Fun Italian Style concept.	Long Beach, CA Miami, FL (Feb-May 2027) New York, NY (Summer 2027) Port Canaveral, FL - (From Nov 2027)	
Excel class
Mardi Gras	2020	2021–present	181,808 GT	5,282	Bahamas	Lead ship of the Excel class; Name erroneously announced as Carnival Mardi Gras on December 5, 2018, episode of Wheel of Fortune; First LNG-powered cruise ship based in North America; Named after the original Mardi Gras, Carnival's first cruise ship; Features the first roller coaster at sea; Debut delayed from August 2020 to July 2021 amid the COVID-19 pandemic	Port Canaveral, FL	
Carnival Celebration	2022	2022–present	183,521 GT	5,282	Bahamas	Sister ship to Mardi Gras and Carnival Jubilee; Name announced on August 21, 2020, which includes "Carnival" prefix	Miami, FL	
Carnival Jubilee	2023	2023–present	183,521 GT	5,282	Bahamas	Sister ship to Mardi Gras and Carnival Celebration.; Ship originally ordered for AIDA cruises.; Largest Carnival ship and flagship of the fleet; Features a Texas star on her bow; Christened in Galveston, Texas in February 2024	Galveston, TX	
Luminosa (Vista Spirit Hybrid) class
Carnival Luminosa	2009	2022–present	92,720 GT	2,260	Bahamas	Lead ship of the Luminosa (Vista Spirit Hybrid) class; Previously sailed for Costa Cruises as Costa Luminosa (2009–2022); Vista (2002) Spirit hybrid-class cruise ship, marketed by Carnival as part of their Spirit class; Will not have all Fun Ship 2.0 features immediately.	Brisbane, AUS – Australian Fall/Winter/Spring seasons San Francisco, CA – American Summer season 2027 Baltimore, MD - Winter/Spring 28/29	Carnival Luminosa
Adventure (Grand) class
Carnival Adventure	2001	2025–present	108,865 GT	2,600	Bahamas	Lead ship of the Adventure (Grand) class; Formerly sailed as Golden Princess for Princess Cruises.; Transferred to P&O Cruises Australia in October 2020.; Transferred to Carnival Cruise Line	Sydney, AUS Singapore (Feb-Mar 2027) Melbourne, AUS (Mar/Apr 27) Sydney, AUS (Apr/May 27) Auckland, NZ (May/July 27) Sydney, AUS (Aug 27/Jan 28) Adelaide, AUS (Feb/Mar 28) Seattle, WA (May-Sept 28)	
Carnival Encounter	2002	2025–present	108,977 GT	2,600	Bahamas	Formerly sailed as Star Princess for Princess Cruises.; Transferred to P&O Cruises Australia in October 2020; Transferred to Carnival Cruise Line	Brisbane, AUS	

=== Future fleet ===
Ship	Build Year	Maiden Voyage	Gross tonnage	Flag	Notes	Image
Excel class
Carnival Festivale	2027	2027	182,800 GT	Panama	Sister ship to Carnival Jubilee.; Delivery planned for spring 2027; Being built at Meyer Werft, Germany.; First order by the Carnival Corporation for five years; Floated out in September 2026.; Will be homeported in Port Canaveral, FL in 2027	
Carnival Tropicale	2028	2028	182,800 GT	Panama	Sister ship to Carnival Jubilee.; Being built by Meyer Werft, Germany.; Will be home-ported in Galveston, TX in 2028	
Project Ace
Carnival Destiny	2029	2029	230,000 GT	Panama	Largest ship for Carnival Cruise Line; Will be built by Fincantieri, Italy	
TBA	2031	2031	230,000 GT	Panama	Sister ship to the 2029 new build	
TBA	2033	2033	230,000 GT	Panama	Sister ship to the 2029 new build	
Unnamed Class
TBA	2033	2033	130,000 GT	Panama	Will be built by Fincantieri, Italy	
TBA	2035	2035	130,000 GT	Panama	Sister ship to the 2033 new build	

=== Former fleet ===
Ship	Inservice	Gross tonnage	Flag	Notes	Image
Converted ocean liners
Mardi Gras	1972–1993	27,284 registered as 18,261	Panama	First ship of Carnival Cruise Line; Originally known as Empress of Canada (1960–1972); Sold by Carnival in 1993 and later renamed Olympic, Star of Texas, Lucky Star, Apollo and Apollon; Scrapped in Alang in 2003	
Carnivale	1975–1993	31,500	Panama	Previously known as Empress of Britain and Queen Anna Maria; Later renamed Fiesta Marina, Olympic and The Topaz; Scrapped in Alang in 2008	
Festivale	1977–1996	32,697	Panama	Previously known as Transvaal Castle, S.A. Vaal; Later renamed Island Breeze and Big Red Boat III; Scrapped in Alang in 2003	
Tropicale class
Tropicale	1982–2001	36,674	Panama	Lead ship Of the Tropicale class; Carnival's first purpose-built ship; also the first with the "whale tail" funnel; Also known as Costa Tropicale, Pacific Star and Ocean Dream; Scrapped in Alang in 2021	
Holiday class
Jubilee	1986–2004	47,262	Liberia	In 2004, Jubilee became Pacific Sun for P&O Cruises Australia, and later operated as Henna for HNA Tourism Cruise from 2012 to 2015.; Scrapped in Alang in 2017	
Celebration	1987–2008	47,262	Portugal	In 2008 Celebration became Grand Celebration for Iberocruceros. It was transferred to Costa in late-2014 as Costa Celebration but never saw service. It was sold to Bahamas Paradise Cruise Line as the Grand Celebration in February 2015.; Scrapped in Alang in 2021	
Holiday	1985–2009	46,051	Portugal	Lead ship Of the Holiday class; In 2009, Holiday became Grand Holiday for Iberocruceros. It sailed with Cruise & Maritime Voyages as Magellan until summer 2020.; Scrapped in Alang in 2021	
Fantasy class
Carnival Fantasy	1990–2020	70,367	Panama	Lead ship of the Fantasy class; Design derived from Holiday class; Originally named Fantasy; Scrapped in Aliağa in 2020.	
Carnival Fascination	1994–2020	70,367	Bahamas	Originally named Fascination; Sold to Century Harmony Cruises and renamed Century Harmony.; Scrapped in Gadani in 2022	
Carnival Imagination	1995–2020	70,367	Bahamas	Originally named Imagination; Scrapped in Aliağa in 2023	
Carnival Inspiration	1996–2020	70,367	Bahamas	Originally named Inspiration; Scrapped in Aliağa in 2020	
Carnival Sensation	1993–2022	70,367 GT	Bahamas	Originally named Sensation; In passenger service until March 2020. It did not return to passenger service following the COVID-19 shutdown but remained in the fleet until February 2022.; Scrapped in Aliağa in 2022	
Carnival Ecstasy	1991–2022	70,367 GT	Panama	Originally named Ecstasy; Briefly returned to passenger service from March 5 to October 15, 2022, following the COVID-19 shutdown.; Retired from service on October 15, 2022; Scrapped in Aliağa in 2022	

== Accidents and incidents ==
On September 19, 1999, Tropicale's engine room caught fire en route from Cozumel to Tampa. While disabled in the Gulf of Mexico, the ship was struck by Tropical Storm Harvey. The Tropicale spent two days without propulsion.

On November 8, 2010, a fire broke out in the generator room of Carnival Splendor and the ship lost power. The ship was adrift off the west coast of Mexico until she was towed to San Diego.

On February 10, 2013, Carnival Triumph, with 3,143 passengers aboard, suffered an engine room fire, leaving the ship adrift for four days in the Gulf of Mexico. The engine fire led to a power outage on the ship, which in turn caused raw sewage to back up. The media dubbed the ordeal "The Poop Cruise". The ship was towed to Mobile, Alabama, docking on the evening of February 14, 2013. In subsequent litigation, Carnival documents were uncovered that revealed multiple generator maintenance problems creating a "disaster waiting to happen". In response, Carnival's court filing stated that the contract that passengers agree to when they buy a ticket "makes absolutely no guarantee for safe passage, a seaworthy vessel, adequate and wholesome food, and sanitary and safe living conditions".

On March 14, 2013, Carnival Dream experienced an emergency generator failure while docked in port at Philipsburg, Sint Maarten. The ship was scheduled to leave port around 5 p.m. ET the day before. The United States Coast Guard said they were notified by Carnival that Carnival Dream was experiencing emergency generator problems. Carnival announced that the passengers would be flown back to Florida rather than completing their scheduled voyage.

On the morning of March 15, 2013, Carnival Legend suffered a mechanical problem with one propulsion pod while at sea. The cruise line cancelled Carnival Legend's scheduled stops in Belize and Grand Cayman, and the ship returned to Tampa, Florida at a reduced speed of 19 knots (22 mph) (Legend has a regular cruising speed of 24 knots).

On December 27, 2015, an electrician who had been working on Carnival Ecstasy was crushed to death while working in an elevator. The accident had heavy publicity after a video was posted online.

In February 2018, a series of fights broke out on Carnival Legend. Staff were criticized for not containing the brawls and for exercising heavy force against passengers.

On May 3, 2018, a pipe burst in Carnival Dream's fire suppression system, flooding 50 staterooms.

In November 2018, Carnival Sunshine experienced a technical issue which caused the ship to list for approximately one minute.

On December 29, 2018, lifeboat number 28 broke loose from Carnival Dream for unknown reasons and was damaged. Carnival decided to abandon the lifeboat at sea and purchase a new replacement. No one was on board the lifeboat at the time and no injuries were reported.

In the evening on September 20, 2019, while passing through Panama Canal, the former Carnival Fantasy collided with the lock's wall and sustained damage to the aft superstructure. No injuries were reported. The collision occurred while the lock's water levels were being lowered. The vessel was not under her own power but assisted/tugged by the Panama Canal's locomotives. The accident occurred during the 10-day Panama Canal cruise.

On October 9, 2019, a 23-year-old passenger fell off a railing where he was sitting onto a lower deck while Carnival Valor was sailing near Louisiana. He was flown to a New Orleans hospital by helicopter and said to be in critical condition.

On December 20, 2019, Carnival Glory and Carnival Legend collided while in the port of Cozumel, Mexico; Carnival Glory's stern superstructure was damaged and one person received minor injuries.

On February 16, 2022, a 32-year-old woman leapt from the tenth deck of Carnival Valor after being detained by ship security. The search was suspended by the United States Coast Guard after 14 hours.

On May 26, 2022, Carnival Freedom suffered a fire within her funnel. The vessel was docked in Grand Turk during the incident. The fire was extinguished with no injuries reported.

On June 28, 2022, a large fight aboard Carnival Magic around 5:30 am prompted NYPD response upon arrival into New York City.

In June 2022, the New York Department of Financial Services announced a US$5 million fine for Carnival due to cybersecurity violations. The department stated that the violations were "significant" and that from 2019 to 2021 Carnival had four security breaches that exposed considerable amounts of consumer data. The department went on to state that Carnival failed to meet security regulation by not using two factor authentication and additionally did not report one of their data breaches.

On September 19, 2026, on Carnival Panorama, a passenger attending the cruise was declared missing. Because of this, everyone else had to return to their staterooms. Later that day, the ship turned round after discovering the missing passenger had gone overboard. The Florida coast guard was notified, as well as other authorities. The crew could not find the missing passenger, leaving the search to the authorities, giving support to their family, and allowing everybody to leave their rooms.

== Controversies ==
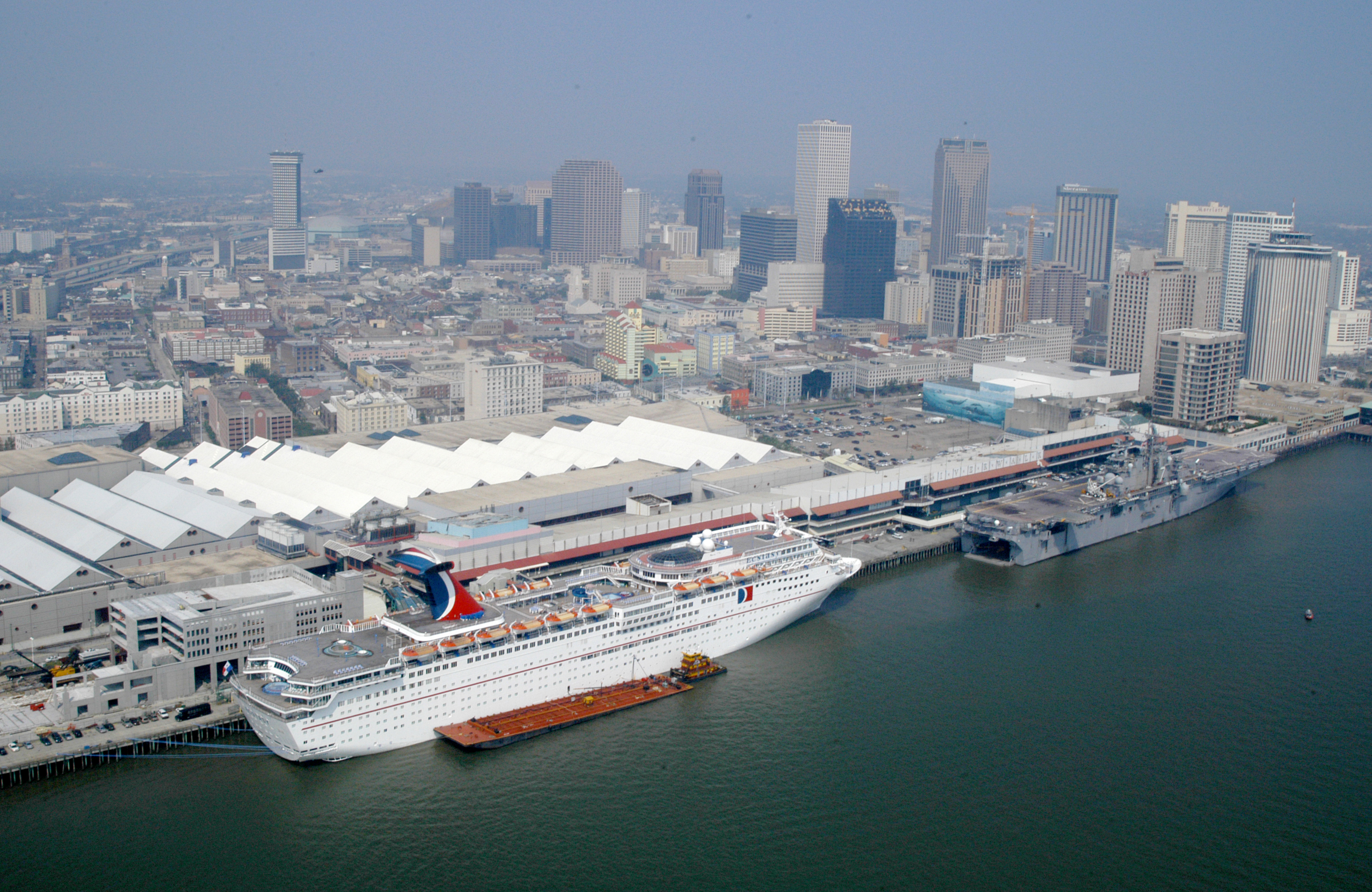
Carnival Ecstasy docked in New Orleans behind USS Iwo Jima in November 2005, were used for housing after Hurricane Katrina.

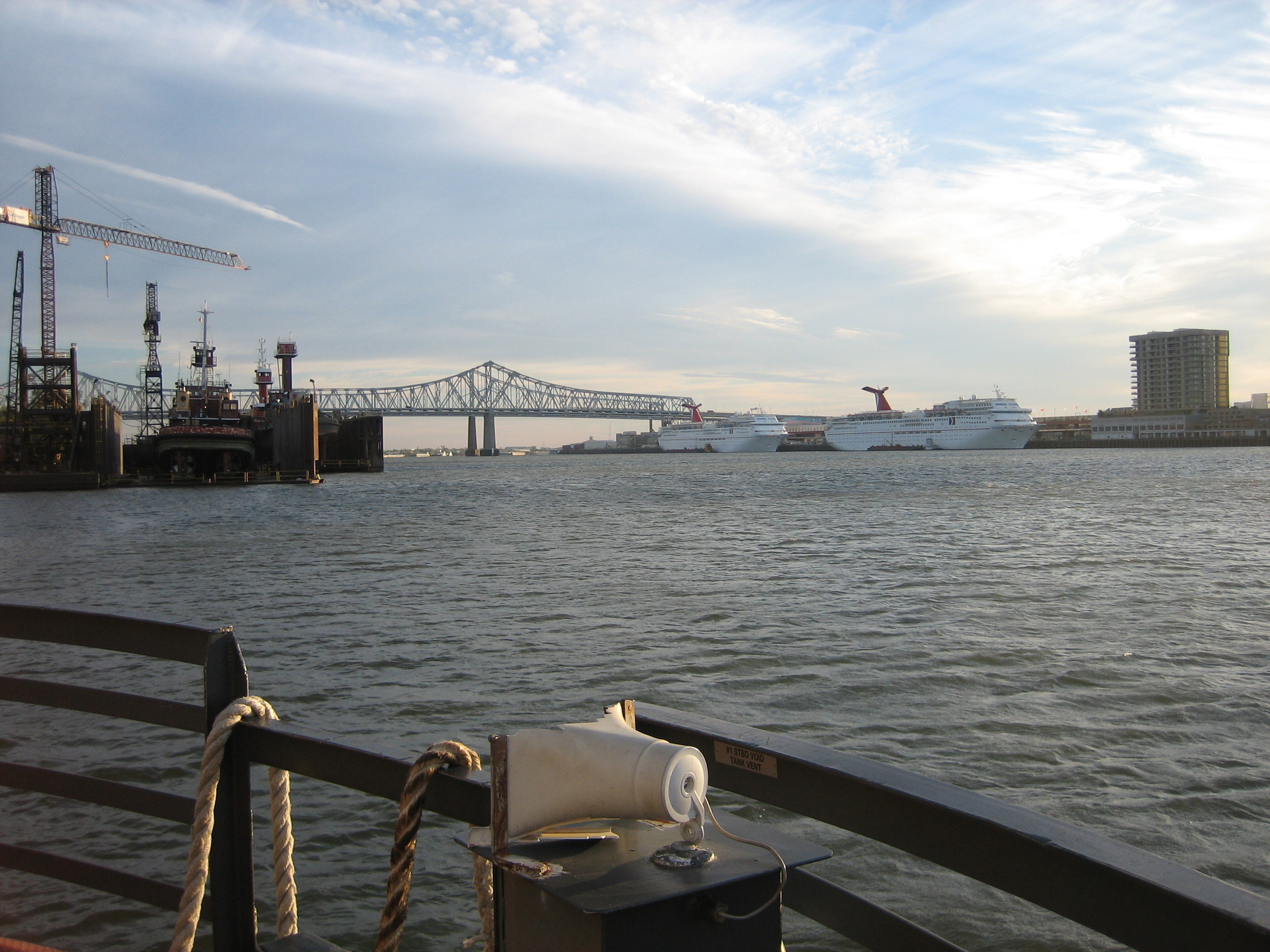
Carnival's ships, docked in New Orleans in November 2005, were used for housing after Hurricane Katrina.

In the aftermath of Hurricane Katrina, three of the Carnival cruise ships were chartered by the United States government for six months to serve as temporary housing, until houses could be rebuilt. After being chartered for six months, their planned voyages were cancelled, and passengers were refunded. Holiday was originally docked in Mobile, Alabama, and later Pascagoula, Mississippi. Ecstasy and Sensation were docked at New Orleans, Louisiana. The six-month contract cost $236 million. The contract was widely criticized, because the vessels were never fully utilized, and Carnival received more money than it would have earned by using the ships in their normal rotation.

=== Employment ===
In 2012, the company was reportedly paying cruise ship staff basic salaries equivalent to £0.75 per hour. For example, a junior waiter would earn a basic salary of £250 a month, for shifts lasting at least 11 hours, seven days a week. In response to this controversy, the general secretary of the Trades Union Congress, Brendan Barber, commented: "It's high time the disgraceful practice of allowing the shipping industry to pay poverty wages to workers who don't live in the UK was stopped. Exploitative rates of pay for those working on British ships have no place in a modern society." In October 2013, Carnival revoked retirement benefits for cruise staff. In May 2012, Carnival dismissed 150 crew members from India for protesting low wages.

=== Environmental and pollution ===
Since 2017, Carnival Corporation has been on probation, after having been found to be "illegally dumping oil into the ocean from its Princess Cruises ships and lying about the scheme". Carnival Corporation also had to pay a $40 million fine. The court summary states that "Princess was convicted and sentenced in April 2017, after pleading guilty to felony charges stemming from its deliberate dumping of oil-contaminated waste from one of its vessels and intentional acts to cover it up".

In April 2019, Carnival Corporation was accused of violating probation rules. The allegations include 800 incidents from April 2017 to April 2018. A federal judge has threatened to impose severe fines which may increase tenfold. The judge also stated that Carnival ships may be temporarily banned from docking in US ports. In early June 2019, Carnival Corp. agreed to pay $20 million in fines in an agreement with federal prosecutors. The proposed settlement documents were signed by Chairman Micky Arison on June 3, 2019.

On June 4, a Senior US District Judge approved the deal, and confirmed that probation would continue for three years, after CEO Arnold Donald said, "The company pleads guilty. We acknowledge the shortcomings. I am here today to formulate a plan to fix them". The company promised to implement additional audits to check for violations, to provide improved training to staff, to start improved waste management practices and to set up a more effective method for reporting pollution incidents to government agencies.

In June 2019, Carnival Corporation and its Princess subsidiary agreed to pay a criminal penalty of $20 million for further environmental violations that include dumping plastic waste into the ocean. Princess Cruises had already paid $40 million over prior deliberate acts of ocean pollution.

== See also ==
- Carnival Air Lines, former charter and scheduled airline division
- Carnival Cruise Lines, Inc. v. Shute, a 1991 Supreme Court case about forum selection clauses
- Carnival Cruise Line Tycoon 2005: Island Hopping, video game
- Cruise Confidential, 2008 book
- Fiesta Marina Cruises, short-lived subsidiary of Carnival
- Private island
