= Christine Duffy =

American businesswoman

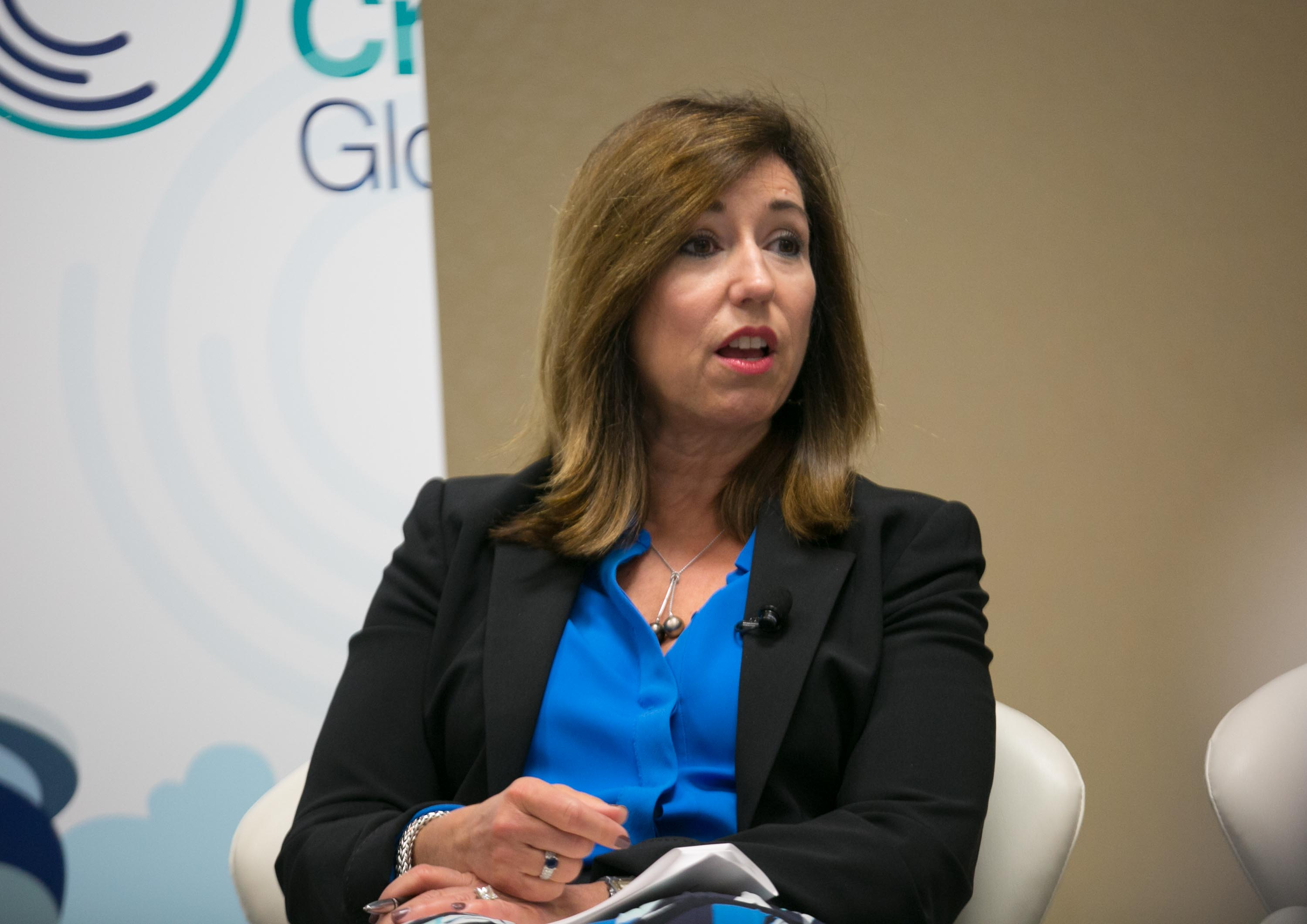
- Duffy in 2017
- Born: 1960 or 1961 (age 64–65) (Note: In 2014, Duffy was reported to be 53); Philadelphia, Pennsylvania, U.S.
- Occupation: President of Carnival Cruise Line
- Spouse: Andrew Duffy

Christine DeVone Duffy is an American businesswoman. She is the president of Carnival Cruise Line.

== Early life and education ==
Duffy was born and raised in Northwood, Philadelphia to an entrepreneur father, mother, and sister. She attended H.R. Edmunds Elementary School and Warren G. Harding Middle School.

After graduating from Frankford High School, Duffy attempted to become an airline attendant but was too short. Her dream to become a flight attendant grew from the travelling she did in her youth to visit family in Europe.

== Career ==
After being rejected from her dream of becoming a flight attendant, Duffy accepted a placement as a receptionist at Rosenbluth Travel. Duffy eventually earned a position as a travel agent at McGettigan Travel in Philadelphia. She stayed with the company for 20 years and eventually became president. When the company was bought out by Maritz Travel Co., she became Maritz’s president and chief executive. She was the first female president in Maritz Travel Co. history. While serving as president, she also sat on the Meeting Professionals International (MPI) board of directors and was its chairwoman in 2005 and 2006. She also founded MPI’s Women’s Leadership Initiative and served as its inaugural chairwoman. In 2010, Duffy left Maritz to become president of Cruise Lines International Association (CLIA). As President, she was named the godmother of AmaWaterways ship the AmaCerto in 2012.

In 2015, Duffy became the first female president of Carnival Cruise Line, replacing Gerald Cahill. Upon accepting the promotion, Duffy visited all Carnival ships, met with employees, and shadowed staff members to understand the cruise line. In 2018, she was honored by the South Florida Business Journal as an Influential Business Women.

In June 2022, she was recognized by the International Hospitality Institute as one of the 100 Most Powerful People in Hospitality.
