= Dream-class cruise ship =

Cruise ship class

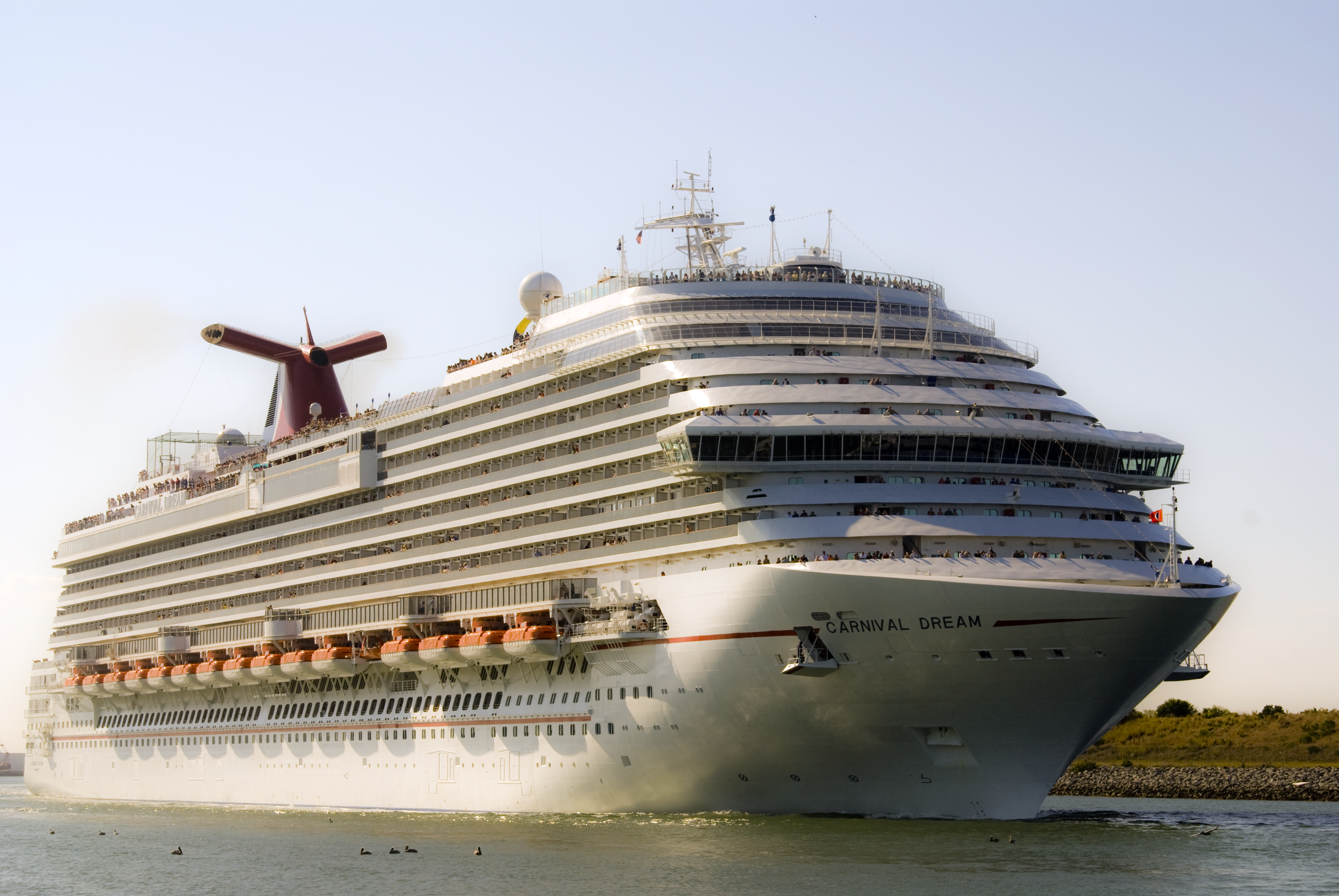
- The lead ship of the class, Carnival Dream departing Port Canaveral

Class overview
- Builders: Fincantieri in Monfalcone and Marghera, Italy
- Operators: Carnival Cruise Lines; Costa Crociere
- Preceded by: Concordia class
- Succeeded by: Vista class
- Built: 2008–2014
- In service: 2009–present
- Planned: 4
- Completed: 4
- Active: 4

General characteristics
- Type: Cruise ship
- Tonnage: 130,000 GT
- Length: 1,004 ft (306.02 m)
- Beam: waterline: 122 ft (37.19 m); extreme: 158 ft (48.16 m)
- Draught: 27 ft (8.23 m)
- Decks: 14 passenger decks
- Installed power: 6 engines generating 75,600 or 67,200 kW (101,400 or 90,100 hp) (Costa Diadema)
- Propulsion: Diesel-Electric
- Speed: 22.5 knots (41.7 km/h; 25.9 mph)
- Capacity: Normal: 3,646 (double occupancy); Maximum: 4,631
- Crew: 1,367

The Dream class is a class of cruise ships, operated by Carnival Cruise Lines and Costa Cruises. The lead vessel of the class, Carnival Dream, entered service in September 2009.

Carnival Dream and her sisters, Carnival Magic, Carnival Breeze and Costa Diadema, measure about 130,000 gross tonnage (GT) and the first three were the largest ships ever built for Carnival Cruise Line until Carnival Vista launched in 2015. The vessels design is an evolution from the Conquest-class cruise ships. Notable additions in the designs are a half-mile exterior promenade on deck 5, with outside cafes, Jacuzzis situated along the edge of the promenade (on the Carnival trio), and an Aqua Park.

== History ==
The first Dream-class vessel, which was eventually named Carnival Dream, was ordered on December 14, 2005, from Italian shipbuilder Fincantieri. The order also includes the ships: Nieuw Amsterdam, for Holland America Line; Ruby Princess, for Princess Cruises; and Costa Pacifica, for Costa Cruises. The four ships, and the options, were simultaneously ordered by Carnival Corporation for US$3 billion.

Carnival Dream then launched at Monfalcone on 24 October 2008. The ship was delivered on 17 September 2009, eleven months after her launch, at the Monfalcone yards.

The option for a second vessel was exercised, which turned into Carnival Magic. The ship was ordered on 18 December 2006 and keel was then laid on 12 January 2010. The ship debuted on 1 May 2011.

The third ship was ordered 1 December 2009, which was named Carnival Breeze on 11 May 2010. She sailed on 3 June 2012.

Costa Cruises has ordered a ship of 132,500 GT, Costa Diadema in 2012, which is a fourth sister to this class.
Delivered on 25 October 2014, she sailed her inaugural cruise on 1 November, christened and began regular service on 8 November.

== Ships ==
Ship	Year ordered	In service	Gross tonnage	Homeport	Flag	Notes	Image
Carnival Cruise Line
Carnival Dream	2006	2009–present	128,251 GT	Galveston, Texas New Orleans, Louisiana (from May 2027)	Panama		
Carnival Magic	2007	2011–present	128,048 GT	Miami, Florida	Panama		
Carnival Breeze	2010	2012–present	128,052 GT	Galveston, Texas Port Canaveral, Florida (from April 2028)	Panama		
Costa Cruises
Costa Diadema	2012	2014–present	132,500 GT	Savona, Italy	Italy	Largest Dream-class cruise ship.	

== See also ==
- List of cruise ship classes
