= Carnival Magic =

2011 Dream-class cruise ship

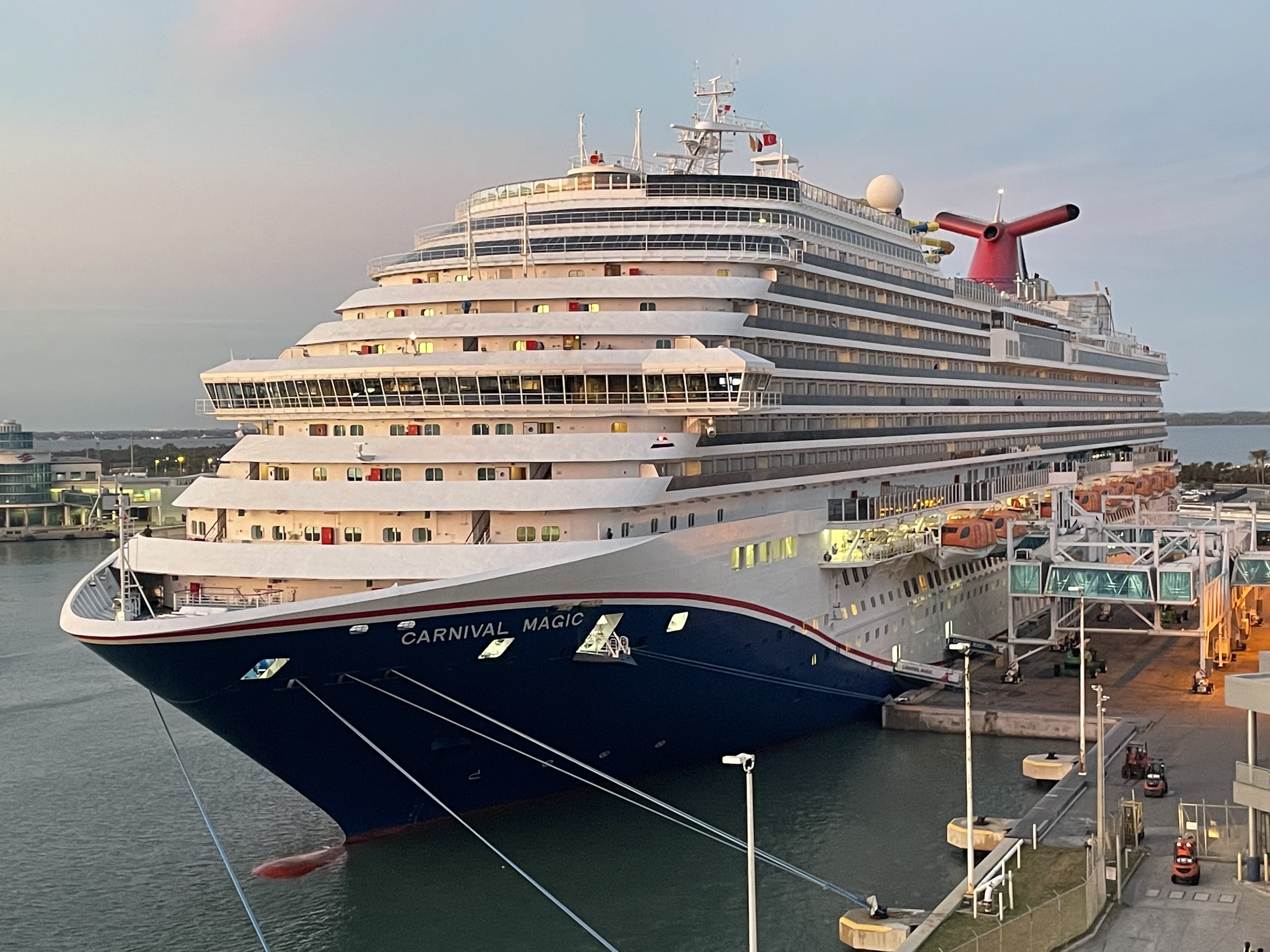
- Carnival Magic at Port Canaveral, 2023

History

Panama
- Name: Carnival Magic
- Owner: Carnival Corporation & plc
- Operator: Carnival Cruise Line
- Port of registry: Panama
- Ordered: 2007
- Builder: Fincantieri, Monfalcone, Italy
- Cost: US$740 million
- Yard number: 6167
- Laid down: 20 November 2008
- Launched: 27 August 2010
- Christened: 1 May 2011, by Godmother Lindsey Wilkerson
- Completed: 29 April 2011
- Maiden voyage: 1 May 2011
- In service: 2011–present
- Identification: Call sign: 3ETA8; IMO number: 9378486; MMSI number: 370491000
- Status: In Service

General characteristics
- Class & type: Dream-class cruise ship
- Tonnage: 130,000 GT; 13,073 DWT
- Length: 306.471 m (1,005 ft 5.8 in)
- Beam: 37.18 m (122 ft 0 in) (waterline); 48 m (158 ft) (max)
- Draught: 8.4 m (27 ft 7 in)
- Depth: 11.21 m (36 ft 9 in)
- Decks: 14 passenger decks, 17 decks total
- Installed power: 6 × Wärtsilä 12V46; 75,600 kW (101,400 hp) (combined)
- Speed: 22.5 knots (41.7 km/h; 25.9 mph) (cruise); 25 knots (46 km/h; 29 mph) (max)
- Capacity: 3,690 (double); 4,724 (max)
- Crew: 1,386

Carnival Magic is a Dream-class cruise ship which entered service on 1 May 2011. The ship was named and christened in Venice by her godmother Lindsey Wilkerson Alsup, a former patient and current employee at St. Jude Children's Research Hospital.

== Construction and design ==
Carnival Magic was laid down on 20 November 2008, launched from her drydock on 27 August 2010 and completed on 29 April 2011. Sea trials were undertaken between 17 and 20 March 2011. She has 1,845 passenger cabins and 746 crew cabins, and can carry over 6,000 persons in total.

The lifeboat configuration of Carnival Magic differs from that of her sister ship, Carnival Dream, in that Carnival Magic has 18 double-size lifeboats, while Carnival Dream has 30 smaller boats. Carnival Magic also has a large, highly visible SkyCourse ropes course forward of her funnel that is not present on her sister.

There are 19 decks (although marked as having 15 decks on the deck plan because there is no "Deck 13" on Carnival ships) aboard Carnival Magic.

== History ==
Carnival Magic spent her inaugural season, summer 2011, cruising the Mediterranean Sea. She then made a transatlantic crossing in late 2011, and was homeported in Galveston, Texas, from which she made Caribbean Sea cruises. On 2 July 2013, during a seven-day Caribbean cruise, a 39-year-old male guest died when he fell from his cabin balcony and landed on an open deck area three decks below. In October 2014 a Texas Health Presbyterian Hospital Dallas employee who may have handled lab specimens from Ebola victim Thomas Eric Duncan after he boarded the ship on 12 October in Galveston. The hospital employee and her spouse showed no signs of the virus, but voluntarily quarantined themselves on the ship. The ship was allowed to dock in Belize, but the quarantined couple was refused the ability to disembark; thus derailing the plan to offload the couple for a flight home. Mexico went a step further and did not grant docking privileges to the ship. A United States Coast Guard helicopter flew to Carnival Magic on 18 October to obtain blood samples. The following day the Texas Health Presbyterian Hospital employee and her spouse were allowed to disembark in Galveston after the tests were determined to be negative for both the employee and her spouse.

In April 2016, her homeport changed to Port Canaveral, Florida, from which she continued making Caribbean cruises. Carnival Magic was dry-docked in June 2016 which included refurbishment of some public areas. During the suspension of service due to COVID-19, she underwent a second dry dock for expansion of the casino area, in addition to obtaining the blue/white livery seen on the cruise line's other ship Mardi Gras.

Carnival Magic re-positioned to Miami, Florida in September 2018, sailing seven-day eastern and western Caribbean cruises. She was expected to move homeport to Fort Lauderdale, Florida in May 2019.

As of February 2021, itineraries included trips from Port Canaveral (Orlando, Florida) to the Caribbean; New York to Bermuda, Canada, and New England; and Norfolk to the Bahamas, Bermuda, and the Caribbean starting in November 2021.

Following Carnival's suspension of service due to COVID-19, Carnival Magic recommenced cruises on 7 August 2021 with sailings from Port Canaveral to the Bahamas. In May 2023, a young man fell from the ship off the coast of Florida. It is not known how he fell off. On 7 February 2024, the ship was damaged after striking a pier in rough weather while docked in Jamaica. However, after being inspected, the ship was cleared and resumed sailing.
