= Fiesta Marina Cruises =

- Company type: Cruise line
- Industry: Hospitality
- Founded: 1993
- Defunct: 1994
- Fate: Brand discontinued
- Headquarters: Miami, Florida
- Products: Cruises

Fiesta Marina Cruises was an experimental short-lived subsidiary cruise line of Carnival Cruise Lines. It was marketed toward the Latin/Spanish-speaking population, residing in the United States and abroad. The cruise line sailed out of San Juan, Puerto Rico and Caracas, Venezuela. It operated only one ship, the Fiesta Marina, which was named in Miami, Florida on October 18, 1993

The cruise line was a marketing failure and was dissolved in September 1994. The Fiesta Marina was sold to Epirotiki Cruises to sail as the Olympic. In 2007, the Carnival Corporation started a partnership with the Orizonia Corporación to launch a new cruise line called Iberocruceros, also marketed toward the Latin/Spanish-speaking population. The cruise line operated out of South America and Europe, independently from Carnival, but was managed by Costa Cruises. Iberocruceros was closed in 2014 and its ships transferred to Costa or elsewhere.

== Former fleet ==
Ship	Year Built	Sailed for Fiesta Marina	Gross Tonnage	Flag	Notes	Image
Fiesta Marina	1956	1993–1994	31,500 GT	Panama	Renamed using the same Carnival Cruise Lines funnel livery. She was the former Carnival Cruise ship Carnivale. She was also previously known as the Empress of Britain, and the Queen Anna Maria. She later became the Olympic and The Topaz. She was sold for scrap in 2008.	
