= RMS Empress of Britain (1955) =

Transatlantic ocean liner built in Scotland

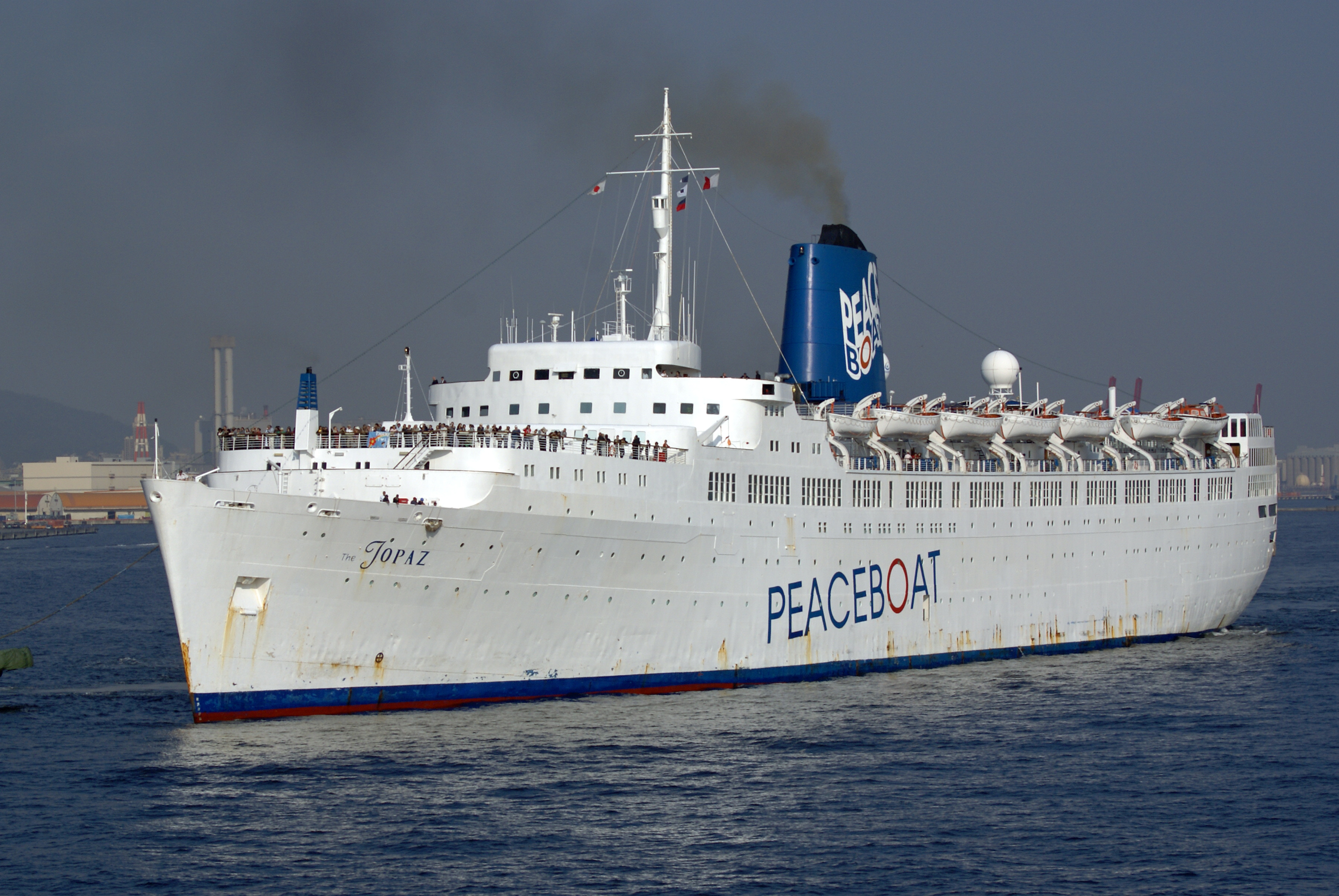
- RMS Empress of Britain as TSS The Topaz Departs Kobe in Japan on October 30, 2006

History
- Name: 1955–1964: Empress of Britain; 1964–1975: Queen Anna Maria; 1975–1993: Carnivale; 1993–1994: Fiestamarina; 1995–1997: Olympic; 1997–2008: The Topaz; 2008: Topaz
- Owner: 1956–1963: Canadian Pacific Steamships; 1964–1975: Greek Line; 1975–1994: Carnival Corporation & plc; 1995–1997: Epirotiki Line; 1997–2003: TUI Travel PLC; 2003–2008: Topaz International
- Operator: 1956–1965: Canadian Pacific Steamships; 1965–1975: Greek Line; 1975–1993: Carnival Cruise Lines; 1993–1994: Fiesta Marina Cruises; 1995–1996: Epirotiki Line; 1996–1997: Royal Olympic Cruises; 1998–2003: Thomson Cruises; 2003–2008: Peace Boat
- Port of registry: 1956–1965: London, United Kingdom; Panama City,Panama; 1993–1998: Piraeus,Greece; 1998–2008: Panama City,Panama; 2008: Basseterre, Saint Kitts and Nevis
- Route: Liverpool-Greenock-Quebec-Montreal (1965, Haifa-Piraeus-New York City, Cruising)
- Builder: Fairfield Shipbuilding and Engineering, Govan, Scotland
- Yard number: 731
- Launched: 22 June 1955 by Queen Elizabeth II
- Christened: 22 June 1955
- Completed: 1956
- Maiden voyage: 20 April 1956
- In service: 1955–2008
- Out of service: April 2008
- Identification: Call sign: V4XW; IMO number: 5103924
- Fate: Sold for scrap in 2008.

General characteristics
- Type: Ocean liner
- Tonnage: 25,516 GRT; 21,716 GRT (1965)
- Length: 640 ft (200 m)
- Beam: 85.2 ft (26.0 m)
- Draught: 29 ft (8.8 m)
- Installed power: 30,000 shp (22,000 kW)
- Propulsion: Geared turbines, twin propellers
- Speed: 20 knots (37 km/h; 23 mph)
- Capacity: As built, 160 1st-class & 894 tourist-class passengers (1965, 168 1st class, 1,145 tourist. 741 one class when cruising)
- Crew: 464

RMS Empress of Britain was a transatlantic ocean liner built by Fairfield Shipbuilding at Govan on the Clyde in Scotland in 1955–1956 for Canadian Pacific Steamships (CP). This ship – the third of three CP vessels to be named Empress of Britain – regularly traversed the trans-Atlantic route between Canada and Europe until 1964, completing 123 voyages under the Canadian Pacific flag.

== History ==
=== Empress of Britain ===
Empress of Britain was built by Fairfield Shipbuilding in Govan near Glasgow, Scotland. She was christened on 22 June 1955 by Queen Elizabeth II. This was nearly fifty years after the first CP Empress of Britain was launched from Govan in November 1905. Eleven months later, she set out on a maiden voyage from Liverpool to Montreal, leaving Liverpool on 20 April 1956.

The 25,516-ton vessel had a length of 640 feet (200 m), and her beam was 85.2 feet (26.0 m). The ship had one funnel, one mast, twin propellers and an average speed of 20 knots (37 km/h; 23 mph). The ocean liner provided accommodation for 160 first class passengers and for 984 tourist class passengers.

=== Queen Anna Maria ===
In November 1964, the former CP Empress of Britain was sold to the Greek Line. The ship was renamed Queen Anna Maria. This "Queen" was rebuilt with a new lido area at the stern and remeasured under Greek rules to 21,716 gross register tons, implying a significant reduction in size. Her genuine tonnage had been increased by a superstructure extension at the stern and the measurement was an attempt to reduce dock dues.

With accommodation for 168 first-class passengers and for 1,145 tourist-class passengers, she sailed on the Piraeus, Palermo, Naples, Lisbon, Halifax, Nova Scotia, and New York route. She later sailed the Haifa, Limassol, Piraeus, Palermo, Naples, Lisbon, Halifax and New York route, occasionally calling at Boston before New York. In due course, these liner services were replaced by full time, one class, cruising. In 1975, she was laid up at Piraeus for a time.

=== Carnivale ===
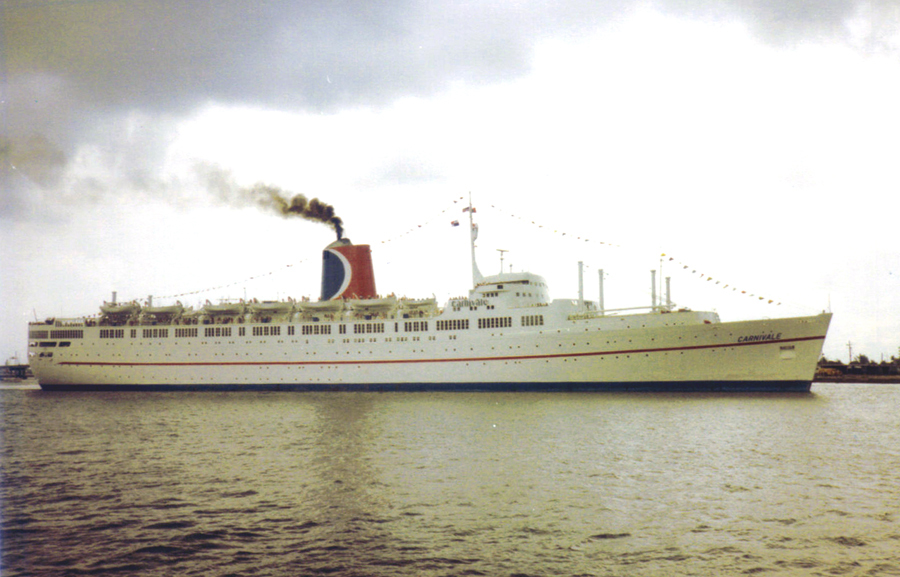
Carnivale at Miami, Florida, on 15 June 1984

In 1976, the former Greek Queen was sold to Carnival Cruise Lines. The ship was renamed Carnivale. As Carnival's market expanded and the company could afford to buy new ships, the ship transferred into a Latin market subsidiary cruise line.

=== Fiesta Marina ===
In 1993, Carnival Cruise Lines transferred registration of the Carnivale to a subsidiary cruise line, Fiesta Marina Cruises. The ship was renamed Fiesta Marina. She became something of a test ship in a cruise line expansion venture, which proved ultimately to be unsuccessful.

=== Olympic ===
In 1994, Fiesta Marine sold ex-Fiesta Marina to Epirotiki. The ship was renamed Olympic. In 1996, she was transferred to Royal Olympic Cruises, operating under the same name.

=== The Topaz ===
In 1997, the former Olympic was sold to Cyprus-based Thomson Holidays. The ship was renamed The Topaz.

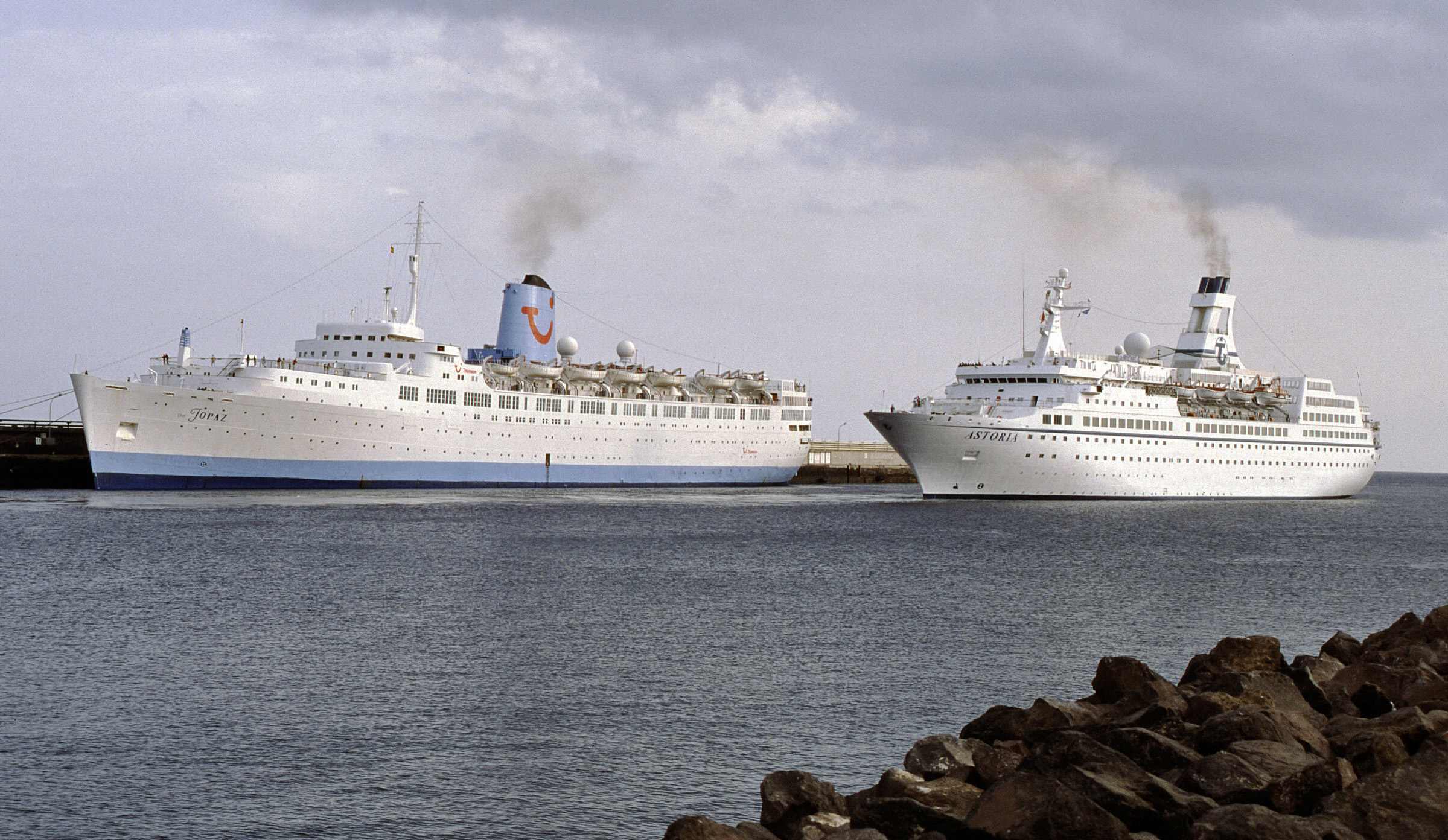
Topaz in Thompson Cruises TUI livery

In 2003, the vessel was chartered, and then later sold to Topaz International to sail for Peace Boat, operating under the name Peace Boat. She was repainted white with a blue funnel, with her name painted in large letters across both sides of the hull. In October 2005, The Topaz was inspected and found to be in immaculate condition, the steam turbines engines operating flawlessly.

Topaz International were looking for a buyer for The Topaz and they had maintained the ship in excellent condition. It was hoped that a buyer could be found as The Topaz offered a potential buyer the opportunity of a ready to work ship. However, rising oil prices, combined with inefficient 50-year-old engines proved too much for any potential buyer. In April 2008, The Topaz was retired from the Peace Boat organization.

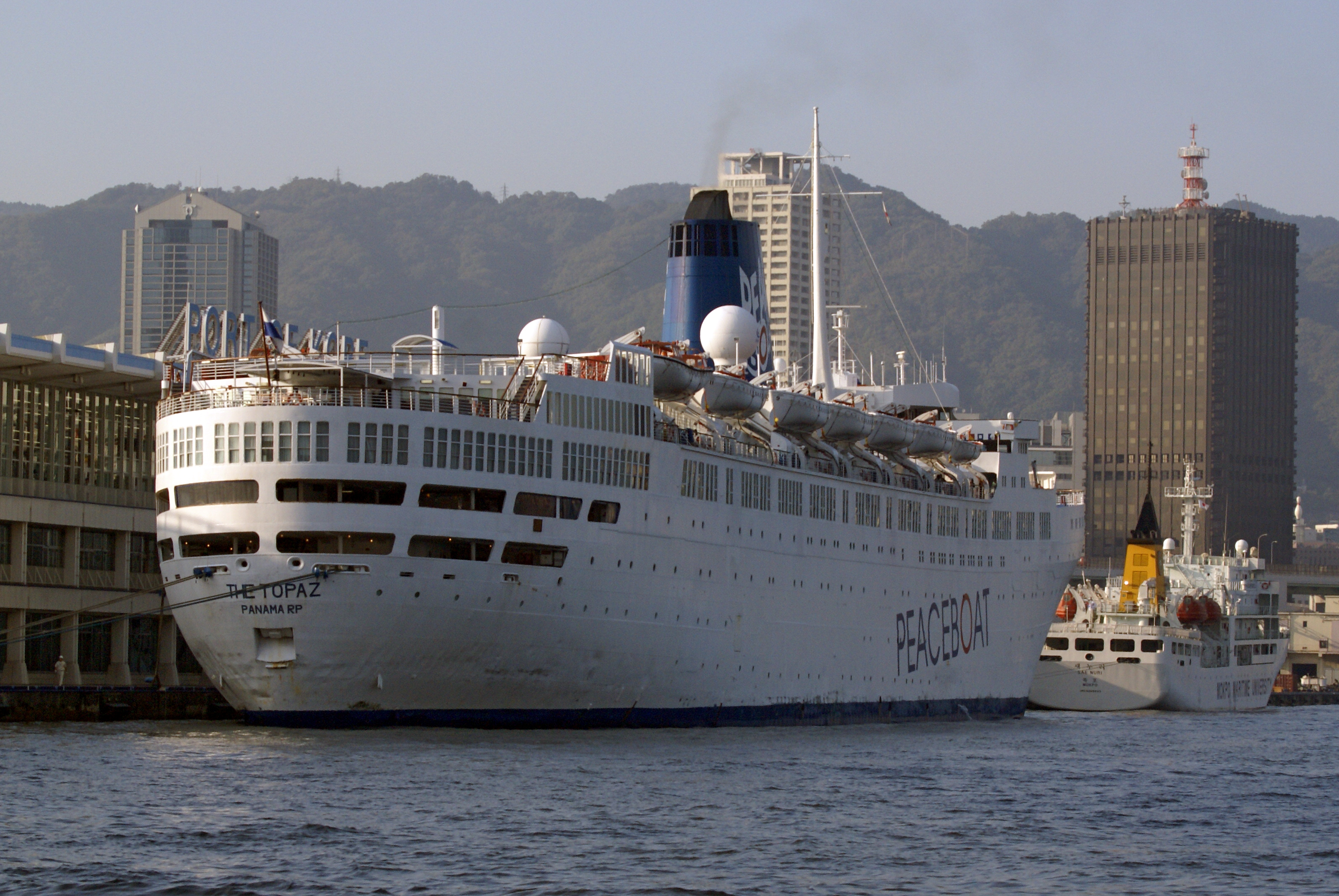
The Topaz docked in Kobe, Japan, October 2006

== After retirement ==
After The Topaz was retired in April 2008, she was laid up. On 15 June, while she was anchored, she was struck by the tanker Champion Brali. The collision severed part of her bow. During her lay up, she was sold to the breakers. In mid 2008, Topaz was beached at Alang, India, to be scrapped. She was placed close to the remains of the SS France/SS Norway. The ship began demolition a few months after being beached.

== See also ==
- Ships built at Govan
