= Carnival Breeze =

Cruise ship operated by Carnival Cruise Line

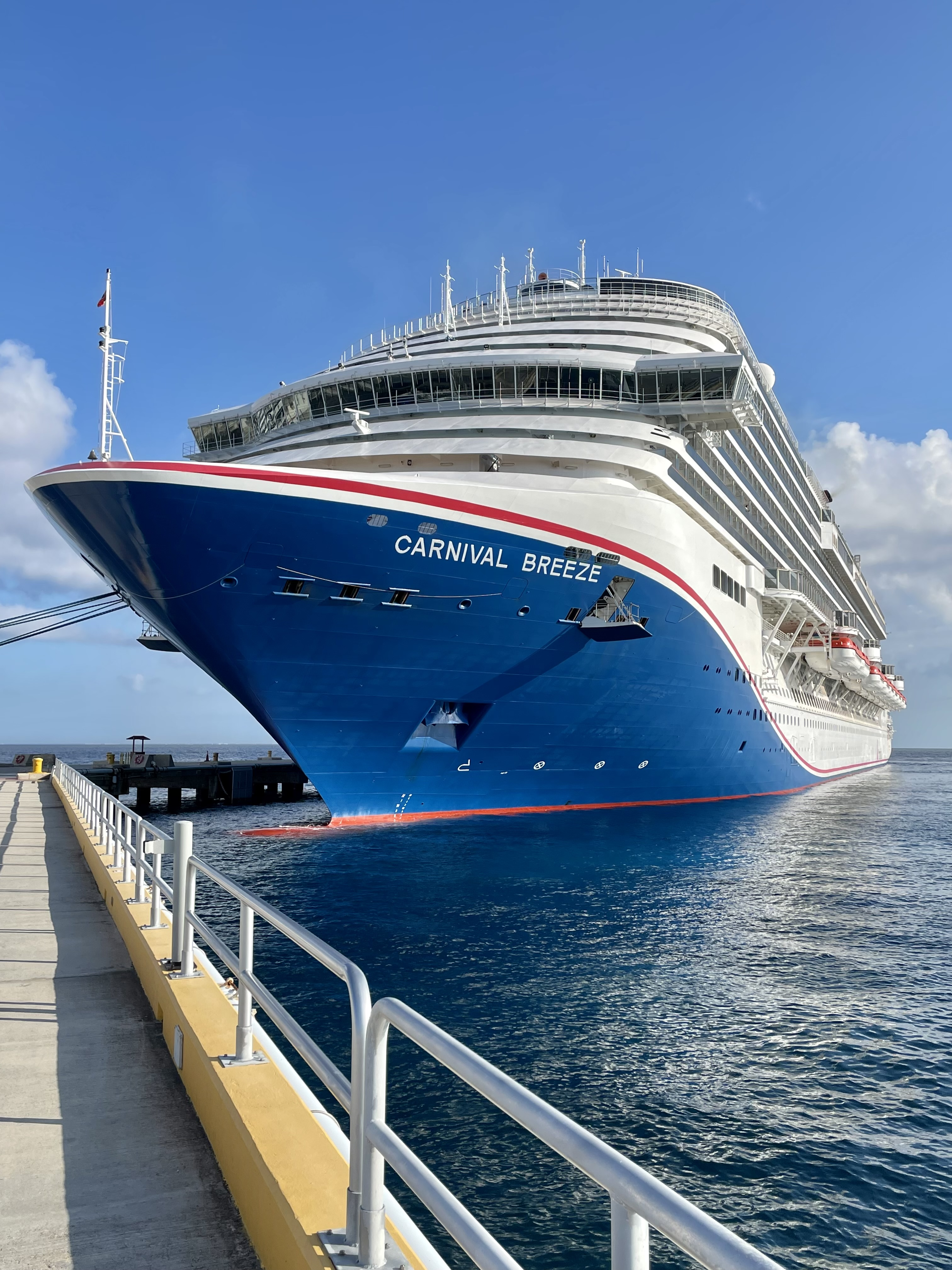
- Carnival Breeze at Cozumel, Mexico on 22 June 2022

History

Panama
- Name: Carnival Breeze
- Owner: Carnival Corporation & plc
- Operator: Carnival Cruise Line
- Port of registry: Panama
- Ordered: 2010
- Builder: Fincantieri
- Cost: US$740 million
- Laid down: 20 November 2008
- Launched: 16 September 2011
- Christened: 8 December 2012
- Completed: 3 June 2012
- Maiden voyage: 3 June 2012
- In service: June 2012
- Identification: Call sign: 3FZO8; IMO number: 9555723; MMSI number: 354842000
- Status: In Active Service

General characteristics
- Class & type: Dream-class cruise ship
- Tonnage: 130,000 GT; 10,250 DWT
- Length: 306.02 m (1,004 ft 0 in)
- Beam: 37.2 m (122 ft 1 in)
- Draught: 8.20 m (26 ft 11 in)
- Decks: 15
- Installed power: 6 × Wärtsilä 12V46; 75,600 kW (101,400 hp) (combined)
- Speed: 22.5 knots (41.7 km/h; 25.9 mph)
- Capacity: 3,690 passengers
- Crew: 1,386

Carnival Breeze is a Dream-class cruise ship of Carnival Cruise Line which was laid down on 20 November 2008, launched on 16 September 2011 and completed on 3 June 2012.

== Concept and construction ==
Carnival Breeze is the third and last Dream-class ship built for Carnival but Costa Crociere also operates a Dream-class ship. Fincantieri Monfalcone of Italy is the builder. The Dream-class vessels were the largest passenger ships ever built by Fincantieri at the time of their construction.

The ship's godmother is Tracy Wilson Mourning, a motivational speaker and founder of the Honey Shine girls' empowerment charity.

== Areas of operation ==
From June to November 2012 she sailed out of Barcelona, Spain and Venice, Italy on Mediterranean Sea cruises, and afterwards from Miami, Florida to the Caribbean Sea and Bahamas. In May 2016, she moved to Galveston, Texas. In April 2017 Carnival Breeze entered dry dock, at the Grand Bahamas Shipyard, for the first time since entering service in 2012. Carnival Breeze is currently homeported in Galveston, Texas after moving from Florida due to the COVID-19 pandemic. She continues cruising to the Caribbean.

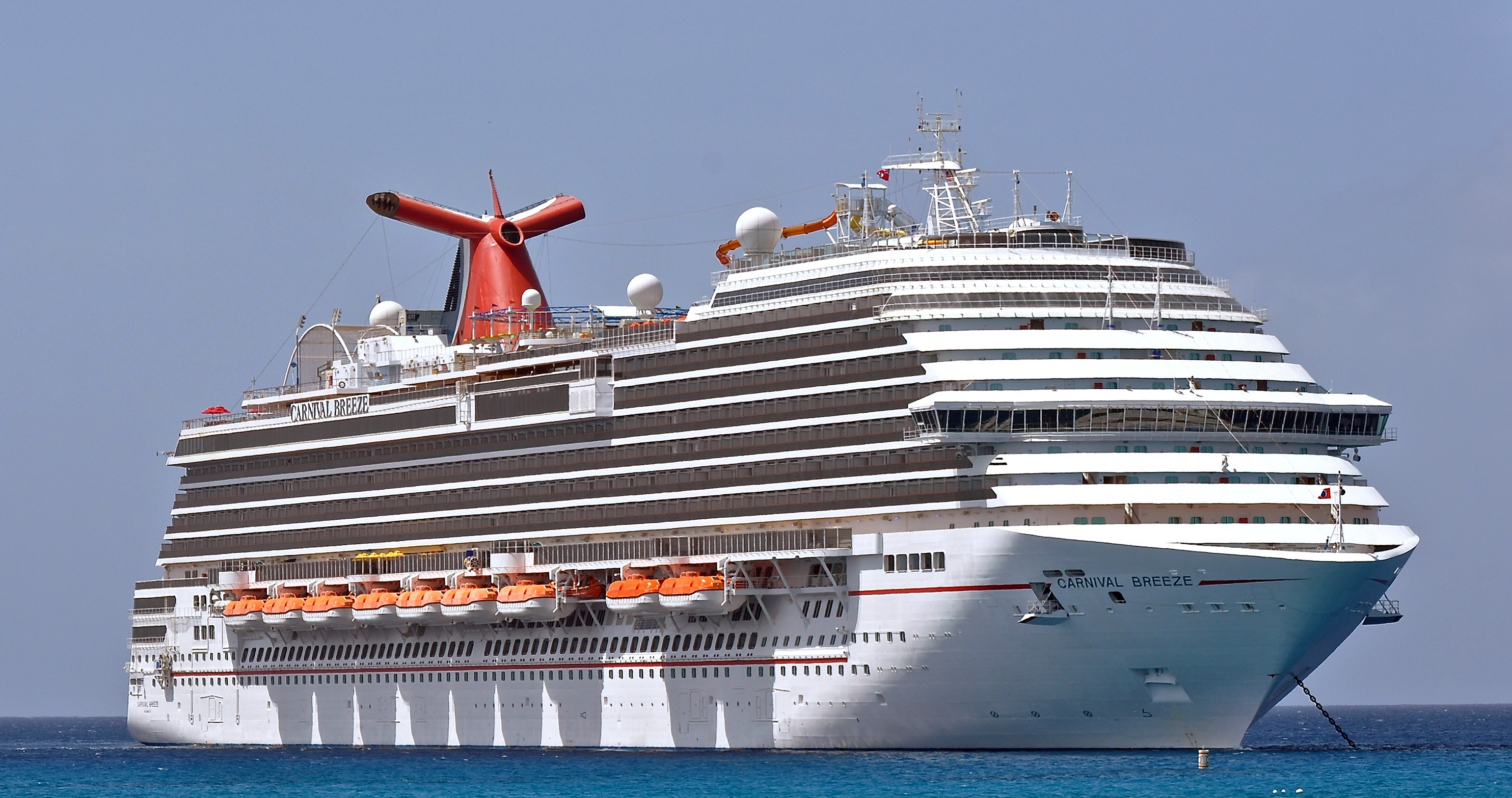
Carnival Breeze in George Town, Grand Cayman on 8 October 2014

== Incidents ==
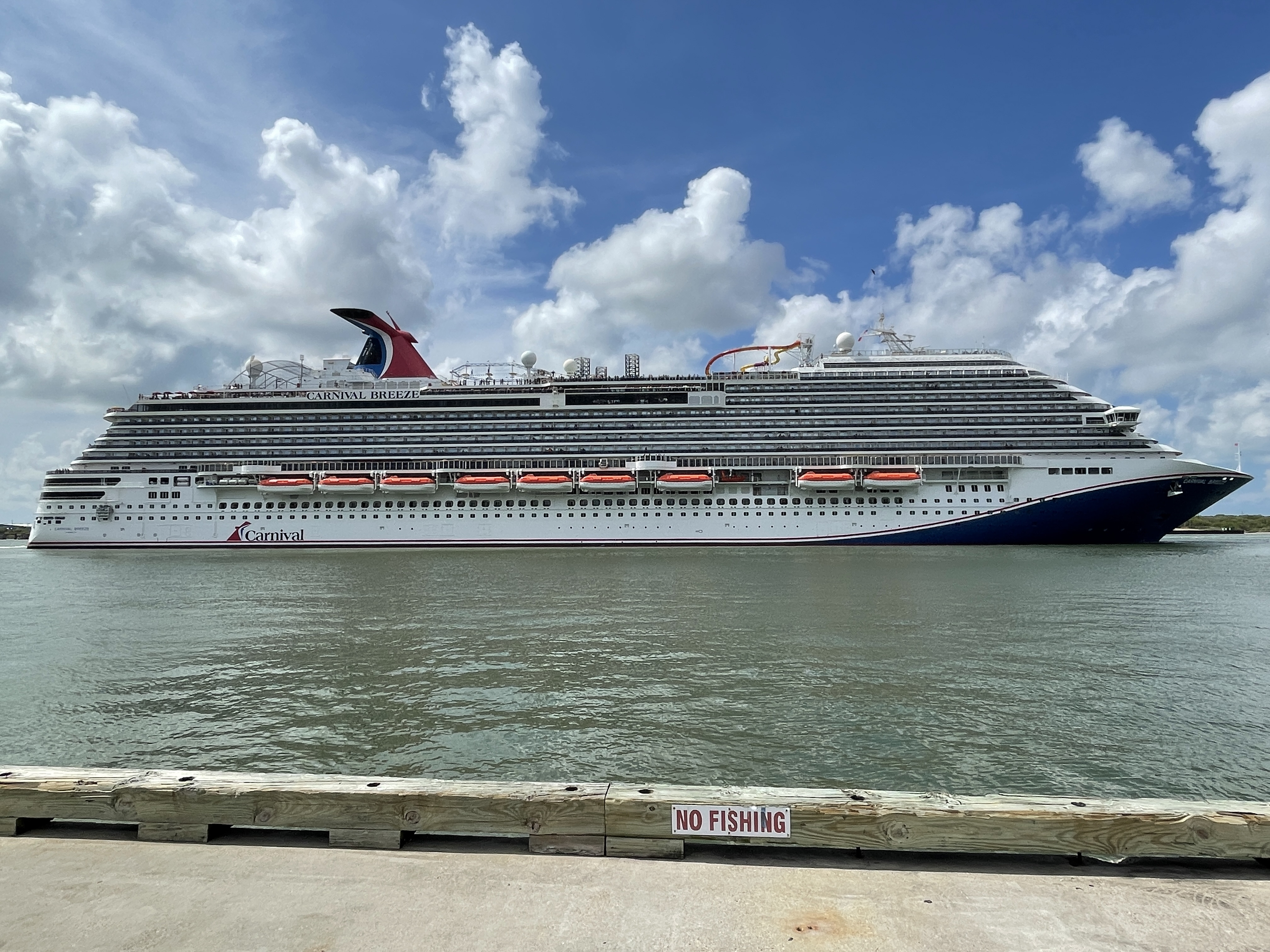
Carnival Breeze departing Galveston, Texas on 15 August 2022

During the coronavirus pandemic, on 9 May 2020, it was reported that a 29-year-old Hungarian crew member aboard Carnival Breeze had been found dead in his cabin, reportedly due to suicide. He was an assistant shore excursion manager, and was last seen with someone on 6 May 2020. A crew member blamed depression due to long periods of isolation aboard the ship, while others were shocked because things seemed normal with the crew member. A feature article in Bloomberg news in late December 2020 elaborated on the circumstances of his life and death, along with those of many other suspected suicides by cruise ship crewmembers during indefinite COVID quarantines during 2020. At the time, Carnival Breeze was crossing the Atlantic Ocean heading toward Southampton, England, to repatriate its European crew members.
