= Costa Diadema =

Cruise ship

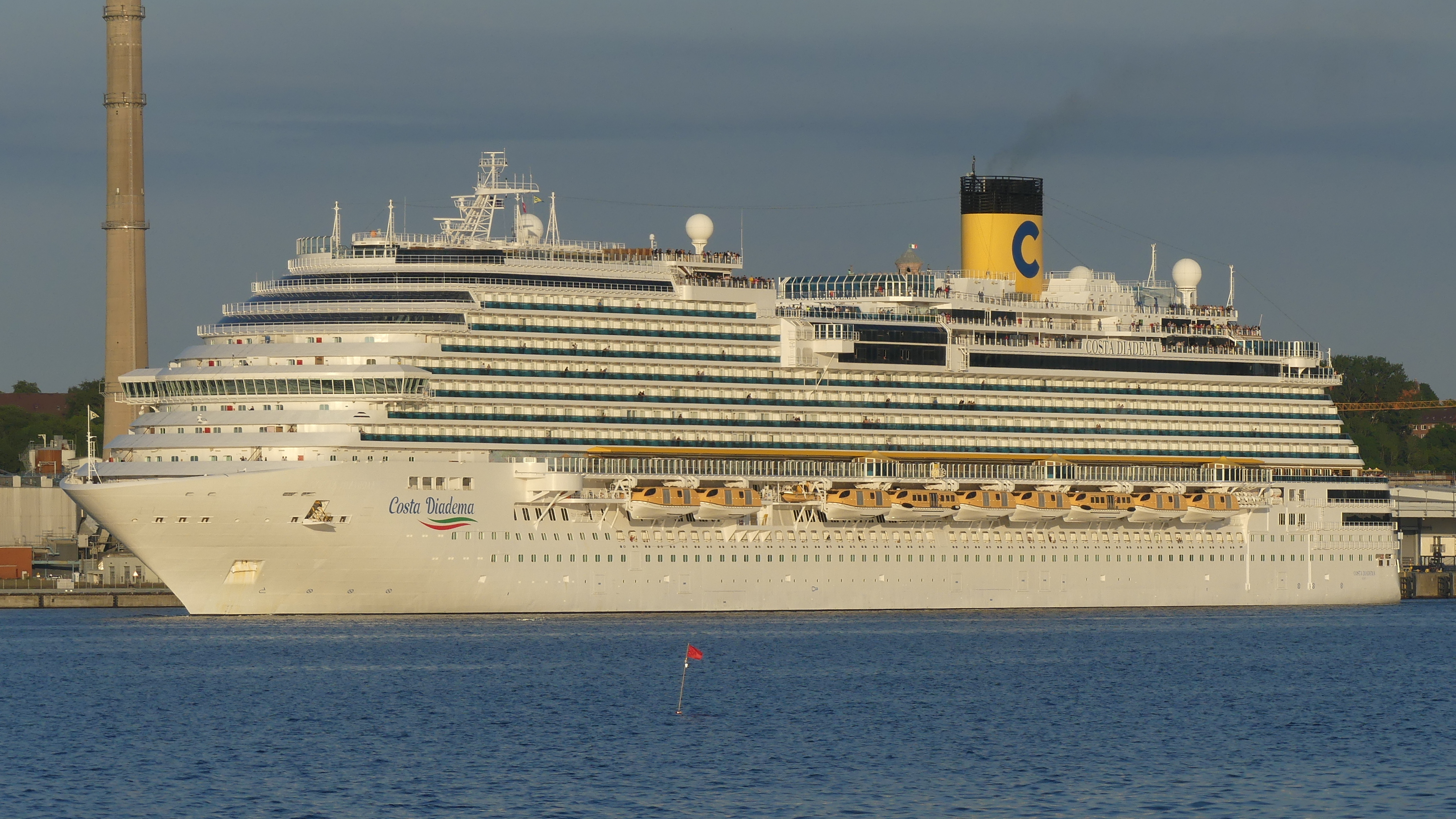
- Costa Diadema at Kiel, 2022

History

Italy
- Name: Costa Diadema
- Owner: Carnival Corporation
- Operator: Costa Cruises
- Port of registry: Genoa, Italy
- Ordered: 2012
- Builder: Fincantieri
- Cost: US$739 million
- Launched: 15 November 2013
- Christened: 7 November 2014
- Completed: 25 October 2014
- Acquired: 30 October 2014
- Maiden voyage: 1 November 2014
- In service: 8 November 2014
- Identification: Call sign: IBCX; IMO number: 9636888; MMSI number: 247353700
- Status: In service

General characteristics
- Class & type: Dream-class cruise ship
- Tonnage: 132,500 GT
- Length: 306 m (1,003 ft 11 in)
- Beam: 37.20 m (122 ft 1 in)
- Draught: 8.35 m (27 ft 5 in)
- Installed power: 4 × Wärtsilä 12V46; 2 × Wärtsilä 8L46; 67,200 kW (90,100 hp) (combined)
- Speed: 22.5 knots (41.7 km/h; 25.9 mph) max
- Capacity: 3,724 passengers (double occupancy); 4,927 passengers (maximum occupancy)
- Crew: 1,253

Costa Diadema is a Dream-class cruise ship owned by Carnival Corporation and operated by Costa Cruises. The ship was ordered in October 2012 and was delivered to Costa on 25 October 2014. At her time of delivery, Costa Diadema was the largest vessel to fly an Italian flag and was Costa's largest vessel at the time; she was formerly Costa Crociere's flagship being replaced by Costa Toscana in 2022.

== Design and engineering ==
Costa Diadema's 11 kV electrical generation system is provided from six generators, six aft/bow thruster electrical motors, HV main switchboard and distribution transformers, propulsion transformers, synchro drives, and motors from General Electric. The ship is also equipped with six Wärtsilä 12V46 engines that produce an output of 75,600 kW (101,400 hp).

Costa Diadema features a total of 1,862 cabins that can accommodate a maximum of 4,947 passengers and 1,253 crew members and also has an outside promenade extending over 500 m (1,600 ft). The ship includes three swimming pools, three dining areas, a 4D cinema hall, and a Saṃsāra spa across four decks.

== Construction and career ==
Costa Cruises ordered the Dream-class vessel in October 2012, making her the largest ship to be ordered and built for Costa. The ship cost Carnival Corporation US$739 million to build. She was ordered and built to replace the Costa Concordia, which sank earlier in the year.

Costa Diadema had her keel laid on 10 December 2012 at Fincantieri's shipyard in Marghera, marking the beginning of her hull assembly. She was launched on 15 November 2013, with an official ceremony performed by Franca Grasso, the ship's madrina at her launch. She was delivered on 25 October 2014 and performed a "Vernissage Cruise," from Trieste to Genoa on 1 November. Her naming ceremony was held on 7 November 2014 at the Port of Genoa, where she was officially christened by Italian travel agent, Carolina Micelli.

Costa Diadema spent her inaugural season and subsequent seasons cruising the Western Mediterranean until she was redeployed to Dubai in November 2018 to begin cruising the Persian Gulf for the winter season. As of 2019, she rotated between the Mediterranean in the spring and summer months and the Persian Gulf in the fall and winter months.

On 24 March 2020, the ship docked at Limassol, Cyprus, and a crew member suspected of suffering from the coronavirus was taken to hospital. Several other crew members were also reported to be ill. Costa Diadema was sailing from Dubai to Savona, Italy, without passengers.
