= Carnival Vista =

Cruise ship

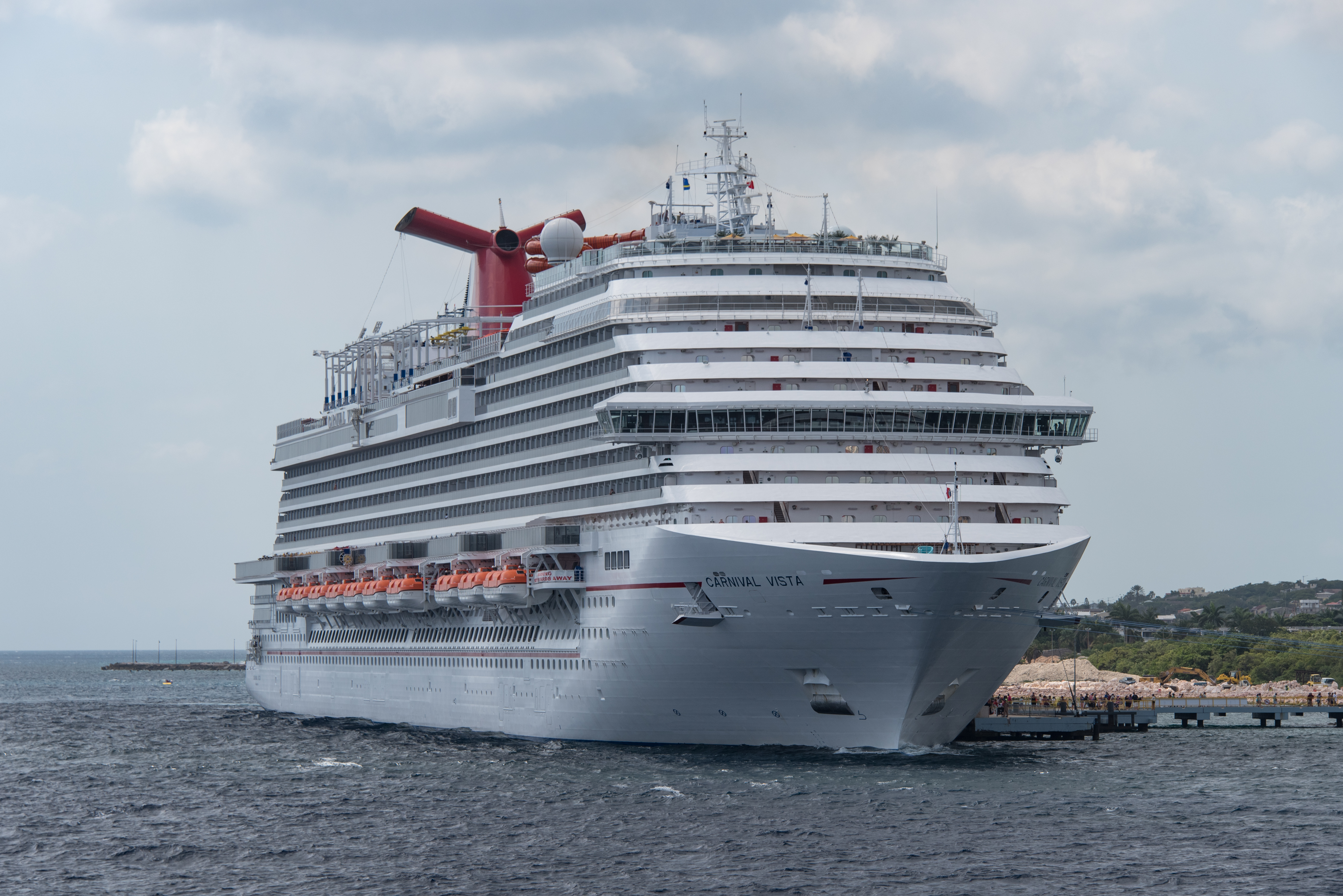
- Carnival Vista in Willemstad, 2017

History
- Name: Carnival Vista
- Owner: Carnival Corporation & plc
- Operator: Carnival Cruise Line
- Port of registry: Panama City, Panama
- Ordered: 2012
- Builder: Fincantieri, Monfalcone, Italy
- Cost: US$780 million
- Yard number: 6242
- Laid down: October 14, 2014
- Launched: June 25, 2015
- Acquired: April 28, 2016
- Maiden voyage: May 1, 2016
- In service: 2016–present
- Identification: Call sign: 3EMB9; IMO number: 9692569; MMSI number: 356883000

General characteristics
- Type: Vista-class cruise ship
- Tonnage: 133,596 GT
- Length: 323.63 m (1,061 ft 9 in)
- Beam: 37.2 m (122 ft 1 in) (waterline); 48.34 m (158 ft 7 in) (max)
- Draught: 8.55 m (28 ft 1 in)
- Depth: 11.2 m (36 ft 9 in)
- Decks: 15
- Installed power: MAN Diesel & Turbo 3x8L48/60CR + 2x14V48/60CR generating sets
- Propulsion: Diesel-electric; Two ABB Azipod XO units
- Speed: 18 knots (33 km/h; 21 mph)
- Capacity: 3,934 (double occupancy); 4,977 (max)
- Crew: 1,450

Carnival Vista is a cruise ship operated by Carnival Cruise Line. She is the lead ship of her namesake class, which includes two additional Carnival ships, Carnival Horizon and Carnival Panorama, as well as two Costa ships, Costa Venezia and Costa Firenze.

== History ==
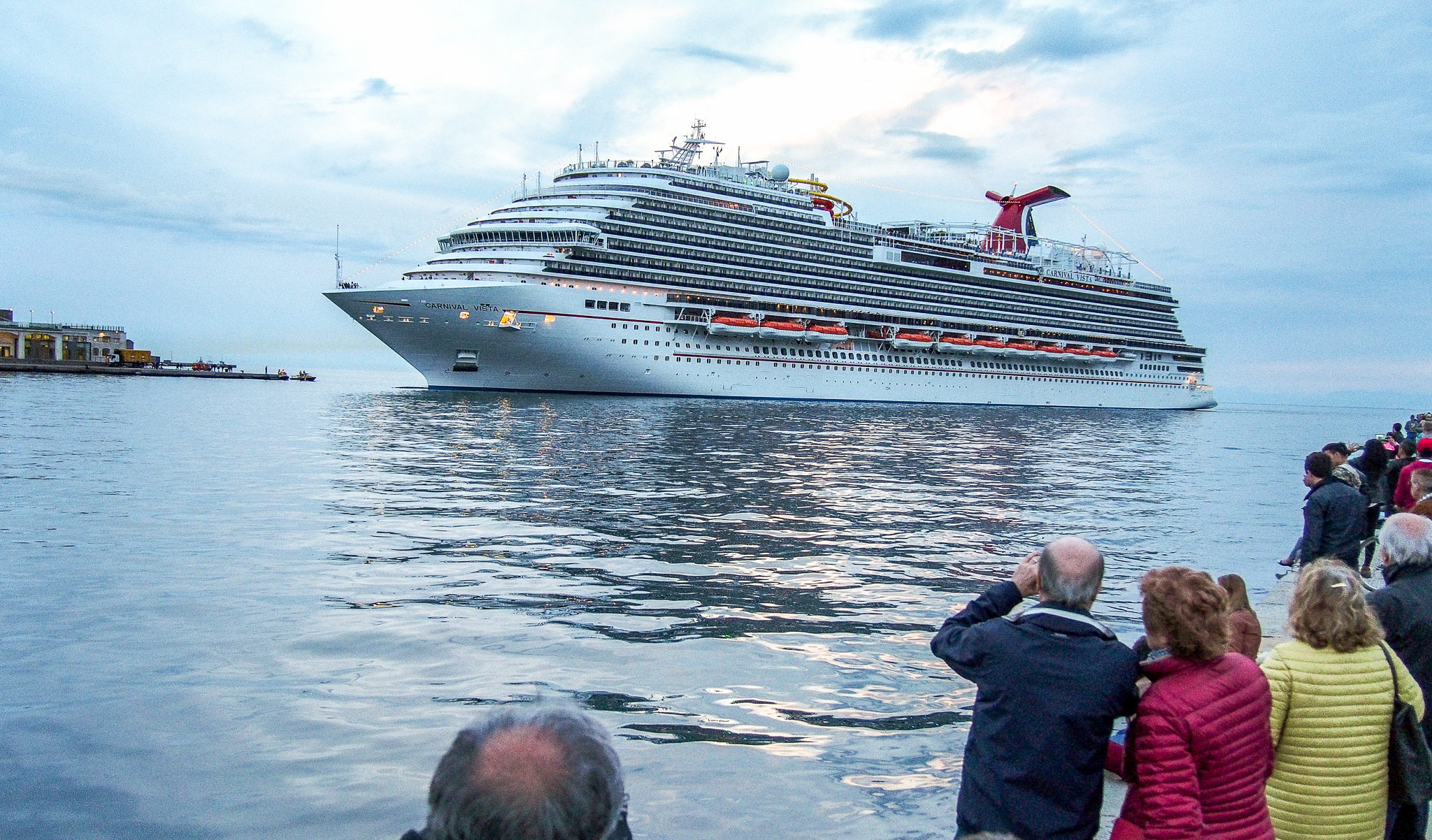
Carnival Vista on April 30, 2016.

The ship was delivered on April 28, 2016. Sea trials were completed in March 2016. The ship's maiden voyage embarked on May 1, 2016, from Trieste, Italy on a 13-day Europe Cruise that ended in Barcelona, Spain. Carnival Vista is the first ship in Carnival's Vista class. The ship was christened in New York City by its godmother, Miss USA 2016 Deshauna Barber.

On August 28, 2016, Carnival Vista's wake caused extensive damage to the tourist harbor of Marina del Nettuno, near Messina, Italy.

On June 21, 2019, it was announced by Carnival Cruise Line that three scheduled cruises would be cancelled due to performance issues with the ship's propulsion system. The heavy-lift ship BOKA Vanguard was used as a floating dry dock for repairs to the azipod propulsion system. This operation was selected over Grand Bahama Shipyard's drydocks after one of the shipyards cranes collapsed on Royal Caribbean's Oasis of the Seas.

== Design and construction ==
By gross tonnage, Carnival Vista was the largest ship within Carnival Cruise Line's fleet until the 2018-built Carnival Horizon, a sister ship to Carnival Vista. The ship was constructed in the Fincantieri shipyard of Monfalcone (Gorizia) and was delivered in April 2016. The first steel for the ship was cut in late February 2014, and the keel was laid in October 2014. The Carnival Vista's coin ceremony/float out was done in June 2015.

Carnival Vista was the first Carnival cruise ship fitted with ABB azipod propulsion units since the 2004-built Carnival Miracle.

In 2024, the ship got the new livery of the Carnival Cruise Line-company.

== Home port ==
From May to October 2016, Carnival Vista operated an inaugural season in the Mediterranean before repositioning to New York to offer a pair of cruises. She then moved to her new home-port in Miami, Florida, in November 2016 where she sailed year-round until September 2018 when she moved to Galveston, Texas. She offered six, seven, and eight day Caribbean cruises with ports of call such as Ocho Rios, Montego Bay, Grand Cayman, Cozumel, Aruba, Curaçao, and Bonaire.

Since moving to Galveston, Carnival Vista has offered two primary itineraries: Cozumel, Grand Cayman, and Montego Bay and an itinerary with calls in Cozumel, Belize, and Roatán.

Carnival Vista's homeport will move to Port Canaveral (Orlando, Florida) in November 2023. After transferring homeports, the Carnival Vista will be replaced by the upcoming Carnival Jubilee.

== Incidents ==
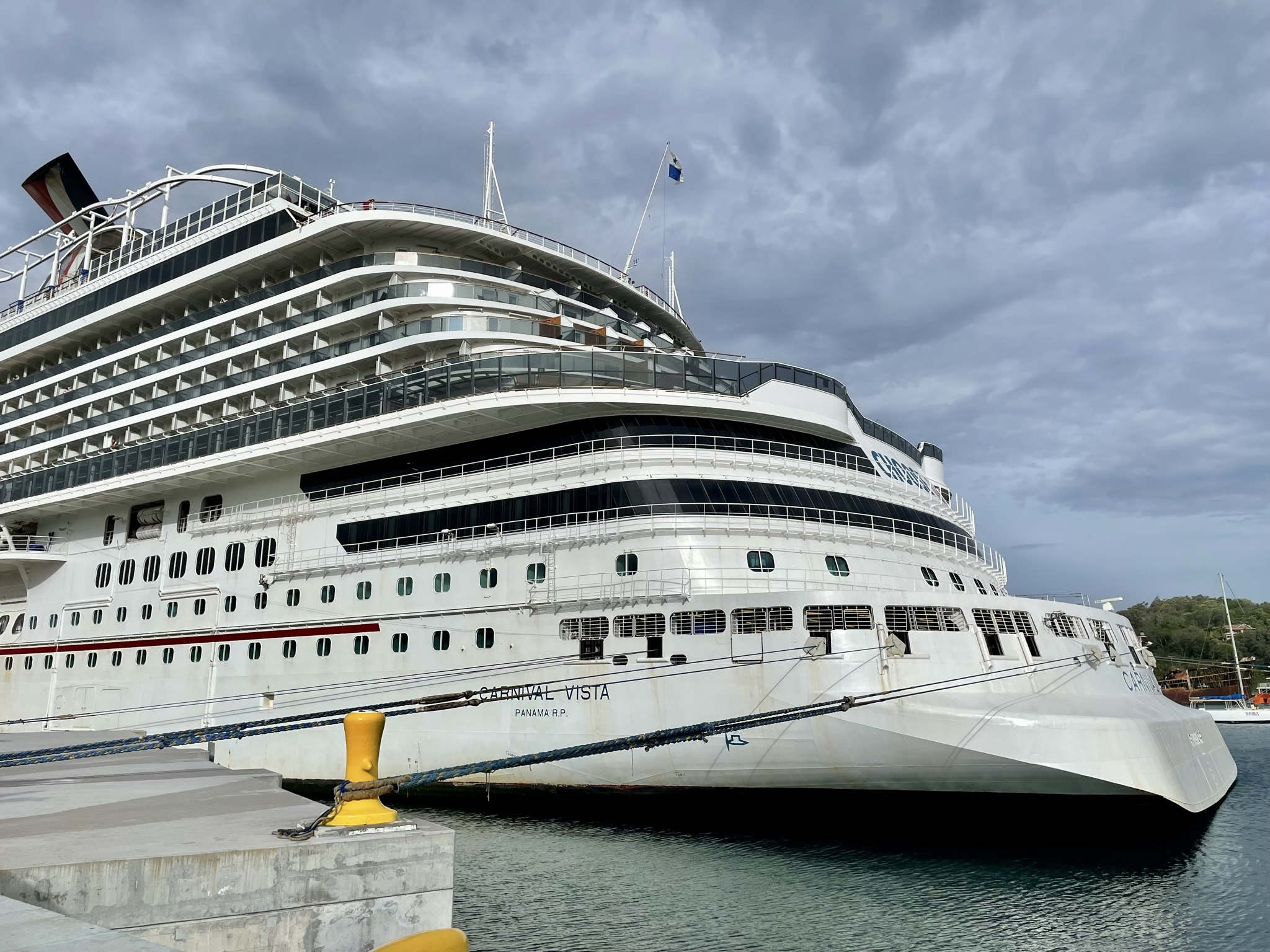
Carnival Vista in Mahogany Bay, Roatan, Honduras on June 21, 2022.

In July 2019, when the vessel was underway to its call in Galveston, it temporarily lost power in the middle of the Gulf of Mexico.

On 28 November 2019, seven passengers aboard Carnival Vista were on an independent bus tour in Belize when the bus crashed, resulting into two deaths and five injuries.

On 6 March 2020, a man was charged in the alleged assault of a teenage boy aboard the ship.

The ship was reported to have propulsion issues again in August 2024.

=== Coronavirus pandemic ===
During the COVID-19 pandemic, the CDC reported, as early as 22 April 2020, that at least one person who tested for SARS-CoV-2 had tested positive within 14 days post-disembarkation.
