= Carnival Horizon =

2018 Vista-class cruise ship

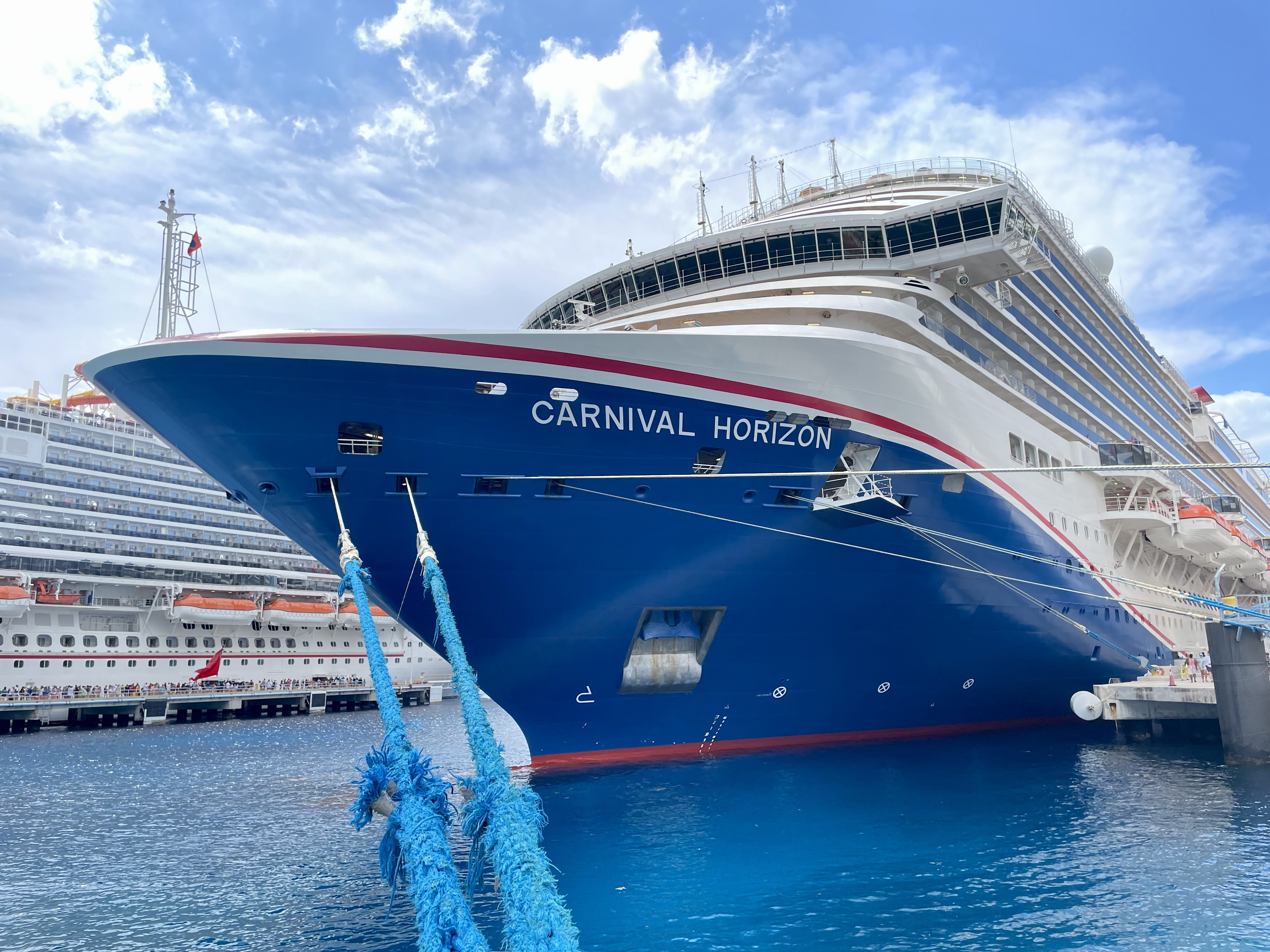
- Carnival Horizon docked in Cozumel, 2022

History

Panama
- Name: Carnival Horizon
- Owner: Carnival Corporation
- Operator: Carnival Cruise Line
- Port of registry: Panama
- Ordered: December 19, 2014
- Builder: Fincantieri, Marghera
- Yard number: 6243
- Laid down: April 2016
- Launched: March 10, 2017
- Sponsored by: Queen Latifah
- Christened: May 23, 2018
- Maiden voyage: April 2, 2018
- In service: 2018–present
- Identification: Call sign: H3WI; IMO number: 9767091; MMSI number: 370039000
- Status: In service

General characteristics
- Class & type: Vista-class cruise ship
- Tonnage: 133,596 GT; 12,164 DWT
- Length: 323.63 m (1,061.8 ft)
- Beam: 37.2 m (122 ft) (waterline); 48.16 m (158.0 ft) (max)
- Draught: 8.2 m (27 ft)
- Depth: 14.1 m (46 ft)
- Decks: 15 passenger decks
- Installed power: MAN Diesel & Turbo 3x8L48/60CR + 2x14V48/60CR generating sets
- Propulsion: Diesel-electric; Two ABB AzipodXO units
- Speed: 21.5 kn (39.8 km/h; 24.7 mph)
- Capacity: 3,960 passengers (double occupancy); 4,977 (maximum)
- Crew: 1,450

Carnival Horizon is a Vista-class cruise ship operated by Carnival Cruise Line. She is the 26th vessel in the Carnival fleet and is the second of Carnival's Vista class, which includes Carnival Vista and Carnival Panorama.

The ship has a tonnage of 133,596 GT and a capacity of 3,960 passengers. In 2019, she and her sister ship, Carnival Vista, were both superseded as the largest Carnival ship by their sister, the 133,868 GT Carnival Panorama.

== History ==
=== Planning and construction ===
On December 19, 2014, Carnival Corporation announced a new order with Fincantieri for a second Vista-class ship to be similarly designed to her sister ship, Carnival Vista, making her the 26th vessel in the fleet.

On July 29, 2016, Carnival announced the name of its second Vista-class vessel as Carnival Horizon. Construction of the ship took 30 months, which included the steel cutting in March 2015, the keel laying in April 2016, and the sea trials in November 2017.

=== Delivery and christening ===
On March 28, 2018, Fincantieri delivered Carnival Horizon to Carnival Cruise Line.

On March 1, 2018, Carnival announced Queen Latifah as the godmother of Carnival Horizon. She christened the vessel on May 23, 2018, upon her arrival in New York City from a 14-day transatlantic crossing.

== Itinerary ==
Carnival Horizon embarked on her maiden voyage on April 2, 2018, from Barcelona for a 13-day Mediterranean sailing, visiting ports of call in Italy, Croatia, Greece, and Malta. The ship continued a series of cruises for a short season in the Mediterranean before re-positioning to New York City in May for the remainder of summer 2018. From New York, she operated sailings to the Caribbean and Bermuda before re-positioning to Miami in September, where she offers year-round six-night cruises to the Western Caribbean and eight-night cruises to the Eastern and Southern Caribbean.

== Incidents ==
On November 15, 2019, a passenger fell four stories off a balcony to his death from a lower deck of the ship just as it was returning to Miami. The medical staff on board the ship responded to the incident; however, they could not revive him. According to the medical examiner's office, it was revealed that the passenger's death was due to blunt force trauma and not a suicide.

On March 16, 2022, a male passenger jumped from the 11th deck into the water around 19:00 after departing Grand Turk in the Turks and Caicos. The ship immediately initiated search and rescue procedures. The United States Coast Guard was notified and the body of the passenger was located at approximately 21:00.

On November 8, 2025, the body of 18-year old Anna Kepner was found under a bed rolled in a blanket and concealed by life vests. She had boarded the vessel along with her father, stepmother and two step-siblings (a 16-year-old male and 9-year-old female) on November 2; the ship was departing Miami, for a six day Caribbean cruise. The FBI informed the family that the 16-year-old male may be implicated for Anna's death. Preliminary findings suggest the cause of death was asphyxiation from an arm across her neck.
