= Vista-class cruise ship =

Vista-class cruise ship may refer to two classes of cruise ships owned by Carnival Corporation & plc:

- Vista-class cruise ship (2002)
- Vista-class cruise ship (2016)
