= Killing of Anna Kepner =

Cruise ship femicide case in 2025

Murder of Anna Kepner
- Date: November 6, 2025
- Type: Homicide by mechanical asphyxiation
- Deaths: Anna Kepner
- Arrests: Timothy Hudson

The killing of Anna Marie Kepner occurred on November 6, 2025, during a cruise aboard Carnival Horizon with her family members.

== Background ==
Kepner was from Titusville, Florida. She was a cheerleader at Temple Christian School. Kepner's grandparents stated that she and her stepbrother were very close. At the time of her killing, she was 18 years old. Kepner had previously expressed discomfort around her stepbrother, with her ex-boyfriend claiming that her stepbrother tried to climb on top of her while she lay down.

== Death ==
On November 2, 2025, Kepner boarded the Carnival Horizon in Miami, Florida with her family, including her father (Christopher Kepner), her paternal grandparents, her 14-year old half-brother and 10-year old half-sister, her stepmother, (Shauntel Hudson), her stepbrother, and a 9-year-old stepsister. The sailing was planned to be 6 nights, with ports of call in George Town, Grand Cayman, Ocho Rios, Jamaica, and Cozumel, Mexico. Kepner, who was 18, was sharing a room with her stepbrother, who was 16.

Kepner was killed via mechanical asphyxiation on November 7. On November 8, Kepner's body was found by a cabin steward at 11:17 am, wrapped in a blanket under a bed and concealed by life vests. Family members said her stepbrother was "an emotional mess" after Kepner's body was discovered. He reportedly told investigators and family members he could not remember anything.

The vessel returned to Miami on November 8, as originally planned per its itinerary. Following their arrival in Miami, Anna Kepner's stepbrother was hospitalized for psychiatric observation and was later released to one of Shauntel's relatives. The death was investigated by the Federal Bureau of Investigation and was ruled a homicide. Bruising was present on Kepner's neck, suggesting an arm had been held across her neck. A memorial service for Kepner was held on November 20, and attendees were encouraged to wear bright colors, "in honor of Anna's bright and beautiful soul."

== Legal proceedings ==
Shauntel Hudson and Thomas Hudson, the father of Anna Kepner's stepbrother, Timothy, were engaged in an ongoing custody battle. On November 17, Shauntel requested an emergency delay in the hearing, as one of her minor children may be considered a suspect in the incident. On December 5, a federal judge in Brevard County, Florida, stated that the stepbrother was considered a suspect during a custody hearing.

On February 6, 2026, Kepner's stepbrother, Timothy Hudson appeared before a federal magistrate. The case was sealed, and charges were not publicly released. He was represented by a federal public defender.

On April 13, 2026, Kepner's stepbrother was indicted by a federal grand jury on charges of murder and aggravated sexual abuse. The indictment was unsealed by U.S. District Judge Beth Bloom as the stepbrother will be tried as an adult.

On June 15, 2026, a judge ruled that Hudson would be held in custody before and during his trial because the prosecution's "case for a forcible rape is beyond clear and convincing," and "suggests a level of psychopathy and lack of remorse that by itself raises a serious concern that [Hudson] can snap at any time, despite the well-meaning and serious efforts of his caretakers to make sure that does not happen."
