= Responses to the COVID-19 pandemic in August 2021 =

Aspect of viral disease pandemic

This article documents the chronology of the response to the COVID-19 pandemic in August 2021, which originated in Wuhan, China in December 2019. Some developments may become known or fully understood only in retrospect. Reporting on this pandemic began in December 2019.

== Reactions and measures in Africa ==
=== 8 August ===
- Zimbabwe starts offering vaccines to tourists.

== Reactions and measures in the Americas ==
Cities, provinces, and states throughout North America are now only permitting certain non-essential activities for individuals who provide proof of full vaccination. New York City introduced a “vaccine passport” for non-essential activities beginning 17 August.

=== 10 August ===
- Due to concerns over the SARS-CoV-2 Delta variant and increasing infections in California, the Academy of Television Arts & Sciences announces that the 73rd Primetime Emmy Awards and its corresponding Creative Arts ceremony would be relocated from the Microsoft Theater to the adjacent indoor-outdoor Event Deck at L.A. Live, and have a further reduction in attendance.

== Reactions and measures in the Eastern Mediterranean ==
=== 8 August ===
- Israeli Prime Minister Naftali Bennett has approved a plan by the education, health and defense ministries and the Prime Minister's Office to reopen schools in September with the following provisions including serology testing for grades 1–6 students, providing kindergarten and primary school age children with a rapid COVID-19 home test kit, testing pupils if their classmates test positive, and increased testing for students in "orange" and "red" zones.

=== 29 August ===
- UAE starts to allow travel for vaccinated travelers.

== Reactions and measures in Europe ==
=== 11 August ===
- The developers of the Sputnik V vaccine have offered its 'Sputnik Light' vaccine to Pfizer for trial against the Delta variant.

== Reactions and measures in South, East and Southeast Asia ==
=== 5 August ===
- South Korea pledged 2 billion USD to become a large COVID vaccine producer.

=== 15 August ===
- The Malaysian Government has announced that several businesses including wet markets, barbers and car washes will be allowed to reopen in areas under phase 1 on the national recovery plan.

=== 16 August ===
- In Malaysia, the Minister in charge of COVID-19 affairs in the state of Sabah Masidi Manjun announced that Sabah's construction, manufacturing, mining and quarry sectors with at least 80% of workers vaccinated would be reallowed to reopen. Manjun also announced that companies within these sectors, with 60% to 79% of their manpower vaccinated, would also be allowed to operate at 80% capacity. The reopening of these sectors is part of the second phase of the Malaysian Government's National Recovery Plan.

=== 19 August ===
- Singapore plans to allow fully vaccinated travelers to enter the country without quarantine. starting with Germany.

== Reactions and measures in the Western Pacific ==
=== 2 August ===
- New Zealand Prime Minister Jacinda Ardern has announced that seasonal workers from Tonga, Samoa and Vanuatu will be allowed to enter the country without having to go into managed isolation from September 2021 onwards.

=== 11 August ===
- New Zealand's Strategic Covid-19 Public Health Advisory Group has advocated reopening the country's borders in phases including easing managed isolation requirements for certain travellers, pre-departure testing, and rapid testing.
- The New Zealand Government has designated Fiji and Indonesia as "very high risk" countries, restricting travel to New Zealand citizens, their partners and children, and parents of dependent children who are New Zealand citizens.

=== 12 August ===
- New Zealand Prime Minister Ardern has confirmed that the country would continue its elimination strategy indefinitely with plans. As part of a "phased reopening" of the country, the Government plans to boost its vaccine rollout efforts and allow vaccinated travellers from low-risk countries to bypass quarantine.

=== 17 August ===
- New Zealand Prime Minister Ardern has announced that New Zealand would move to Alert Level 4 at 11:59 pm. Under Alert Level 4, people are required to stay at home except for exercises and to access essential services like supermarkets, dairies, and healthcare. The country is expected to be at Level 4 for a minimum of three days, while Auckland and the Coromandel Peninsula remain on Level 4 for seven days.

=== 18 August ===
- New Zealand Prime Minister Ardern has announced that anyone above the age of 12 years old must wear face masks at essential services such as supermarkets, pharmacies, dairies, service stations, public transportation and taxies from 11:59pm on 18 August. She described wearing a mask as "an act of care to the people around you."

=== 20 August ===
- New Zealand Prime Minister Ardern has announced that New Zealand will remain on an Alert Level 4 lockdown until at least 11:59 pm on 24 August in response to new community cases in Auckland and Wellington.

=== 22 August ===
- The New Zealand Government has announced that record-keeping including scanning with the NZ COVID Tracer app or manual signing will now be mandatory for most events and businesses at all alert levels in response to the detection of the Delta variant within the community earlier in the week.

=== 23 August ===
- New Zealand Prime Minister Ardern has announced that most of New Zealand will remain on Alert Level 4 until 11:59 pm on 27 August while Auckland will remain on Alert Level 4 until 11:59 pm on 31 August. Alert level settings for most of New Zealand will be reviewed on 27 August while alert level settings for Auckland will be reviewed on 30 August.

=== 27 August ===
- New Zealand Prime Minister Ardern has announced that the country will remain on Alert Level 4 until 11:59 pm on 31 August. While Auckland and the Northland Region will remain on Alert Level 4 for at least two more weeks, the rest of the country will move into Alert Level 3 from 1 September 2021.

=== 29 August ===
- Japan has suspended the use of the Moderna vaccine following the deaths of two people, citing contamination fears.

=== 30 August ===
- The New Zealand Government has hinted that Northland's alert level could be lowered to Alert Level 3 at 11:59 pm on 2 September 2021 if wastewater testing confirms no traces of COVID-19.

== See also ==
- Timeline of the COVID-19 pandemic in August 2021
- Responses to the COVID-19 pandemic
