= Vista-class cruise ship (2016) =

Class of cruise ship

- Carnival Horizon docked in Amber Cove in Dominican Republic on 2 June 2023

Class overview
- Builders: Fincantieri, Italy; Shanghai Waigaoqiao Shipbuilding
- Operators: Carnival Cruise Line (2016–present); Costa Cruises (2019–2024); Adora Cruises (2023–present)
- Preceded by: Dream class
- Succeeded by: Excellence class
- Subclasses: Venice class
- Built: 2014–2026 (planned)
- In service: 2016–present
- Planned: 7
- Building: 1
- Completed: 6
- Active: 6

General characteristics
- Type: Cruise ship
- Tonnage: 133,500 GT
- Length: 1,060–1,062 ft (323–324 m)
- Beam: 122 ft (37 m); 158 ft (48 m) at pool decks
- Draft: 27 ft (8.2 m)
- Decks: 15
- Installed power: MAN Diesel & Turbo 3 × 8L48/60CR + 2 × 14V48/60CR generating sets
- Propulsion: Diesel-electric; Two ABB Azipod XO units
- Speed: 23 knots (43 km/h; 26 mph)
- Capacity: 3,936 passengers (double occupancy)
- Crew: 1,450

The Vista class is a class of cruise ships built by Fincantieri in Italy. The ships are operated by the Carnival Cruise Line and Adora Cruises divisions of Carnival Corporation & plc. The class design is based on Carnival's Dream class, but with a different stern and main atrium. The length was increased an additional 56–58 feet (17–18 m) on the Vista-class ships, compared to the Dream class.

== History ==
Carnival Vista was constructed in the Fincantieri shipyard of Monfalcone (Gorizia) and was delivered in April 2016. The first steel for the ship was cut in late February 2014, and the keel was laid in October 2014. The Carnival Vista coin ceremony/float out was done in June 2015, with the ship being delivered on 28 April 2016. Carnival Vista features outdoor spots like Havana Bar & Pool, a ropes course, mini golf, Skyride at SportSquare (an 800 ft, 240 m-long track suspended around its top deck that passengers can circle in pedal-powered capsules), and Seafood Shack plus additional spaces like the first IMAX at sea. Carnival Vista has custom Cuban-themed staterooms and new Family Harbor staterooms. The Clubhouse features indoor activities like mini-bowling and arcade-style basketball, soccer, volleyball, and table tennis. The ship also has SkyGreens, a mini golf course on Deck 12.

The second Vista-class ship, Carnival Horizon, was delivered to Carnival in March 2018. Like Carnival Vista, Carnival Horizon features SkyRide, an IMAX Theatre, a Water Works aqua park which is themed after Dr. Seuss characters, and Carnival's Seuss at Sea programme. She also has some unique new attractions such as Bonsai Teppanyaki and Guy's Pig & Anchor Bar-B-Que Smokehouse/Brewhouse.

In 2019 and 2020 Fincantieri was expected to deliver one ship to P&O Cruises Australia and two ships for Costa Crociere, however, on 15 December 2016 Carnival Corporation announced that the ship that was to set sail for P&O Cruises Australia in 2019 would now be sailing for Carnival Cruise Line. P&O was then set to receive a retrofitted Carnival Splendor instead, however in September 2017, it was announced that Carnival Splendor would stay in the Carnival fleet and P&O Cruises Australia would get Princess Cruises Golden Princess in 2020.

Two more future ships were planned to be built at China State Shipbuilding Corporation and were due to be delivered from 2022 to CSSC Carnival Cruise Shipping. There are options for four more ships.

The third Vista-class ship, Carnival Panorama, was announced on 1 December 2017. Unlike her Carnival sisters Carnival Vista and Carnival Horizon, Carnival Panorama replaced the IMAX theater with an indoor SkyZone trampoline park. She made her maiden voyage as the Carnival flagship on 11 December 2019 from her homeport in Long Beach, California. Vanna White serves as the ship's godmother.

Costa Venezia and Costa Firenze were planned to join the Carnival Cruise Line fleet under a newly created joint concept with Costa Crociere named Costa by Carnival. Carnival Venezia was assigned to homeport at New York City, New York, starting in 2023 and Carnival Firenze homeports at Long Beach, California in 2024. In December 2022, Carnival announced that these two ships will be known as the Venice class.

== Ships ==
| Ship | In service | Gross tonnage | Builder | Baseport | Flag | Notes | Image |
Carnival Cruise Line
| Carnival Vista | 2016–present | 133,596 GT | Fincantieri, Monfalcone | Port Canaveral, Florida | Panama | First Vista-class ship; Tied with Carnival Horizon as largest Carnival ship until 2019 | |
| Carnival Horizon | 2018–present | 133,596 GT | Fincantieri, Marghera | Miami, Florida | Panama | | |
| Carnival Panorama | 2019–present | 133,868 GT | Fincantieri, Marghera | * Long Beach, California | Panama | Originally destined for P&O Cruises Australia but was transferred during construction | |
| Carnival Venezia | 2019–present | 135,225 GT | Fincantieri, Monfalcone | New York City, New York (2023); Port Canaveral (late 2024–Spring 2025) | Bahamas | Ship designated for Costa's China fleet keel laid on 1 November 2017. Floated out on 22 June 2018. In service for Carnival, under the Carnival Fun Italian Style concept. | |
| Carnival Firenze | 2021–present | 135,156 GT | Fincantieri, Marghera | Long Beach, California | Panama | Ship designated for Costa's China fleet construction started on 25 May 2018 launched on 6 November 2019 In service for Carnival, under the Carnival Fun Italian Style concept. | |
Adora Cruises
| Adora Magic City | 2023 | 135,500 GT | CSSC, Shanghai Waigaoqiao Shipbuilding|: Shanghai, China | Panama | Construction started on 18 October 2019. Keel laid on 10 November 2020. Launched on 17 December 2021. | | |
| Adora Flora City | 2026 | 142,000 GT | CSSC, Shanghai Waigaoqiao Shipbuilding|: Guangzhou, China | | Bigger than the other ships of the class; 341 m (1,118 ft 9 in) long. Construction started on 8 August 2022. Keel laid on 20 April 2024. Launched in April 2025. | | |
