= Carnival Firenze =

Cruise ship

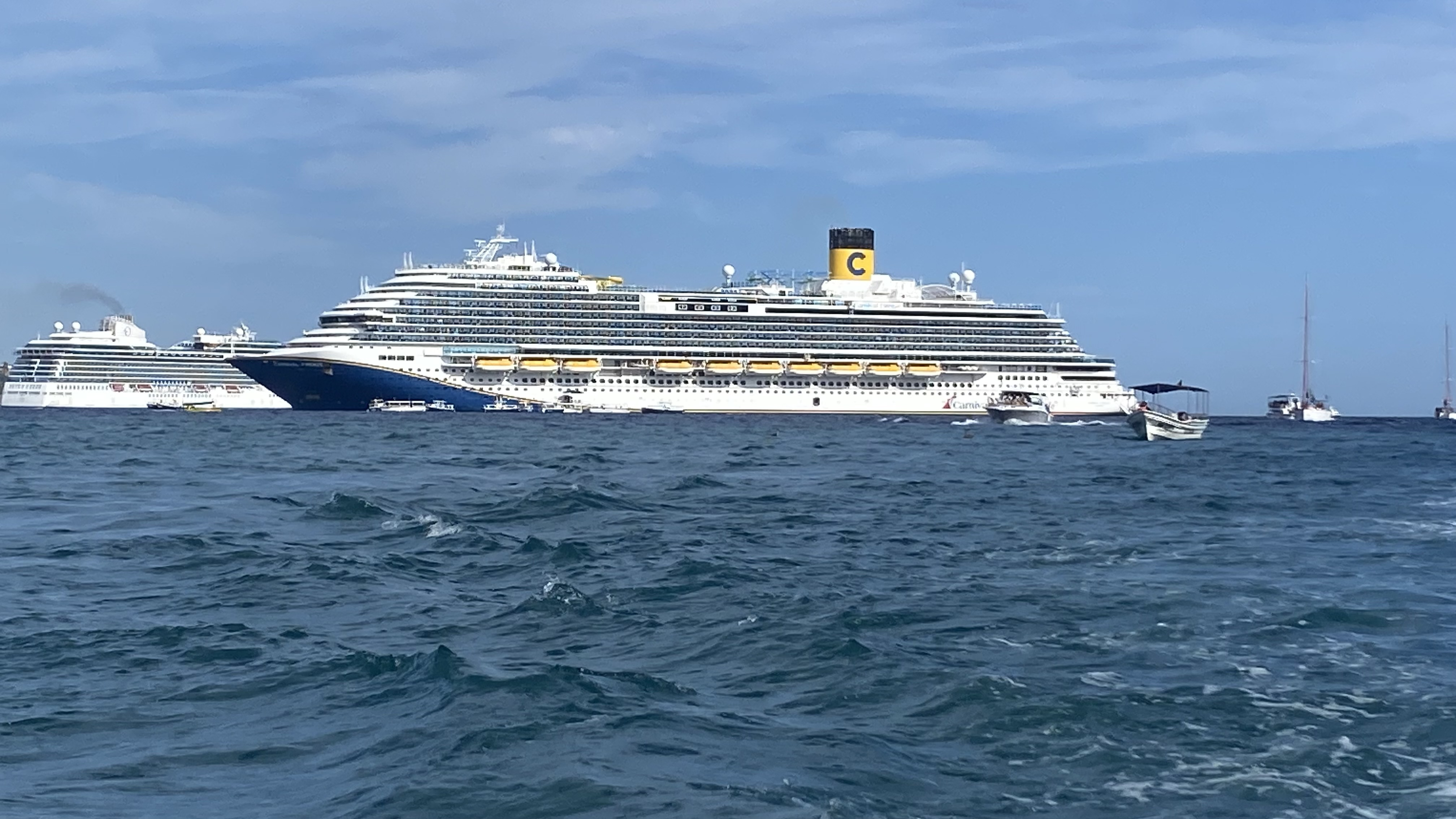
- Carnival Firenze in Cabo San Lucas, Baja California Sur, Mexico, 2025

History

Panama
- Name: Costa Firenze (2020–2024); Carnival Firenze (2024–present)
- Namesake: Florence, Italy
- Owner: Carnival Corporation
- Operator: Costa Cruises (2020–2024); Carnival Cruise Line (2024–present)
- Port of registry: Genoa, Italy (2020–2024); Panama (2024–present)
- Route: Mexican Riviera, Catalina–Ensenada
- Ordered: 1 April 2016
- Builder: Fincantieri, Marghera, Italy
- Yard number: 6273
- Laid down: 22 December 2015
- Launched: 6 November 2019
- Sponsored by: Jonathan Bennett (Carnival Firenze)
- Christened: 24 April 2024 (Carnival Firenze)
- Completed: 22 December 2020
- Acquired: 22 December 2020 (Costa Firenze); 2 February 2024 (Carnival Firenze)
- Maiden voyage: 4 July 2021 (Costa Firenze); 25 April 2024 (Carnival Firenze)
- In service: 2021–present
- Home port: Long Beach, California
- Identification: IMO number: 9801691; Call sign: 3E5193 (from 2024); MMSI number: 352003546 (from 2024)
- Status: In service

General characteristics
- Class & type: Vista-class cruise ship
- Tonnage: 135,156 GT
- Length: 323.63 m (1,061 ft 9 in)
- Beam: 37.2 m (122 ft 1 in)
- Draught: 8.25 m (27 ft 1 in)
- Depth: 11.2 m (36 ft 9 in)
- Decks: 18
- Installed power: 2 × MAN 14V48/60 CR kW; + 3 × MAN 8L48/60 CR kW; Total Installed Power: 62,400 kW (83,700 hp)
- Propulsion: 33,000 kW (44,000 hp)
- Speed: 18 knots (33 km/h; 21 mph) (service)
- Capacity: 4,208 (double occupancy); 5,260 (max)
- Crew: 1,278 crew

Carnival Firenze is a Vista-class cruise ship operated by Carnival Cruise Line. Originally debuting as Costa Firenze for sister brand Costa Cruises, she was initially commissioned for the Chinese market but was never deployed to Asia following the impact of the COVID-19 pandemic on cruise travel in China. Named after Florence, the 135,156 gross tonnage (GT)-vessel was constructed by Italian shipbuilder Fincantieri in Marghera and delivered in December 2020.

In 2023, amid a corporate fleet reshuffling in the wake of the pandemic, Carnival Corporation announced Costa Firenze would be transferred to Carnival under a new concept branded "Carnival Fun Italian Style". The new concept was designed to integrate Costa Firenze and sister ship Costa Venezia into Carnival in a bid to boost domestic American capacity after the cruise line had sold numerous older vessels, and while Costa contended with operational challenges in its core markets. In February 2024, she was officially renamed Carnival Firenze during her pre-delivery renovation and debuted for Carnival in April 2024 in the new sub-fleet of Venice-class ships.

== Planning and construction (2015–2020) ==
Carnival Corporation entered into a strategic agreement with Italian shipbuilder Fincantieri in March 2015 for five cruise ships to be delivered between 2019 and 2022. On 30 December 2015, Carnival Corporation and Fincantieri signed a memorandum of agreement for four cruise ships, with two then-unnamed ships for Costa Asia among the four. The announcement coincided with Carnival Corporation's unveiling of its plans for the expansion of the Costa Asia fleet, which would consist of two vessels at 135,500 GT each, with a capacity of approximately 4,200 passengers per vessel. The contracts for the two newbuild vessels were finalized in April 2016. The two ships, comprising a new class of vessels in Costa's fleet, were designed to be sister ships and be outfitted with Costa's Italian-inspired decor.

In June 2018, it was revealed that construction on the ship had begun with the steel cutting that was performed earlier that year. On 6 May 2019, Costa Cruises announced that the second of the two vessels built specifically for the Chinese market would be named Costa Firenze, after the Italian city of Florence, and have interior features inspired by Florentine history and culture. The ship was floated out from the building dock at Marghera on 6 November 2019.

Delivery for Costa Firenze was originally scheduled for 30 September 2020 but, amid the COVID-19 pandemic, it was later postponed to 22 December.

=== Design ===
Carnival Firenze measures 135,156 gross tonnage (GT), has a length of 323.63 metres (1,061 ft 9 in), a draught of 8.25 metres (27 ft 1 in), and a beam of 37.2 metres (122 ft 1 in). She is powered by a diesel-electric system, with two MAN 14V48 engines and three MAN 8L48 gensets, all of which run on a common rail system and produce a total output of 62,400 kilowatts (83,700 hp). The propulsion system produces a total of 33,000 kilowatts (44,000 hp). The combination gives the vessel a service speed of 18 knots (33 km/h; 21 mph) and a maximum speed of 22.6 knots (41.9 km/h; 26.0 mph). The ship houses 2,136 passenger cabins and 701 crew cabins and has a maximum capacity of 6,538 passengers and crew.

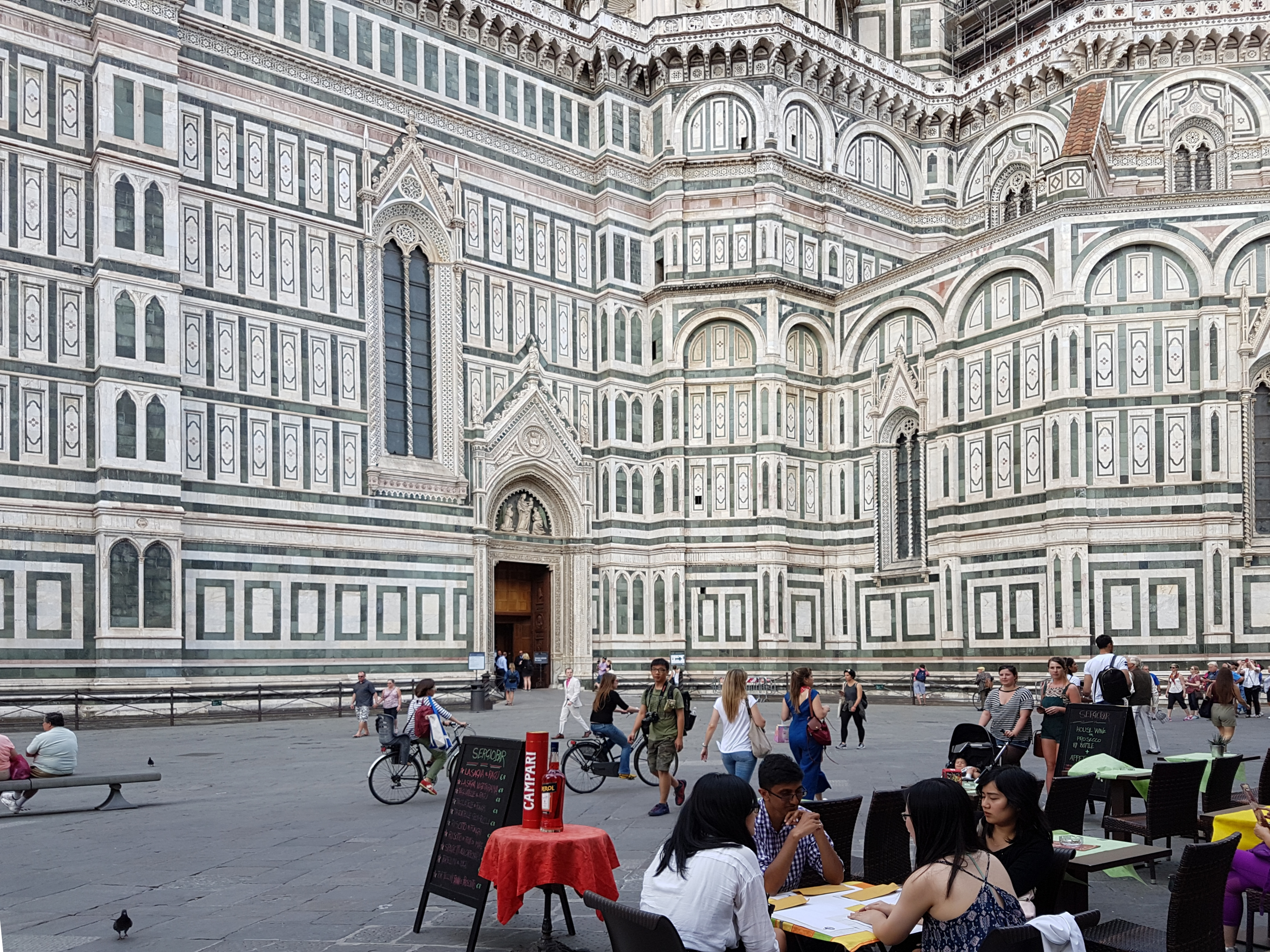
Decor in the dining spaces on board the ship was inspired by Florentine landmarks, such as the Piazza del Duomo.

Costa commissioned design firm YSA Design for the vessel's Florentine-inspired interior decor. The firm focused on the history of Florence in the ship's dining spaces, with influences including the Piazza del Duomo, Florence Cathedral, Palazzo Vecchio, and Palazzo Pitti, in addition to the use of velvet, marble flooring, and gilding work for further emphasis. Lounges were inspired by the Tuscan countryside setting and styles of Italian fashion.

== Costa Cruises (2020–2024) ==
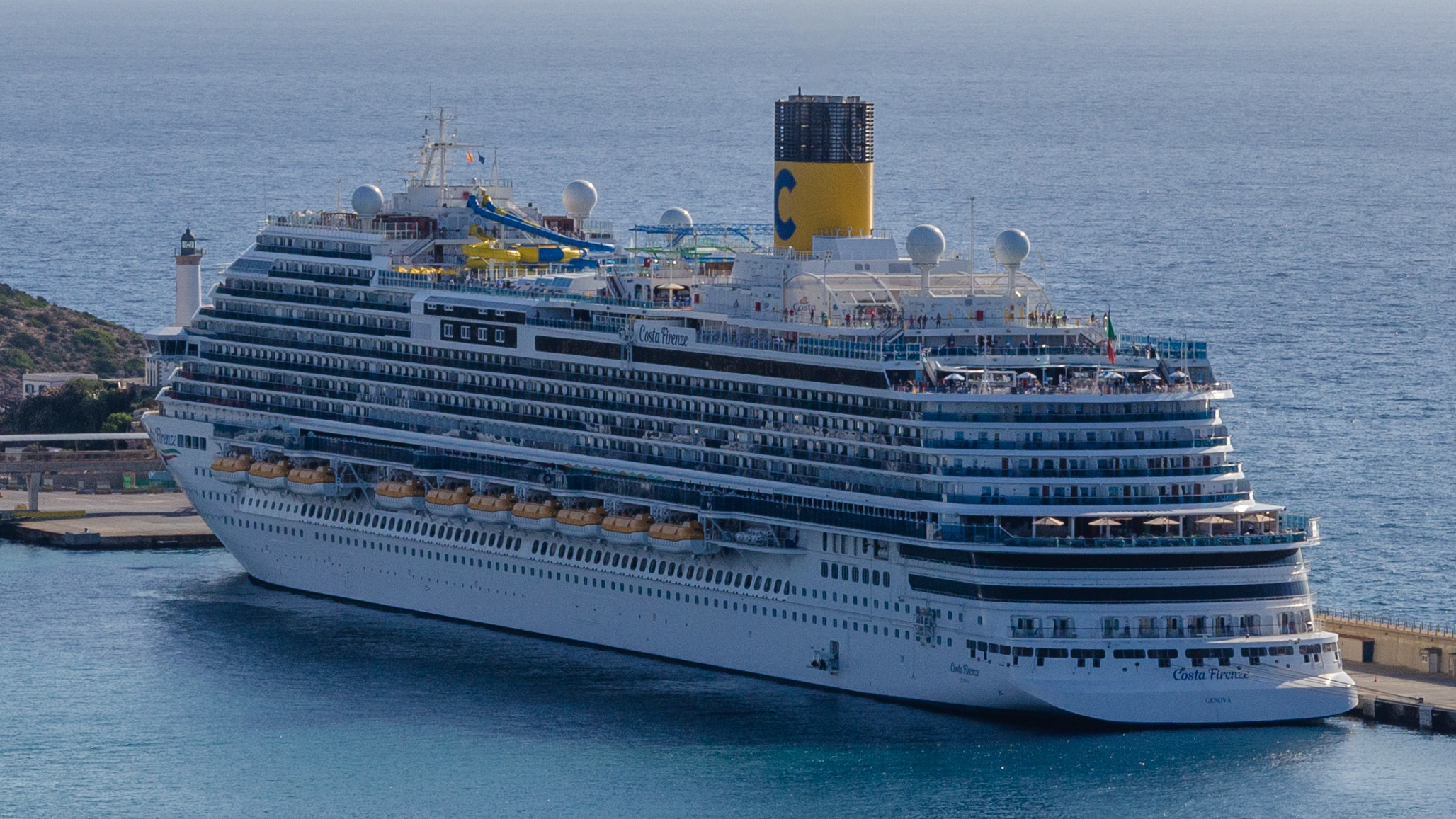
Costa Firenze was deployed in the Mediterranean during her maiden season in summer 2021 and visited ports including Ibiza.

Costa Firenze had her debut postponed from 2020 to 2021 after Costa was forced to revise the ship's inaugural plans on numerous occasions as a result of the pandemic-induced delivery delay and operational challenges. Costa first announced on 6 May 2019 that the ship would initially spend her first month sailing in the Mediterranean and call at ports in Italy, Spain, and France. Her original maiden voyage was scheduled for 1 October 2020, departing from Trieste and calling at Bari, Barcelona, and Marseille, before arriving in Savona. Then, she was to depart from Savona on 2 November to begin a 51-day cruise to Hong Kong, arriving on 22 December. But in August 2019, Costa cancelled her maiden voyage and first month of sailings in favor of repositioning the vessel to Singapore immediately following her delivery, after which she would debut in the Chinese market on 20 October 2020. In July 2020, it was reported that Costa had considered reverting her Asia deployment plans to reschedule her for weekly Mediterranean sailings previously arranged for Costa Toscana due to the latter's delayed delivery. In September, Costa announced a new seven-day maiden voyage in the Mediterranean commencing on 27 December. Then, in October, Costa further delayed the ship's debut in the Mediterranean with a new maiden voyage set for 28 February 2021, which was later annulled by cancellations announced in January 2021.

After repeated delays, Costa Firenze sailed on her inaugural voyage on 4 July 2021 on an all-Italian itinerary that called at Savona, Civitavecchia, Palermo, Naples, Messina, and Cagliari; she also began calling at ports in Spain and France in September 2021. She then followed her summer debut season with her maiden circuit in the Persian Gulf, where she operated week-long voyages from Dubai between December 2021 and March 2022. She returned to the Mediterranean in April 2022, where she operated week-long sailings through to November, which were followed by a repositioning to Brazil for her maiden South America season, where she operated until April 2023. Costa Firenze operated her last summer with Costa through a Northern Europe deployment between May and September 2023 and sailed her final winter season for the cruise line, calling at ports in the Mediterranean, Atlantic Europe, and Macaronesia prior to leaving the fleet in February 2024.

== Carnival Cruise Line (2024–present) ==
On 22 June 2022, Carnival Corporation announced that sister ship Costa Venezia and Costa Firenze would be transferred to Costa's sister brand, Carnival Cruise Line, in 2023 and 2024, respectively, under a new sub-brand, "Costa by Carnival" operating as "Carnival Fun Italian Style". Both ships would be renamed with the Carnival prefix, painted in a hybrid Costa and Carnival livery, and staffed and operated by Carnival. It was a project aimed at boosting Carnival's capacity in the American market during its recovery following the pandemic and came after Carnival had sold numerous older vessels in its fleet while Costa faced operational challenges in its core markets, including Europe and China.

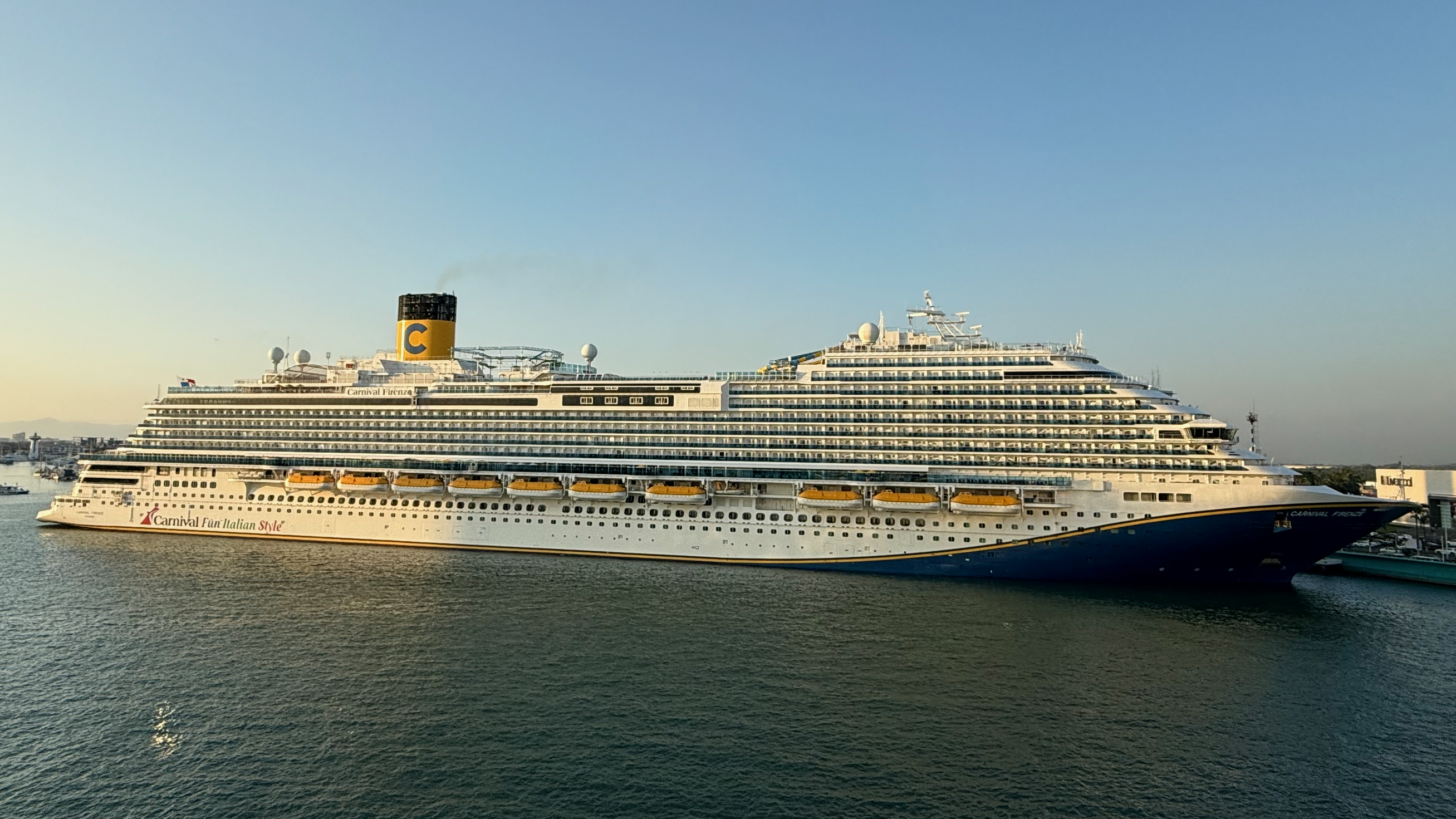
Carnival Firenze docked in Puerto Vallarta, Jalisco, Mexico, 2024

In December 2022, Carnival revealed that Carnival Venezia and Carnival Firenze would be slotted into its fleet as a sub-class of its existing Vista-class, known as the Venice-class. It also revealed that the two ships would combine many of the staples found on existing Carnival ships with new features and amenities inspired by Italian design and tastes, including new menu items across their bars and restaurants.

In January 2024, the ship began her 42-day refit and rebranding at the Navantia shipyard in Cádiz, where she was officially transferred into the Carnival fleet on 2 February and renamed Carnival Firenze. The ship left the shipyard on 22 March and sailed to her new homeport of Long Beach, California, after which she was christened by her godfather, American actor Jonathan Bennett, on 24 April. Originally scheduled to sail her inaugural voyage on 2 May 2024, Carnival Firenze commenced operations one week earlier, on 25 April, to the Mexican Riviera, a region to which she is deployed on a year-round basis.
