= Carnival Venezia =

Cruise ship

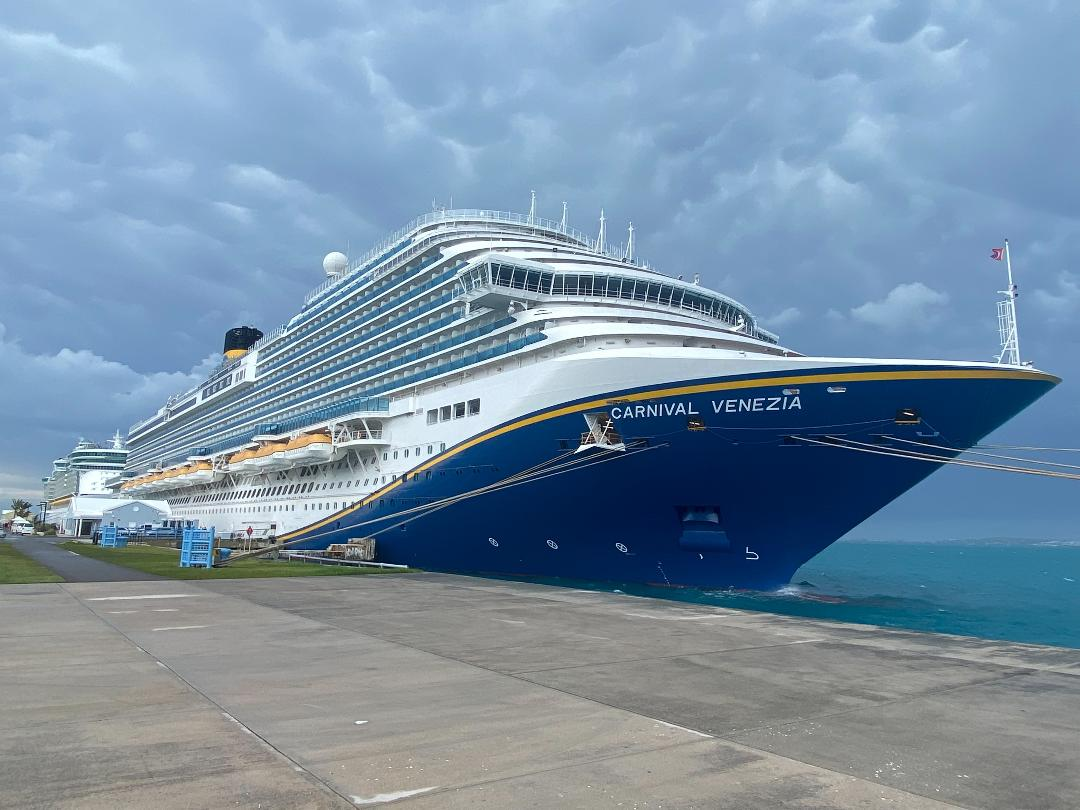
- Carnival Venezia at the Royal Naval Dockyard in Bermuda during its inaugural visit, 2023

History

Bahamas
- Name: Costa Venezia (2019–2023); Carnival Venezia (2023–present)
- Namesake: Venice, Italy
- Owner: Carnival Corporation & plc
- Operator: Costa Cruises (2019–2023); Carnival Cruise Line (2023–present)
- Port of registry: Genoa, Italy (2019–2023); Nassau, Bahamas (2023–present)
- Ordered: April 2016
- Builder: Fincantieri; Monfalcone, Italy
- Cost: $780 million
- Yard number: 6271
- Laid down: 1 November 2017
- Launched: 22 June 2018
- Sponsored by: Gan Beiye (Costa Venezia); Jay Leno (Carnival Venezia)
- Christened: 1 March 2019 (Costa Venezia); 14 June 2023 (Carnival Venezia)
- Completed: 28 February 2019
- In service: 8 March 2019 (Costa Venezia); 29 May 2023 (Carnival Venezia)
- Identification: Call sign: C6GI3; IMO number: 9801689; MMSI number: 311001253
- Status: In service

General characteristics
- Class & type: Vista-class cruise ship/ Venice-class
- Tonnage: 135,225 GT
- Length: 323.6 m (1,061 ft 8 in)
- Beam: 37.2 m (122 ft 1 in)
- Draught: 8.55 m (28 ft 1 in)
- Depth: 11.2 m (36 ft 9 in)
- Decks: 14 passenger decks
- Installed power: MAN 2x14V48/60 CR kW; +3x8L48/60 CR kW; 62,400 kW (83,700 hp) (Total power)
- Speed: 18 knots (33 km/h; 21 mph) (service)
- Capacity: 4,208 (double occupancy); 5,260 (max)
- Crew: 1,278 crew

Carnival Venezia is a Venice-class cruise ship operated by Carnival Cruise Line, a subsidiary of Carnival Corporation & plc. Originally intended to serve the Chinese market, she debuted as Costa Venezia for sister brand Costa Cruises in Shanghai on 18 May 2019. At 135,225 gross tonnage (GT) and with a capacity of 4,208 passengers, she became the largest ship commissioned for the Costa fleet upon her delivery.

In 2023, amid a corporate fleet reshuffling in the wake of the COVID-19 pandemic and its impact on the industry, Costa Venezia was transferred to Carnival under a new sub-brand named "Costa as Carnival" operating as "Carnival Fun Italian Style". The new concept was designed to integrate Costa Venezia and sister ship Costa Firenze into Carnival in a bid to boost domestic American capacity after the cruise line had sold numerous older vessels while Costa contended with operational challenges in its core markets. In March 2023, she was officially renamed Carnival Venezia during her pre-delivery renovation and debuted for Carnival the following May as the lead vessel for the new sub-fleet of Venice-class ships.

== Planning and construction (2015–2019) ==
Carnival Corporation entered a strategic agreement with Fincantieri in March 2015 about five cruise ships for delivery between 2019 and 2022. The Enchanted Princess was ordered in April 2016. In December 2015 Carnival and Fincantieri signed a memorandum of agreement about four cruise ships of them. In January 2016, Carnival Corporation announced that they had made firm their commitment with Fincantieri to expand Costa Cruises' Asia fleet, with two vessels at 135,500 gross tonnage (GT) each, with a guest capacity of approximately 4,200 passengers. The contracts were finalized in April 2016, which were built off of a memorandum agreed upon between the cruise line and the shipyard earlier in 2015. The ships, comprising a new class of vessels in Costa's fleet, were planned to carry an interior design that would focus on Costa's Italian traditions for their Asian clientele to experience.

On 1 November 2017, Costa Cruises announced that the first of the two vessels built specifically for the Chinese market would be named Costa Venezia. The announcement came at the coin ceremony for the ship at the Fincantieri shipyard in Monfalcone. On 22 June 2018, Costa Venezia was floated out from the shipyard and additional details were also announced about the ship's interior design and facilities, revealing that many of the key features of the ship would be inspired by Venetian landmarks and their architecture, including the ship's main atrium, theatre, and restaurants. She completed her first round of sea trials on 27 December 2018 and began the second round on 18 January 2019. Fincantieri officially delivered Costa Venezia to Costa Cruises on 28 February 2019 in Monfalcone.

== Costa Cruises (2019–2023) ==
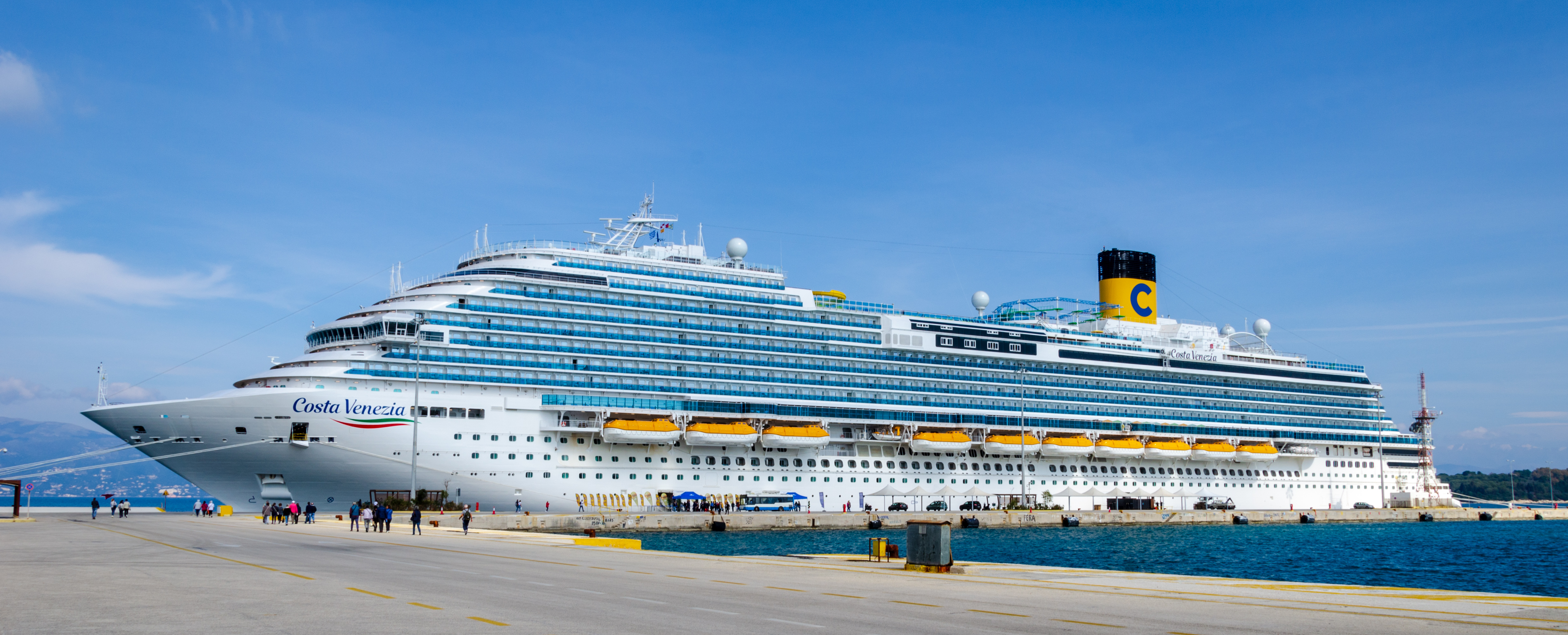
Carnival Venezia as Costa Venezia in Corfu, 2019

On 1 March 2019, Costa frequent cruiser Gan Beiye christened Costa Venezia at the naming ceremony in Trieste. The ship operated a vernissage cruise on 3 March, departing from Trieste to Greece and Croatia, before arriving back in Trieste on 8 March, after which she sailed her official inaugural voyage, a 53-day cruise from Trieste to Tokyo. Beginning on 18 May 2019, Costa Venezia was homeported year-round in Shanghai, serving exclusively Chinese guests on itineraries around East Asia. After several years of inactivity, in May 2022, she was redeployed to Istanbul to sail in the Mediterranean before she halted service for Costa on 1 December.

== Carnival Cruise Line (2023–present) ==
On 22 June 2022, Carnival Corporation announced that Costa Venezia and sister ship Costa Firenze would be transferred to Costa's sister brand, Carnival Cruise Line, in 2023 and 2024, respectively, under a new sub-brand, "Costa by Carnival" operating as "Carnival Fun Italian Style". Both ships would be renamed with the Carnival prefix, painted in a hybrid Costa and Carnival livery, and staffed and operated by Carnival. It was a project aimed at boosting Carnival's capacity in the American market during its recovery following the COVID-19 pandemic and came after Carnival had sold numerous older vessels in its fleet while Costa faced operational challenges in its core markets, including Europe and China.

In December 2022, Carnival revealed that Carnival Venezia and Carnival Firenze would be slotted into its fleet as a sub-class of its existing Vista-class, known as the Venice-class. It also revealed that the two ships would combine many of the staples found on existing Carnival ships with new features and amenities inspired by Italian design and tastes, including new menu items across their bars and restaurants. In March 2023, the ship began her refit and rebranding effort at the Navantia shipyard in Cádiz, and she officially joined the fleet on 22 March in a handover ceremony that also witnessed her renaming to Carnival Venezia. The ship left the shipyard in late-May and commenced operations on 29 May 2023 with her inaugural voyage, a two-week transatlantic crossing from Barcelona to New York, after which she will be christened by her godfather, American comedian Jay Leno, on 14 June 2023. Carnival Venezia sails year-round from her homeport in Manhattan to the Caribbean and from December 2024, she operates week-long Caribbean voyages from Port Canaveral on a seasonal basis.
