= Carnival Panorama =

Vista-class cruise ship

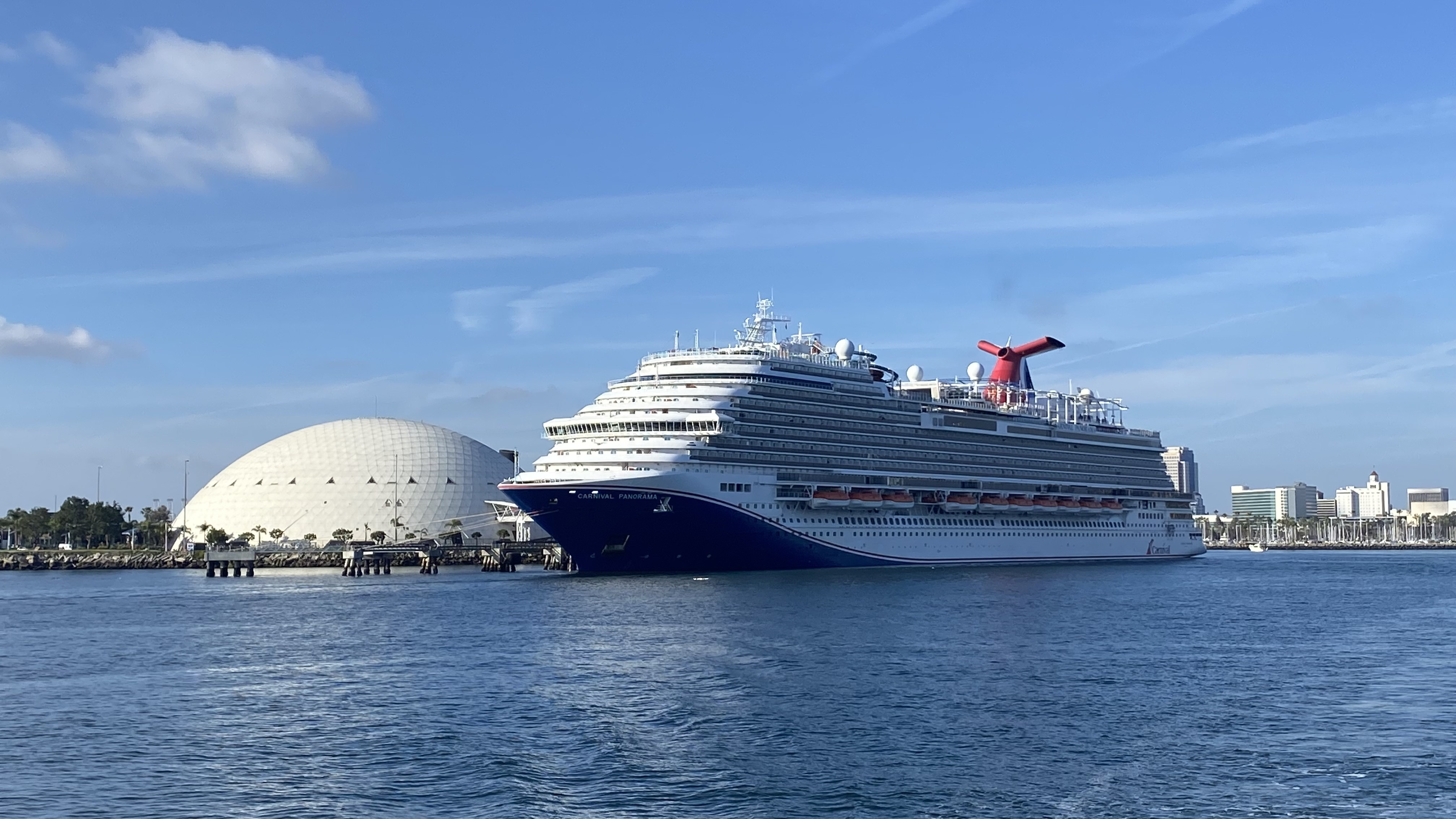
- Carnival Panorama docked in Long Beach, California, 2025

History

Panama
- Name: Carnival Panorama
- Owner: Carnival Corporation & plc
- Operator: Carnival Cruise Line
- Port of registry: Panama
- Route: Mexican Riviera
- Builder: Fincantieri, Marghera, Italy
- Laid down: 11 January 2018
- Launched: 6 December 2018
- Sponsored by: Vanna White
- Christened: 10 December 2019
- Acquired: 29 October 2019
- In service: 11 December 2019
- Home port: Long Beach, California
- Identification: Call sign: 3FJB3; IMO number: 9802384; MMSI number: 374527000
- Status: In service

General characteristics
- Class & type: Vista-class cruise ship
- Tonnage: 133,868 GT
- Length: 323.0 m (1,059 ft 9 in)
- Beam: 37.2 m (122 ft 1 in) (waterline); 48 m (158 ft) (max)
- Draught: 8.25 m (27 ft 1 in)
- Depth: 11.2 m (36 ft 9 in)
- Decks: 15 (passenger decks)
- Installed power: MAN Diesel & Turbo: 3 × 8L48/60CR +; 2 × 14V48/60CR generating sets; 62.4 MW (83,700 hp)
- Propulsion: Diesel-electric 2 × ABB Azipod (2 × 16.5 MW)
- Speed: 18.0 kn (33.3 km/h; 20.7 mph) (service); 22.6 kn (41.9 km/h; 26.0 mph) (max)
- Capacity: 4,008 (double occupancy); 5,146 (maximum)
- Crew: 1,450

Carnival Panorama is a Vista-class cruise ship operated by Carnival Cruise Line. After Carnival finalized the ship's order with Italian shipbuilder Fincantieri in December 2016, the vessel had her keel laid in January 2018. She was formally delivered in October 2019 as the flagship of the fleet, serving in that role until Mardi Gras debuted in 2021. Measuring 133,868 GT and 323 m (1,059 ft 9 in) long, she is the largest of Carnival's original three Vista-class vessels. Since her debut in December 2019, she has been homeported at the Port of Long Beach and sails week-long itineraries to the Mexican Riviera.

== Design and description ==
The vessel's public facilities are similar to and evolved from those offered on Carnival Vista and Carnival Horizon. One distinct feature is a Sky Zone trampoline park in place of the IMAX theater found on her older sister ships. The ship also has activity venues including a Waterworks aqua park inspired by Shaquille O'Neal.

== Construction and career ==
In March 2015, Carnival Corporation and Fincantieri made an agreement for five ships to be delivered between 2019 and 2022. On an announcement released on 30 December 2015, Carnival Corporation further established that the planned 4,200-passenger ship was set to be delivered to Carnival's sister brand, P&O Cruises Australia. A year later, on 15 December 2016, Carnival Corporation announced that the original order for P&O Cruises Australia would be transferred to Carnival Cruise Line as their third Vista-class vessel. The announcement stated that a delivery for the vessel was set for the fall of 2019. To compensate for the order, P&O was to receive a retrofitted Carnival Splendor instead, however in September 2017, it was announced that Carnival Splendor would stay in the Carnival fleet and P&O Cruises Australia would get Princess Cruises Golden Princess in 2020. On 1 December 2017, Carnival Corporation officially announced that the third and final ship in the Vista class of the fleet would be named Carnival Panorama.

Construction officially began on the then-unnamed vessel on 7 July 2017 at Fincantieri's shipyard in Marghera, Italy, with a steel-cutting ceremony. The keel was laid on 10 January 2018. She was launched from the shipyard on 6 December 2018.

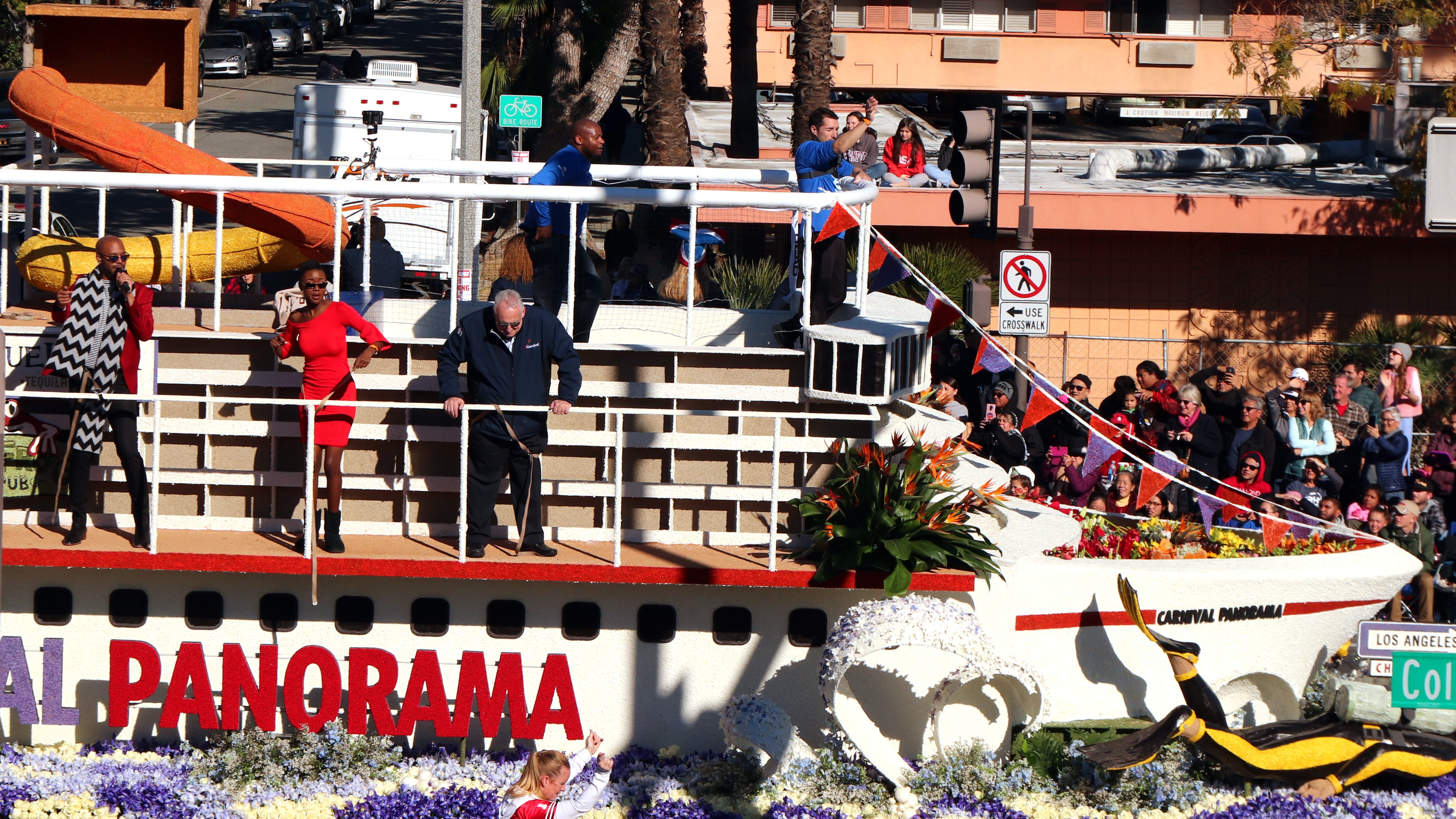
The Carnival Panorama float, "Come Sail Away," at the 2019 Rose Parade

Carnival publicly previewed the ship in the 2019 Tournament of Roses Parade. The float, named "Come Sail Away," was modeled after the ship and contained trampolines and played upbeat music. On 18 July 2019, she completed her sea trials in the Adriatic Sea. On 29 October, Fincantieri officially presented Carnival Panorama to Carnival Cruise Line at the Marghera shipyard. To travel from Marghera to California for her christening and debut, Panorama embarked on a 38-day journey that took her across the Atlantic Ocean and through the Strait of Magellan to sail up the western coast of South America, making stops in Santa Cruz de Tenerife, Montevideo, Santiago, and Puerto Vallarta. She arrived at her initial destination of the Port of Los Angeles in the early morning of 8 December for final preparations.

On the afternoon of 9 December, Carnival Panorama moved to her home port, the Port of Long Beach, for her welcoming ceremonies and docked there for the first time early that evening. The ship was christened the following day by her godmother, Wheel of Fortune hostess Vanna White.

Since her debut, Carnival Panorama has been homeported in Long Beach. She embarked on her three-day inaugural voyage to Ensenada on 11 December 2019. Upon returning to Long Beach, she began sailing 7-day Mexican Riviera cruises to Cabo San Lucas, Mazatlán, and Puerto Vallarta on a year-round basis, taking over the week-long itinerary from Carnival Splendor. (Note: When Carnival Splendor left for Australia in October 2019, Carnival Miracle temporarily sailed the Mexican Riviera itinerary before Carnival Panorama arrived at Long Beach.)

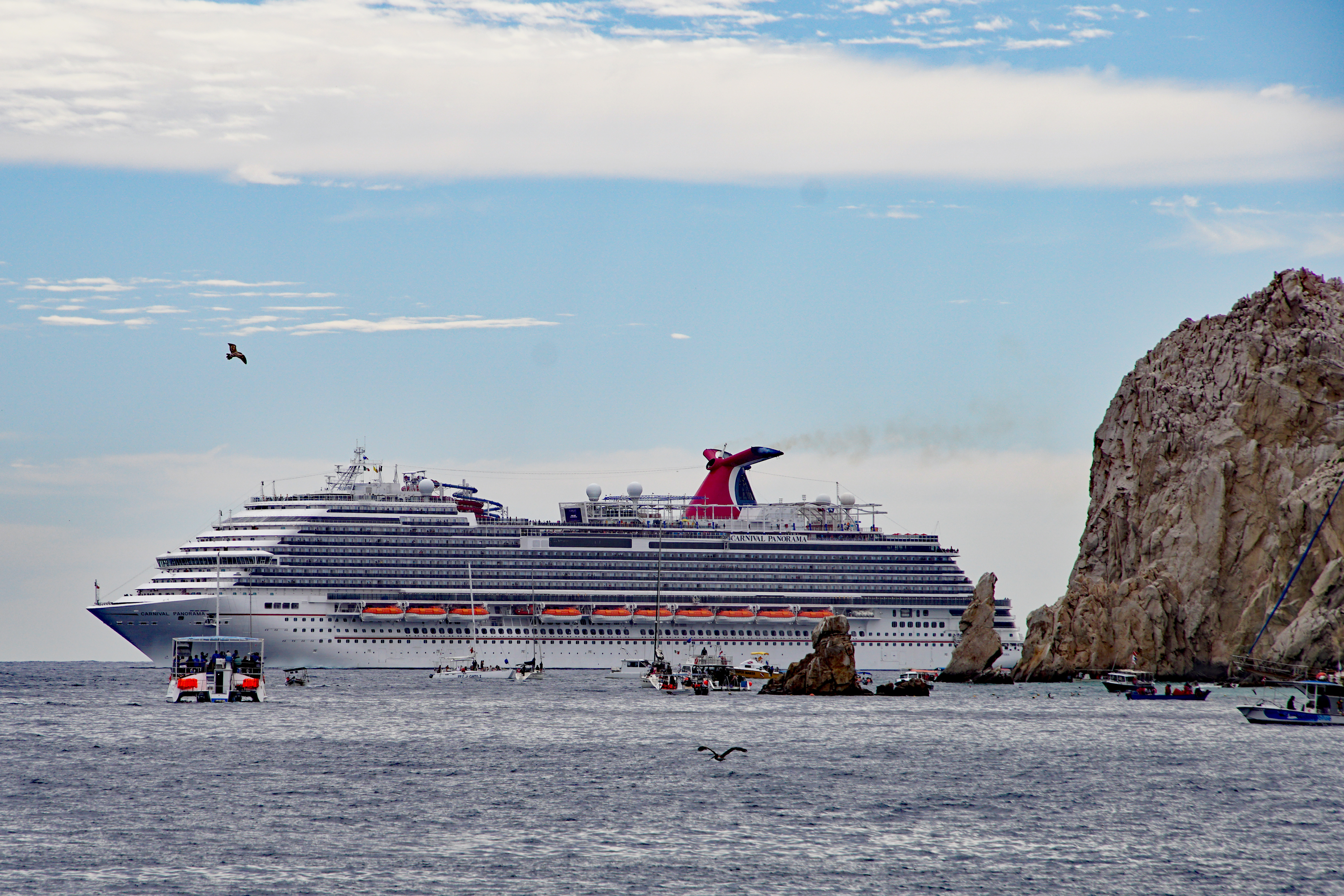
Carnival Panorama at Cabo San Lucas, Baja California Sur, Mexico, 2020

=== COVID-19 pandemic ===
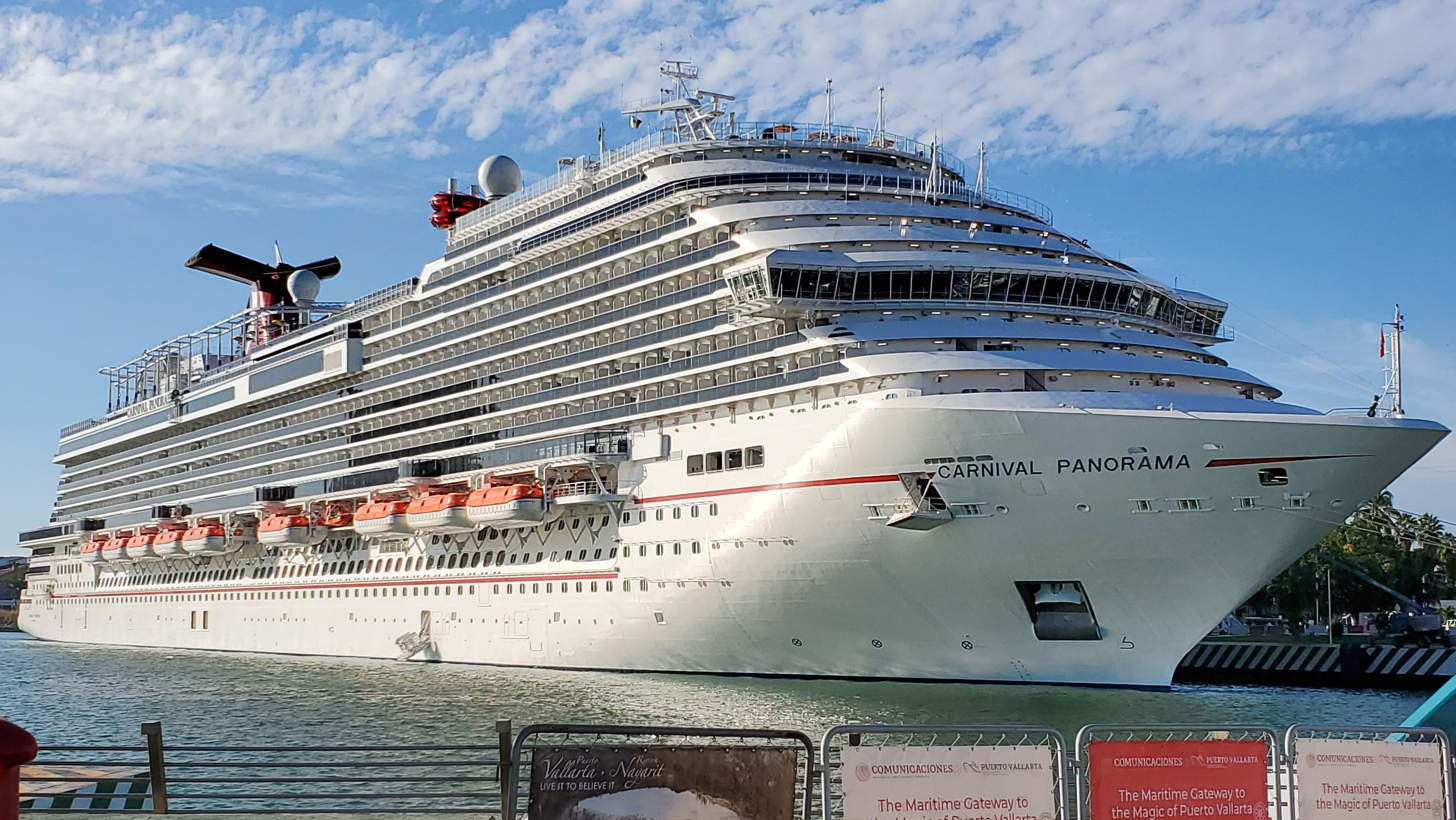
Carnival Panorama at Puerto Vallarta, Jalisco, Mexico, on 8 January 2020

When Carnival Panorama returned to Long Beach on 7 March 2020, a female passenger was reported to be ill. As a result, the debarkation was halted by the Centers for Disease Control and Prevention (CDC) and the Long Beach Fire Department until the woman could be tested for COVID-19 at a nearby hospital. Initial reports stated that the ailing guest did not meet the criteria for coronavirus, but the CDC wanted to take "extra precautions".

The CDC confirmed later in the evening that the guest tested negative for COVID-19, but the rest of the passengers spent the night onboard and disembarked the following morning. Due to the CDC holding Carnival Panorama one day late, her subsequent voyage was cut short to six days. The ship was returning from a trip to Mexico with scheduled stops at Cabo San Lucas, Mazatlán and Puerto Vallarta, which were also scheduled stops for Grand Princess during the previous month.

Carnival Panorama was the fifth Carnival ship (the others being Carnival Spirit, Carnival Ecstasy, Carnival Magic, and Australia-based Carnival Splendor) to repatriate crewmembers back to their respective countries. She was the only ship sailing from her homeport until April 2021, when Carnival Radiance began sailing itineraries previously served by Carnival Imagination and Carnival Inspiration. (Note: Both of these Fantasy-class ships sailed alternating 3–4 day itineraries to Ensenada and Catalina Island from Long Beach.)

In 2023, the ship was drydocked at Portland. Therefore, it was necessary to remove the funnel because the bridges crossing the Columbia River are too low.

In 2024, the ship got the new Carnival color scheme.

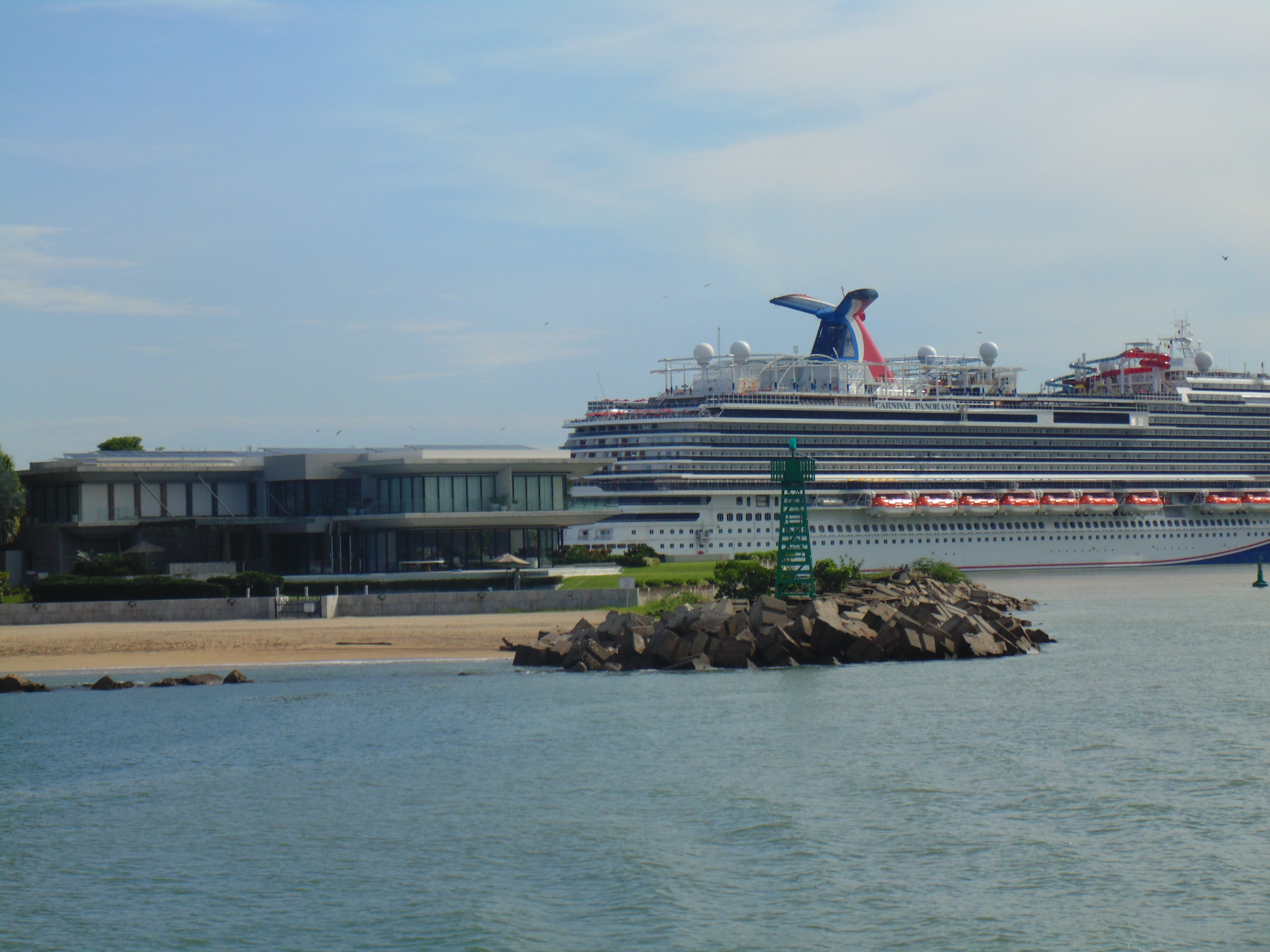
Carnival Panorama at Puerto Vallarta, Jalisco, Mexico, 2025

On September 19, 2026, a passenger attending the cruise was declared missing. Because of this, everyone else had to return to their stateroom.

Later that day, the ship had to turn around after finding out the missing passenger went overboard, notifying a Florida coast guard, as well as other authorities.

Unfortunately, the employees could not find the missing passenger, leaving it to the authorities, giving support to their family, and allowing everybody to leave their rooms.
