= Carnival Freedom =

Conquest-class cruise ship operated by Carnival Cruise Line

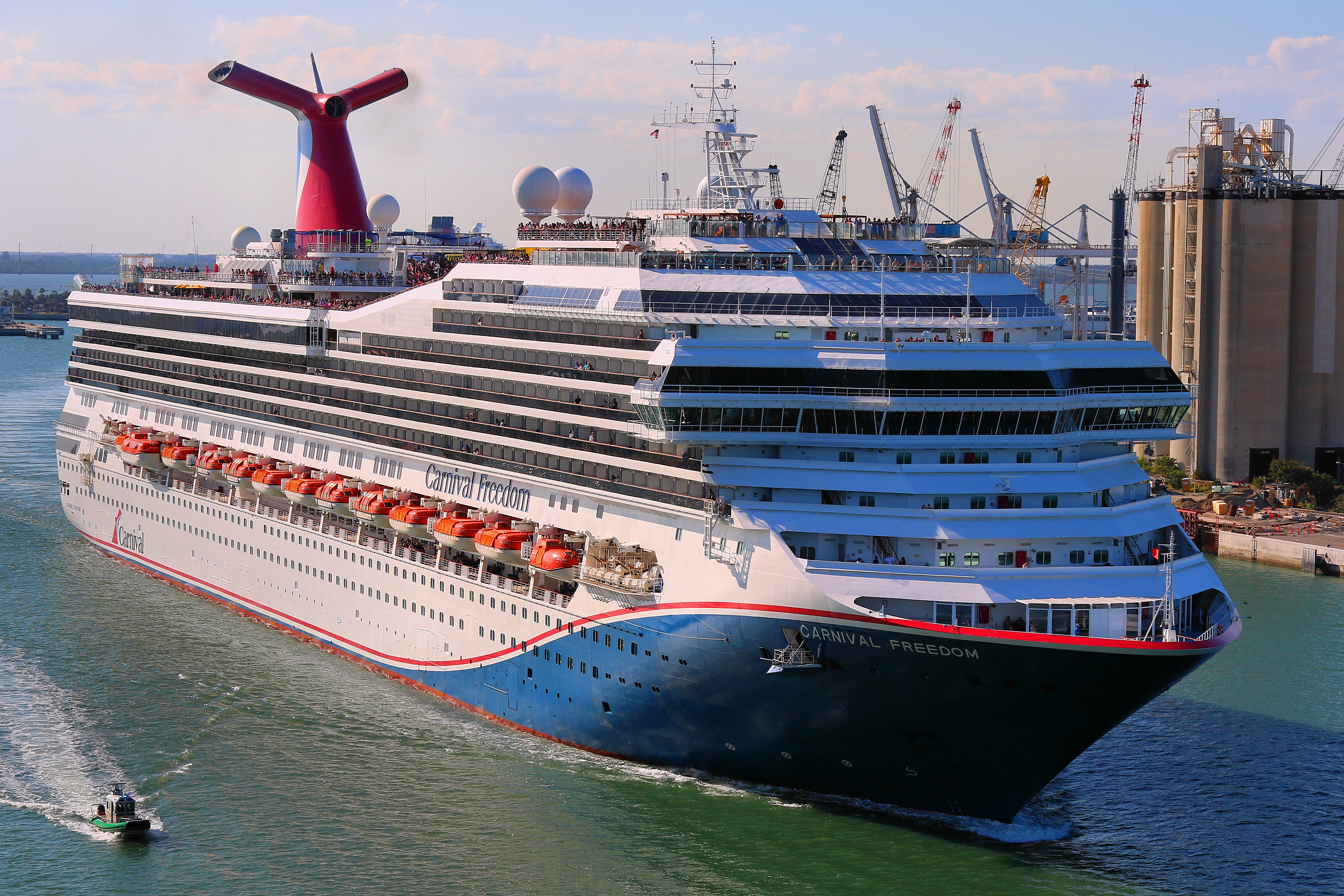
- Carnival Freedom in 2024

History
- Name: Carnival Freedom
- Owner: Carnival Corporation & plc
- Operator: Carnival Cruise Line
- Port of registry: Panama City,
- Builder: Fincantieri; Marghera (Venice), Italy
- Yard number: 6129
- Launched: 28 April 2006
- Sponsored by: Kathy Ireland
- Christened: 4 March 2007
- Acquired: 28 February 2007
- Maiden voyage: 5 March 2007
- Identification: Call sign: 3EBL5; IMO number: 9333149; MMSI number: 371154000
- Status: In service

General characteristics
- Class & type: Conquest-class cruise ship
- Tonnage: 110,000 GT
- Length: 952 ft (290.2 m)
- Beam: 116 ft (35.4 m)
- Decks: 13 (numbered 1-14, skipping the number 13)
- Installed power: Six diesel-electric generators (Wärtsilä 12V46C)
- Propulsion: Two shafts
- Speed: 21 knots (39 km/h; 24 mph) (service); 22.5 knots (41.7 km/h; 25.9 mph) (maximum)
- Capacity: 2,980 passengers
- Crew: 1,150

Carnival Freedom is a Conquest-class cruise ship operated by Carnival Cruise Line. She is the 22nd operating vessel in the fleet, and the last of the Conquest-class ships. The ship was built as part of a four-ship deal with Fincantieri's Marghera shipyard and was launched in Venice, Italy on 28 April 2006. She was delivered to Carnival on 28 February 2007.

== Description and design ==
The ship has 1,150 crew, 1,487 cabins and is able to carry 2,974 passengers traveling at a speed of 21 knots (39 km/h; 24 mph).

== History ==
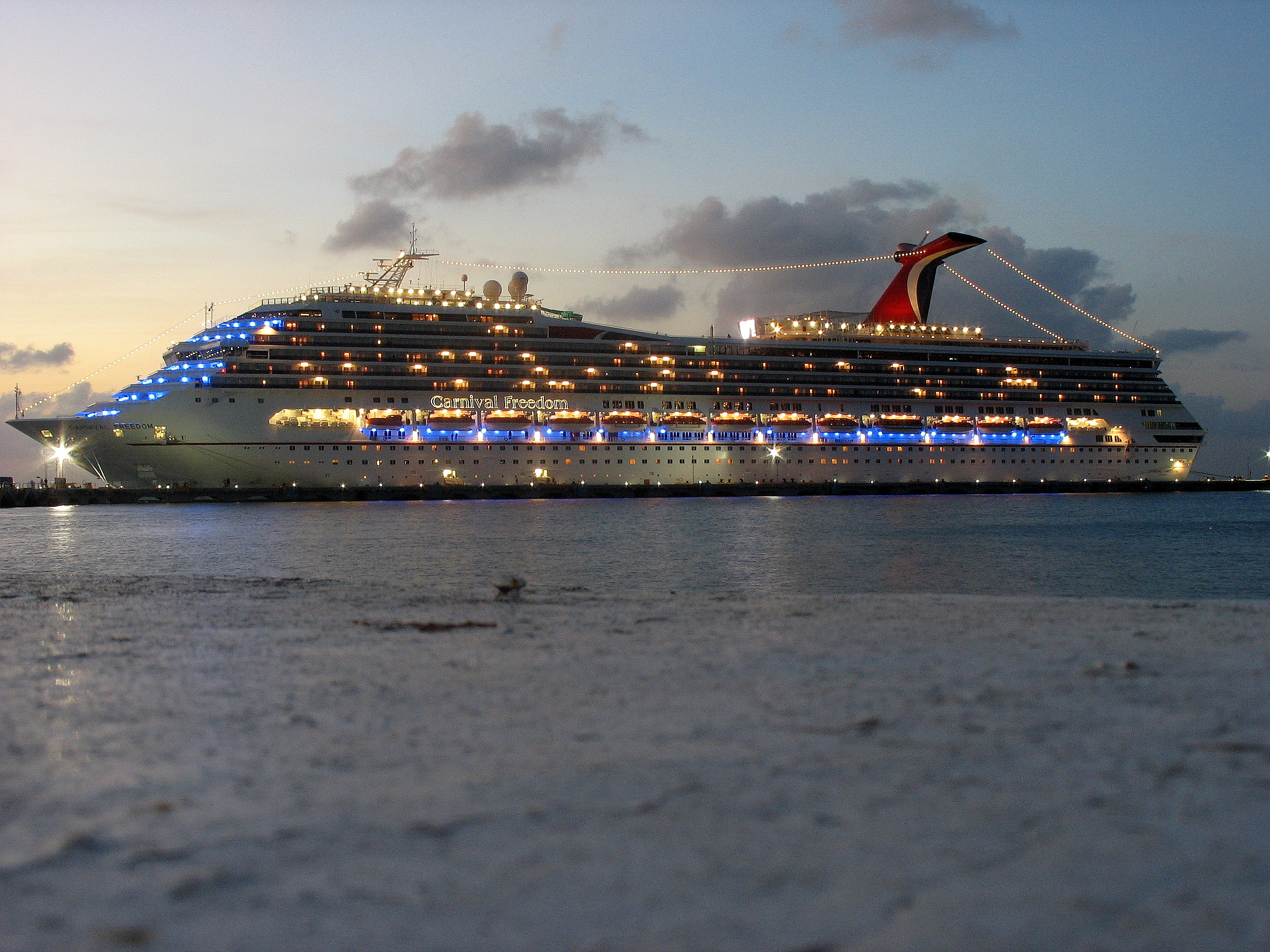
Carnival Freedom at night on 3 March 2008

The ship was built by Fincantieri at its Marghera shipyard in Venice, Italy. She was floated out on 28 April 2006, delivered to Carnival on 28 February 2007, and formally named in Venice by American model, actress, author and entrepreneur Kathy Ireland on 4 March 2007.

Carnival Freedom initially sailed from her homeport in Civitavecchia near Rome on Mediterranean cruises until the Fall of 2007 when she sailed the Caribbean Sea from the Port of Miami. In the summer of 2008, she returned to Europe and sailed in the Mediterranean again. In the fall of 2008, she sailed the Caribbean again but out of Port Everglades until February 2015 when she changed her home port to Galveston, Texas.

Carnival Freedom entered a three-week routine drydock in Freeport, Bahamas on 30 March 2014 for refurbishment.

The ship went for another dry dock in March 2019. That month, the ship debuted with its water park and major renovation. Carnival Freedom resumed port calls to Grand Bahama in November 2019 when Hurricane Dorian ravaged the country. In 2019, a photographer took a picture of the ship emitting black smoke in Cayman Islands. The cruise line told the media that the smoke was caused by an engine turbocharger malfunction.

=== COVID-19 ===
On 23 March 2020, a crew member who had sailed on the six day 8 March cruise out of Galveston, Texas was hospitalized in Gulfport, Mississippi after experiencing flu-like symptoms. On 25 March they received a positive test result for COVID-19 and passengers from the cruise were subsequently asked to quarantine for 14 days by the cruise line. The passengers had disembarked in Galveston, Texas on 14 March – a day after Carnival Cruise Line suspended operations due to coronavirus.

The ship repositioned to Seattle and sails to Alaska since 2021.

== Incidents ==
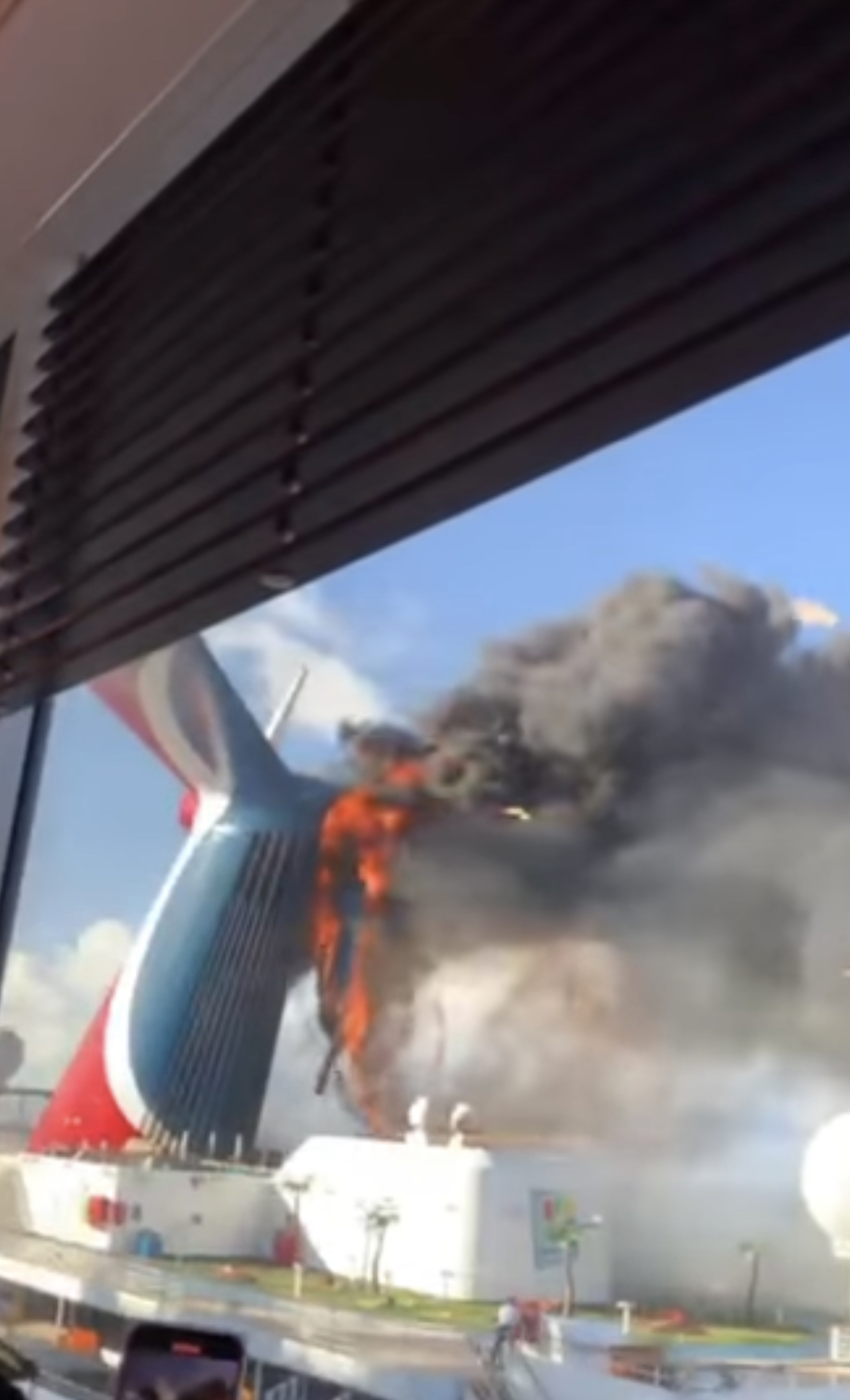
The funnel of Carnival Freedom on fire, May 2022.

On 26 May 2022, Carnival Freedom suffered a large fire in her funnel while she was docked in Grand Turk. The fire was extinguished with no injuries reported. Significant damage was sustained to part of the funnel, on the starboard side. Guests and crew members were allowed to go ashore, as originally planned in Grand Turk. It was announced in the evening of 26 May 2022, by Carnival through a letter to guests that the Carnival Freedom would remain in Grand Turk with passengers on board. Carnival Conquest was scheduled to embark passengers from Carnival Freedom as the ship would not be returning to Port Canaveral. Following the incident, Carnival Freedom underwent an emergency drydock in Grand Bahama for repairs, which included the removal of the funnel's damaged wings. As for compensation, Carnival gave a $100 per stateroom onboard credit and a 50 percent off future cruise credit. Any additional parking fees at the Port Canaveral parking garage were waived, and Carnival would cover fees related to changed flights up to $200 per person. The ship resumed normal service on 11 June 2022, with the altered funnel.

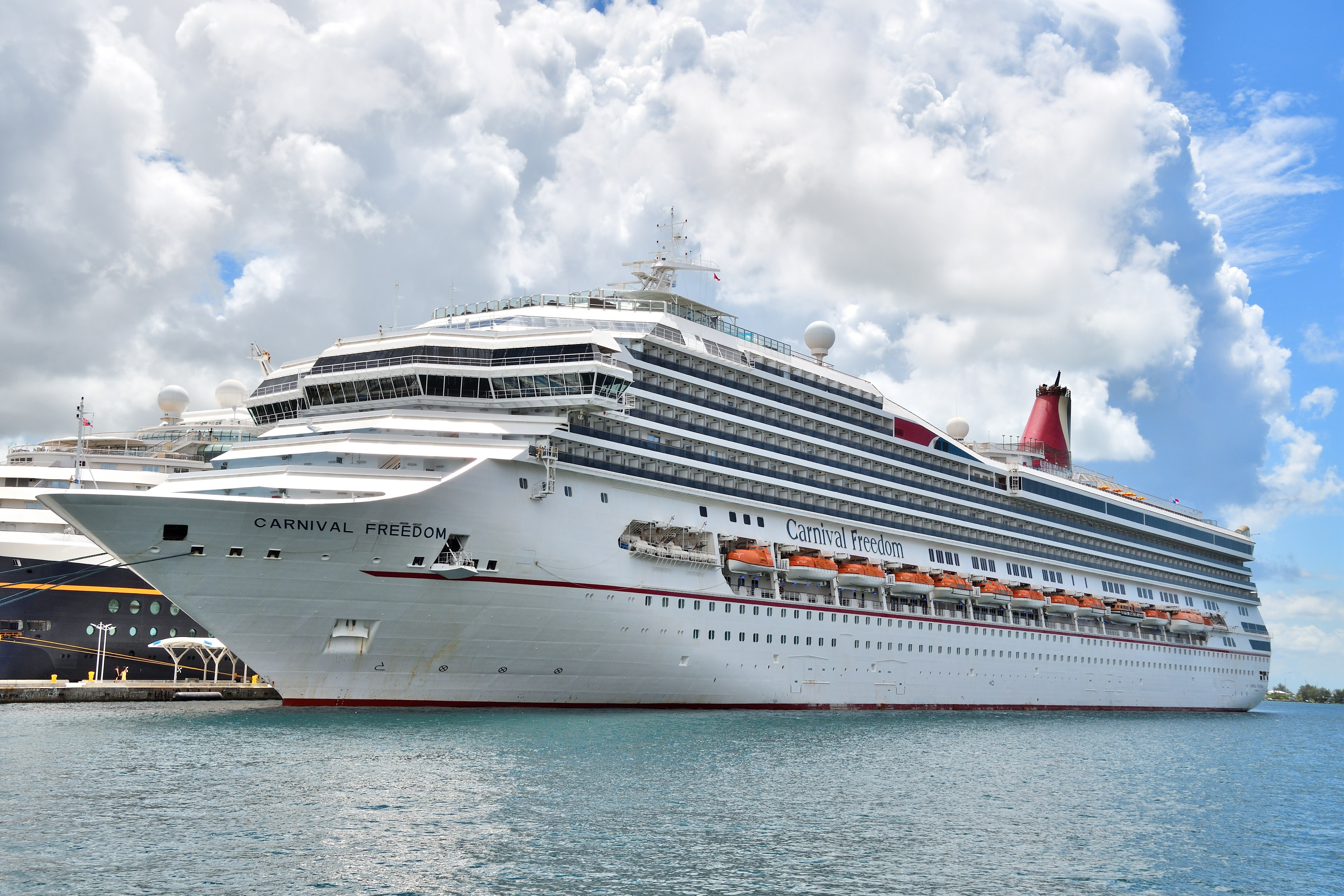
Carnival Freedom in August 2023, sporting the altered funnel following the May 2022 fire.

From 4 to 22 October 2023, the ship entered its 16-day dry dock at the Navantia shipyard in Cadiz, Spain. Once again sporting a winged funnel, Carnival Freedom sailed from Barcelona, Spain for a 14-day transatlantic voyage to its homeport of Port Canaveral, Florida. The ship underwent an extensive refurbishment that included the installation of the new funnel, the addition of the signature Carnival red, white and blue hull livery and other enhancements, including a Heroes Tribute Bar, like other ships in the Carnival fleet, which honors both military veterans and active-duty service members. Carnival Freedom also features a Dreams Studio. Some of the other work included an expansion to the ship's casino, and renovations and upgrades across the ship's staterooms and public areas.

On 23 March 2024, Carnival Freedom was sailing through severe weather when passengers reported an extremely loud thunder clap and lightning. Shortly after, a fire was reported in the port side exhaust. This led to the next two cruises being cancelled for repairs to be carried out. The funnel wings were removed at Freeport, Bahamas and the exhausts re-routed, leaving it with a more conventional appearance. The ship would finally get a new winged funnel again in September 2026.
