= Carnival Glory =

Cruise ship built in 2003

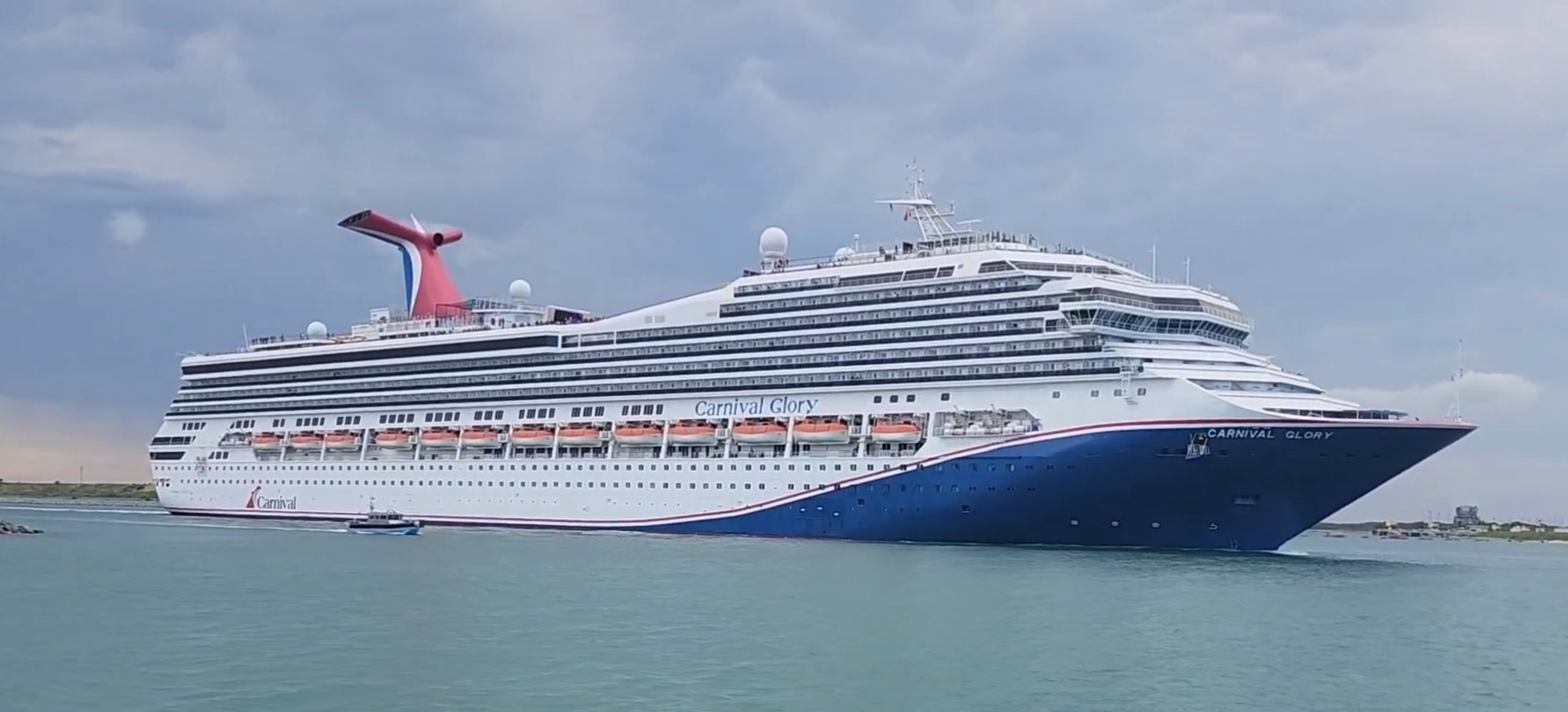
- Carnival Glory Departs Port Canaveral on June 20, 2025

History
- Name: Carnival Glory
- Owner: Carnival Corporation & plc
- Operator: Carnival Cruise Line
- Port of registry: Panama
- Ordered: August 4, 1998
- Builder: Fincantieri; Monfalcone, Italy
- Cost: US $500 million
- Yard number: 6058
- Launched: 2003
- Sponsored by: Dr Sally Ride
- Christened: July 19, 2003
- Completed: 2003
- Maiden voyage: July 14, 2003
- In service: 2003–present
- Identification: Call sign: 3FPS9; IMO number: 9198367; MMSI number: 357659000
- Status: In service

General characteristics
- Class & type: Conquest-class cruise ship
- Tonnage: 110,000 GT
- Length: 952 ft (290.2 m)
- Beam: 116 ft (35.4 m)
- Draft: 27 ft (8.2 m)
- Decks: 13 decks
- Installed power: 6 × Wärtsilä 12W, 63,400 kW (combined)
- Propulsion: 2 × propellers
- Speed: 22.5 knots (41.7 km/h; 25.9 mph)
- Capacity: 2,980 passengers
- Crew: 1,150

Carnival Glory is a Conquest-class cruise ship operated by Carnival Cruise Line. She is the second of five Conquest-class cruise ships. As of August 2025, she operates out of Port Canaveral.

Carnival Glory, constructed by Fincantieri at their Monfalcone shipyard in Italy, was floated out in 2003. The ship features two pools, a 214-foot water slide, six whirlpools, and a 13,300 square foot spa. It underwent refurbishment in 2012 and 2017, receiving new features and renovated areas. Carnival Glory has operated from various ports, including Miami, New York City, New Orleans and Norfolk, Virginia, and as of 2025, its home port is Port Canaveral, Florida. The ship has experienced several incidents, including passengers falling overboard or from balconies, and a collision with Carnival Legend in 2019, which resulted in minor injuries to six passengers.

== Construction ==
Built by Fincantieri at their Monfalcone shipyard in Friuli-Venezia Giulia, northern Italy, she was floated out on July 19, 2003, and christened by American physicist and astronaut Dr Sally Ride.

== Facilities ==
Carnival Glory has two pools, six whirlpools, and a 214-foot (65 m) water slide. The ship also features a 13,300 square foot spa.

== Refits ==
Carnival Glory was first drydocked in November 2012 for refurbishment.

In February and March 2017, she received a new "WaterWorks" feature, along with renovations of additional areas aboard the ship.

Between January and March 2024 she was serviced in Cádiz, Spain, including being drydocked for two weeks.

== Areas of operation ==
In November 2009, Carnival Glory was redeployed to Miami. Later in June 2010, Carnival Glory began conducting summer cruises out of New York City, undertaking Canadian-bound cruises. Carnival Glory also has cruised out of Norfolk, Virginia.

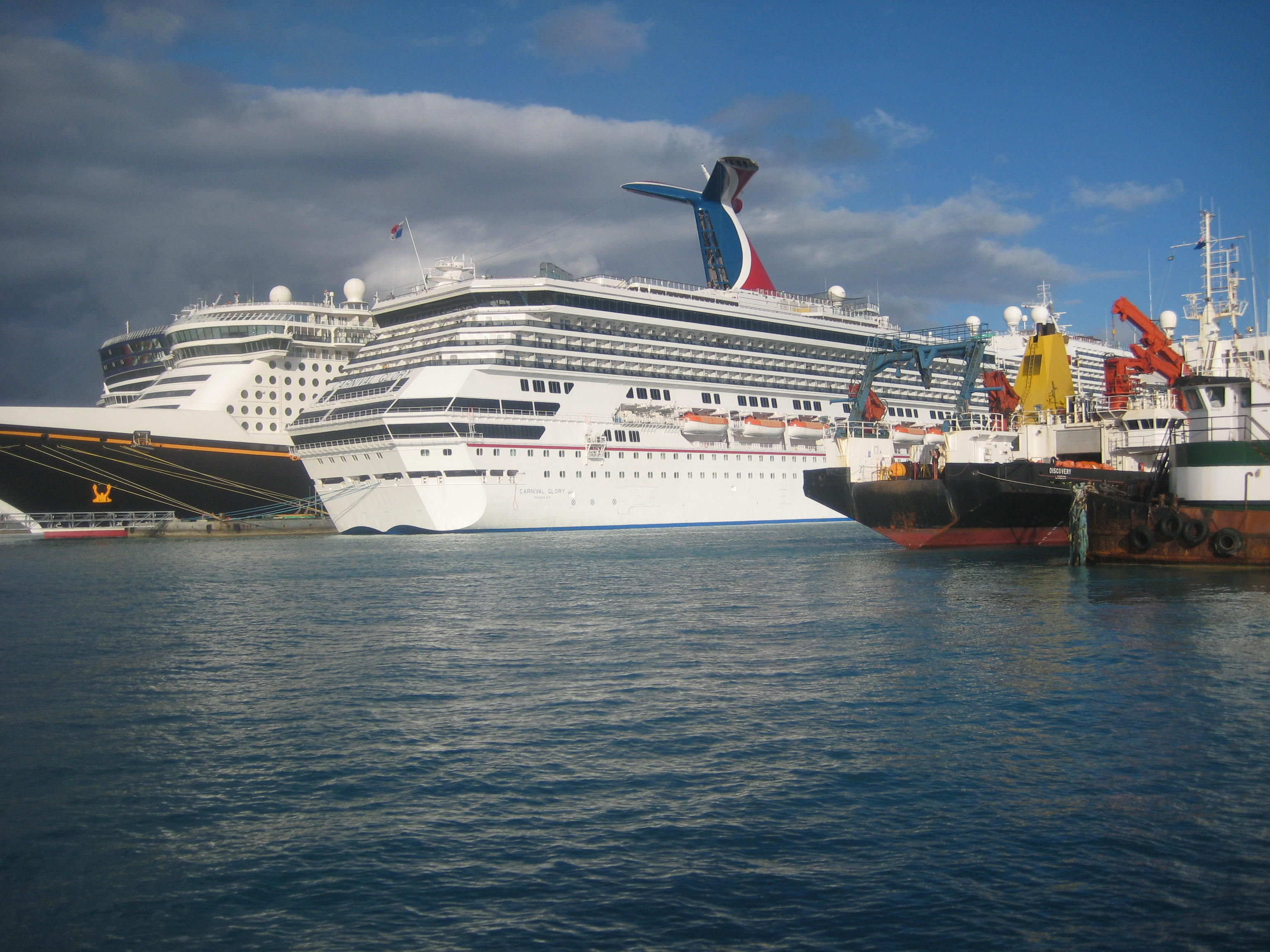
Carnival Glory docked in Nassau in the Bahamas on November 12, 2012

In 2014, Carnival Glory operated eastern and western Caribbean cruises departing out of Miami.

In January 2018, Carnival Glory was the first of Carnival's ship which returned to St. Thomas since hurricanes in September 2017.

As of May 2024, Carnival Glory's new homeport is Port Canaveral.

In late March 2024, "Carnival Glory" was drydocked in Cádiz, Spain for unspecified repairs or refurbishments. Those measures included an expanded and redesigned casino, as well as new carpeting, mattresses, and bedside lamps with USB throughout the cabins.

On 2 March 2023, Carnival announced that Carnival Glory will sail a 14-night transatlantic cruise in 2024 from Barcelona to Port Canaveral. She will sail from Barcelona on April 18, 2024, to Port Canaveral on May 2. From May 2024 onward, Carnival Glory will sail 3- and 4-night Bahamas cruises from Port Canaveral, replacing Carnival Liberty, which will go to New Orleans.

== Incidents ==
On March 16, 2007, a 35-year-old male passenger jumped through a window and fell 60 ft (18 m) into the water 30 mi (48 km) east of Fort Lauderdale, Florida. He was rescued 8 hours later.

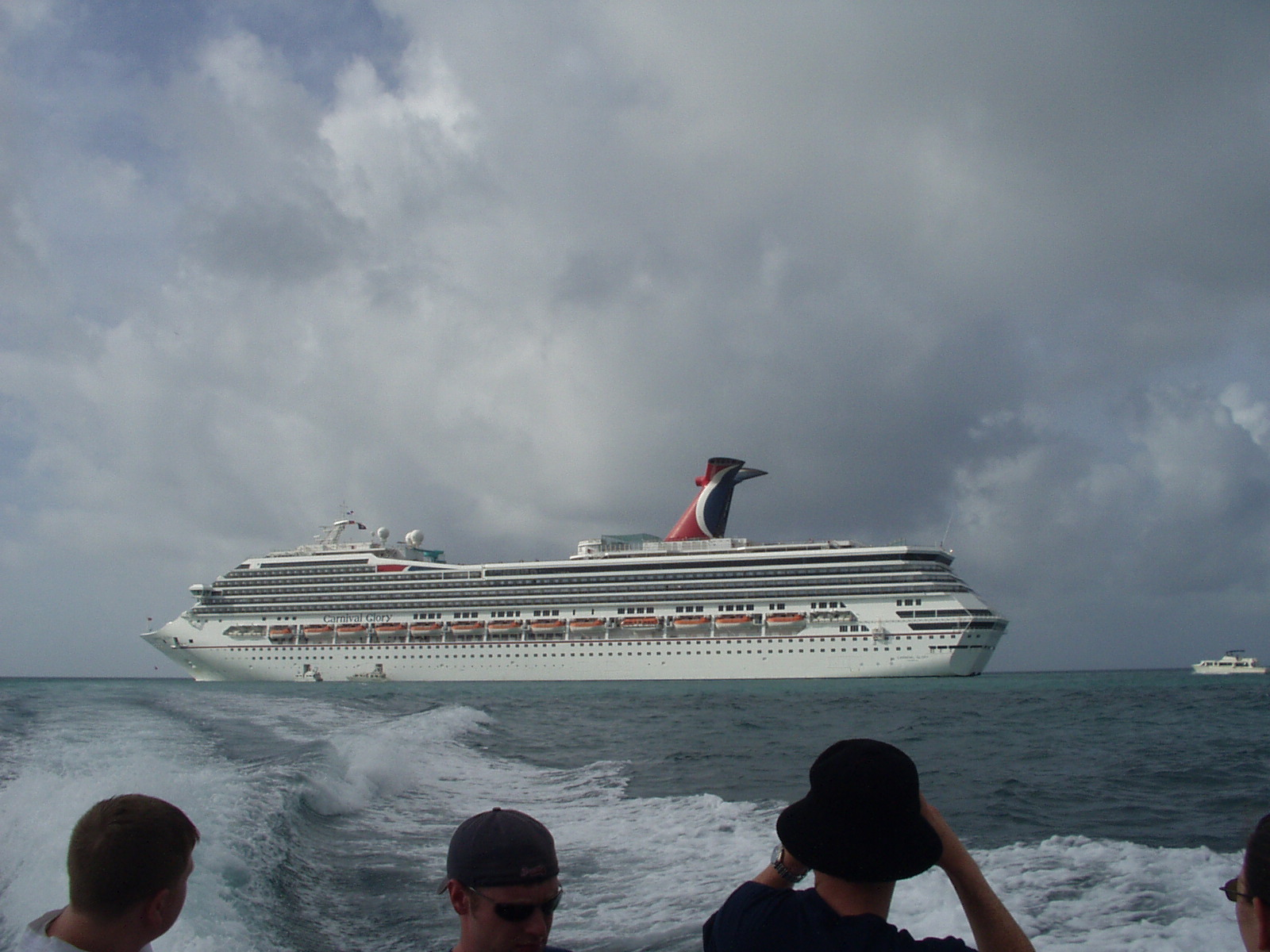
Carnival Glory anchored in Belize City, Belize on July 22, 2007

On March 8, 2015, 21-year-old Virginia Tech student, Cameron Smook, fell overboard from a 6th deck balcony. Surveillance video showed Smook climb over the balcony's railing before falling into the water. A 6,500 square nautical miles (22,000 km^{2}; 8,600 sq mi) search was conducted 6 mi (9.7 km) south of Abaco Island, Bahamas. The United States Coast Guard along with other area vessels conducted a search, but Smook's body was not recovered. The cruise had departed Miami on Saturday, March 7, 2015.

On August 19, 2015, around 16:00, or about 45 minutes after leaving Roatán in Honduras, a 65-year-old female passenger, from San Jose, California, fell or jumped overboard from the 9th or 11th deck. Two hours later her body was found 5 mi (8.0 km) from Roatán.

On October 14, 2017, at 8:15, while passengers were disembarking in Miami, 8-year-old Zion Smith, from the Bahamas, fell from the 5th floor to the 3rd floor of the Old Glory Atrium. CPR was started immediately and paramedics took her to Ryder Trauma Center where she later died.

On July 1, 2018, Carnival Glory rescued a crew member who went overboard on Norwegian Getaway the day before. A 33-year-old male Filipino was found and rescued 21 miles north of Cuba.

On December 20, 2019, while maneuvering to dock in Cozumel she collided with Carnival Legend, which was already docked. Six passengers on board Carnival Glory sustained minor injuries. The cruise line attributed the incident to "spontaneous wind gusts and strong currents." The restaurant that was located in the affected area of Carnival Glory was closed until major repairs could be done. Despite this, the itineraries for both ships continued as planned.

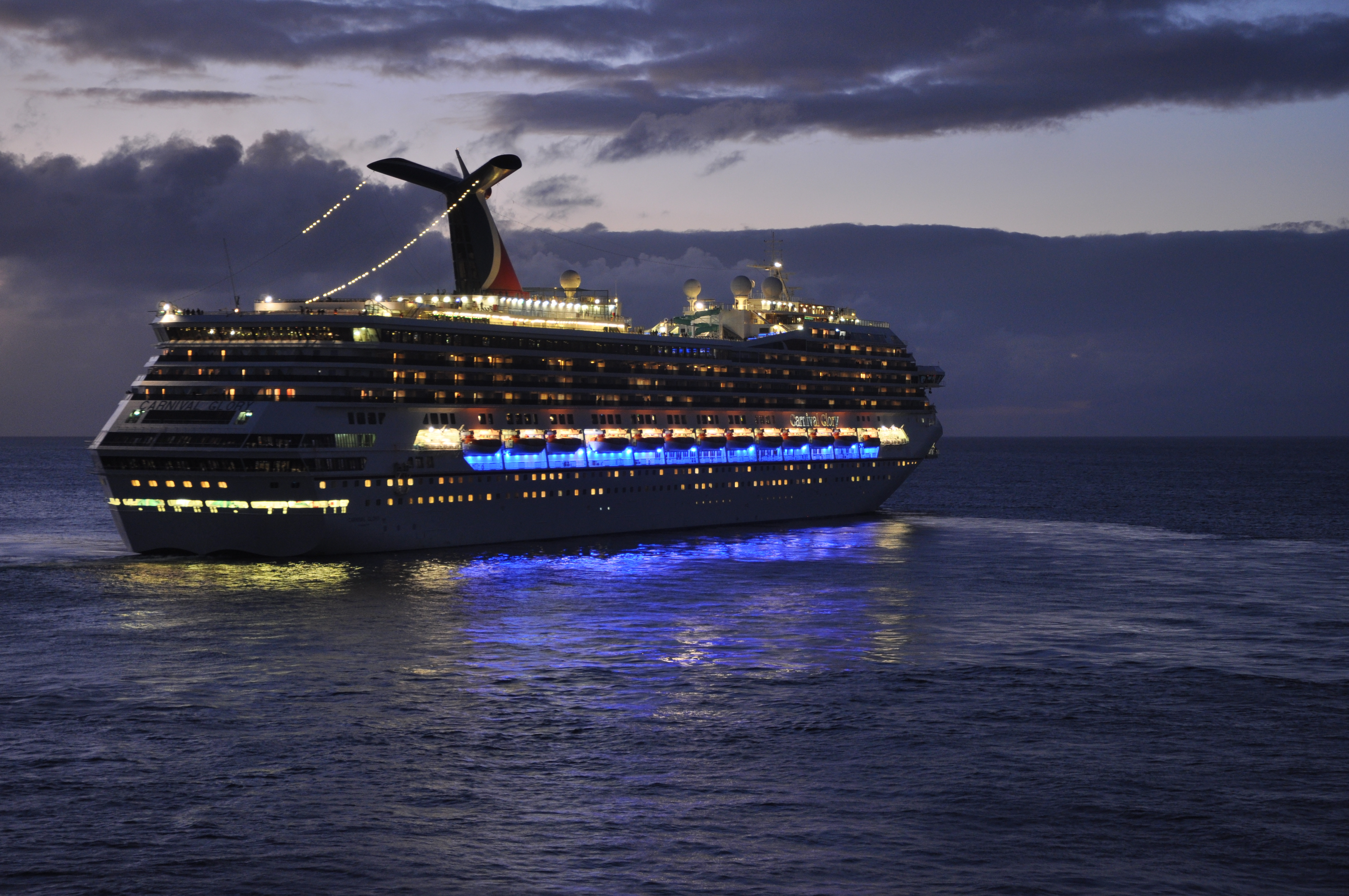
Carnival Glory leaving the port of Grand Turk in The Bahamas on December 24, 2011

== Gallery ==
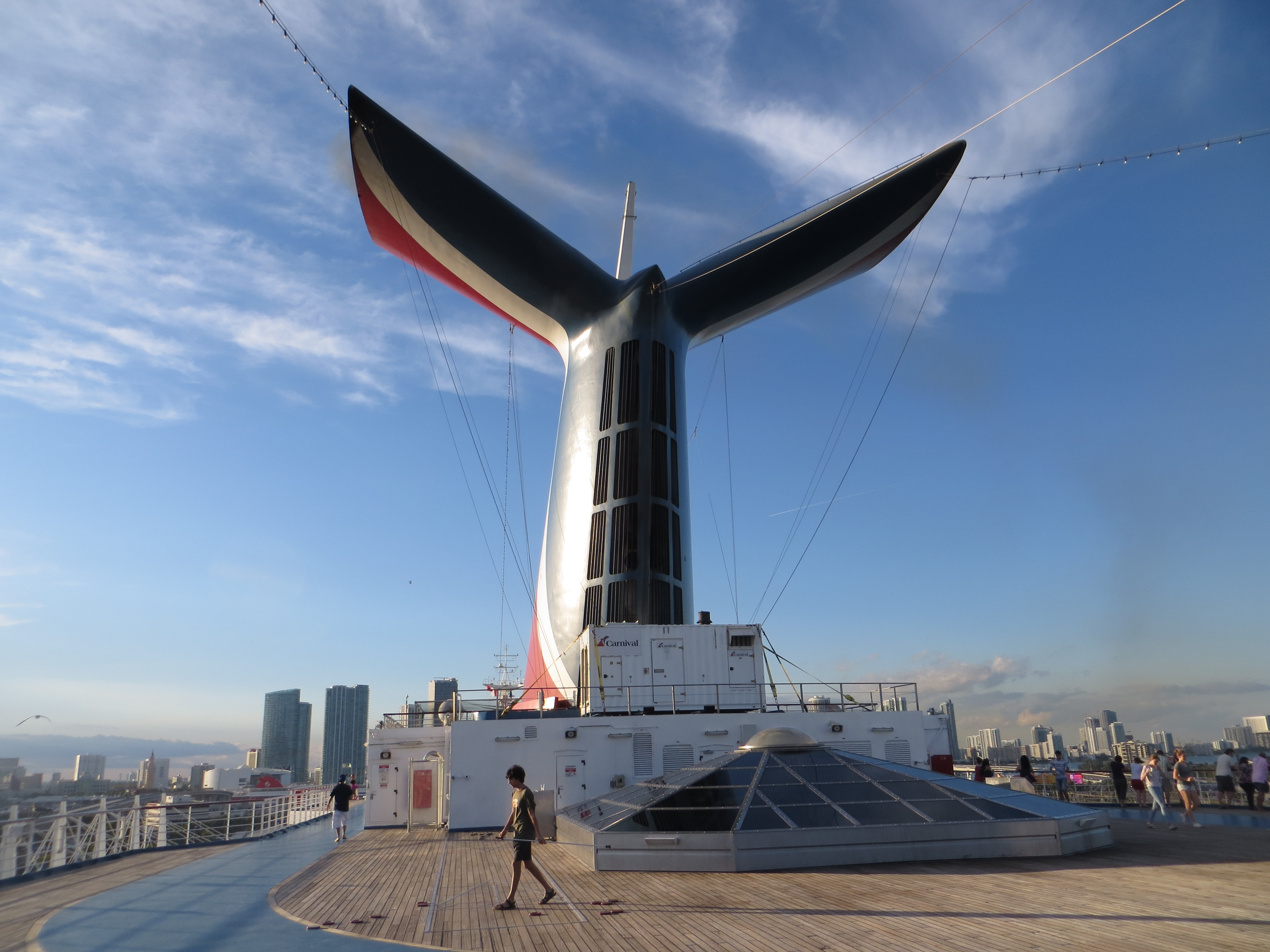
The "whale-tail" funnel, from the back

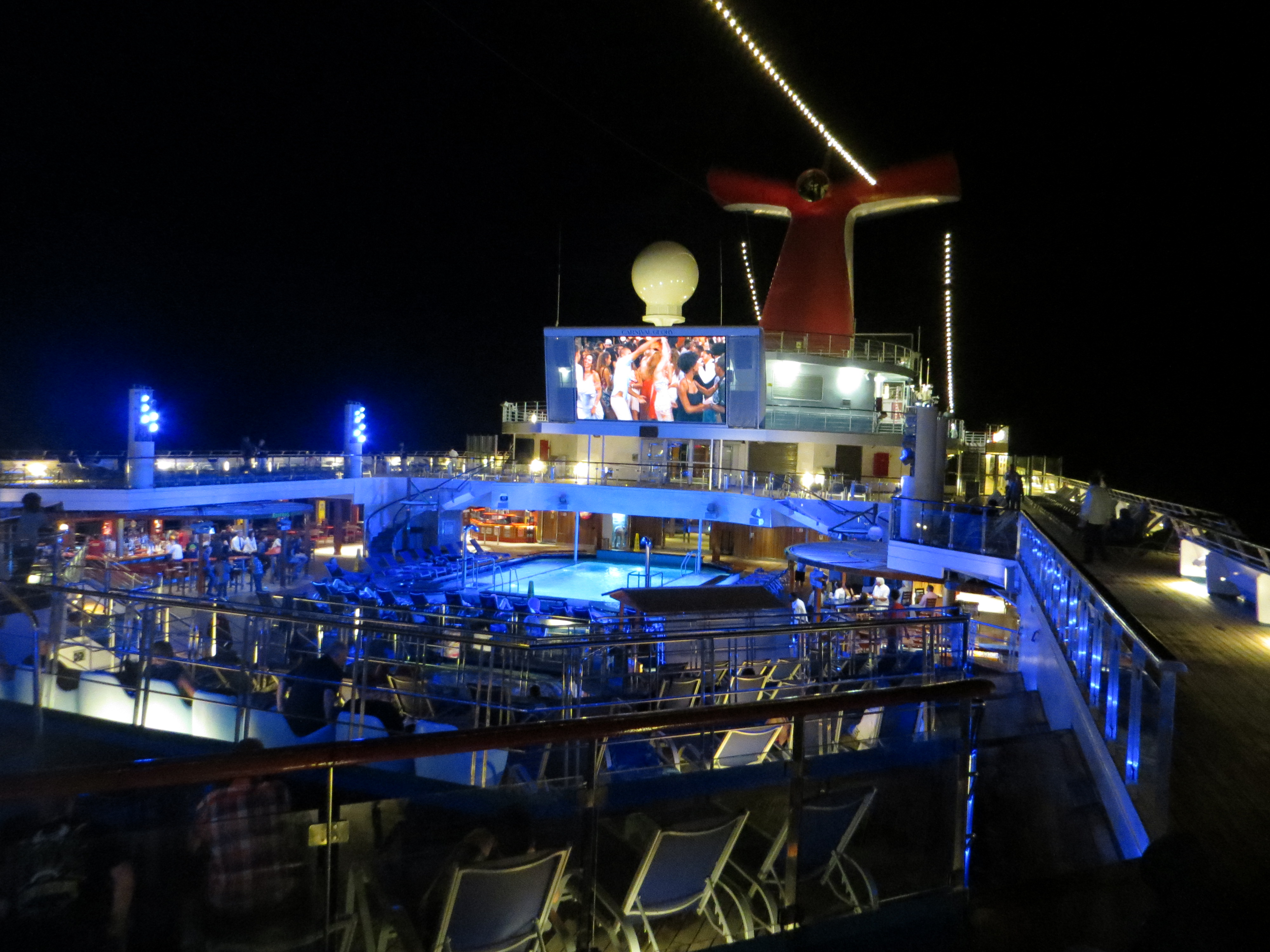
Lido deck, at night

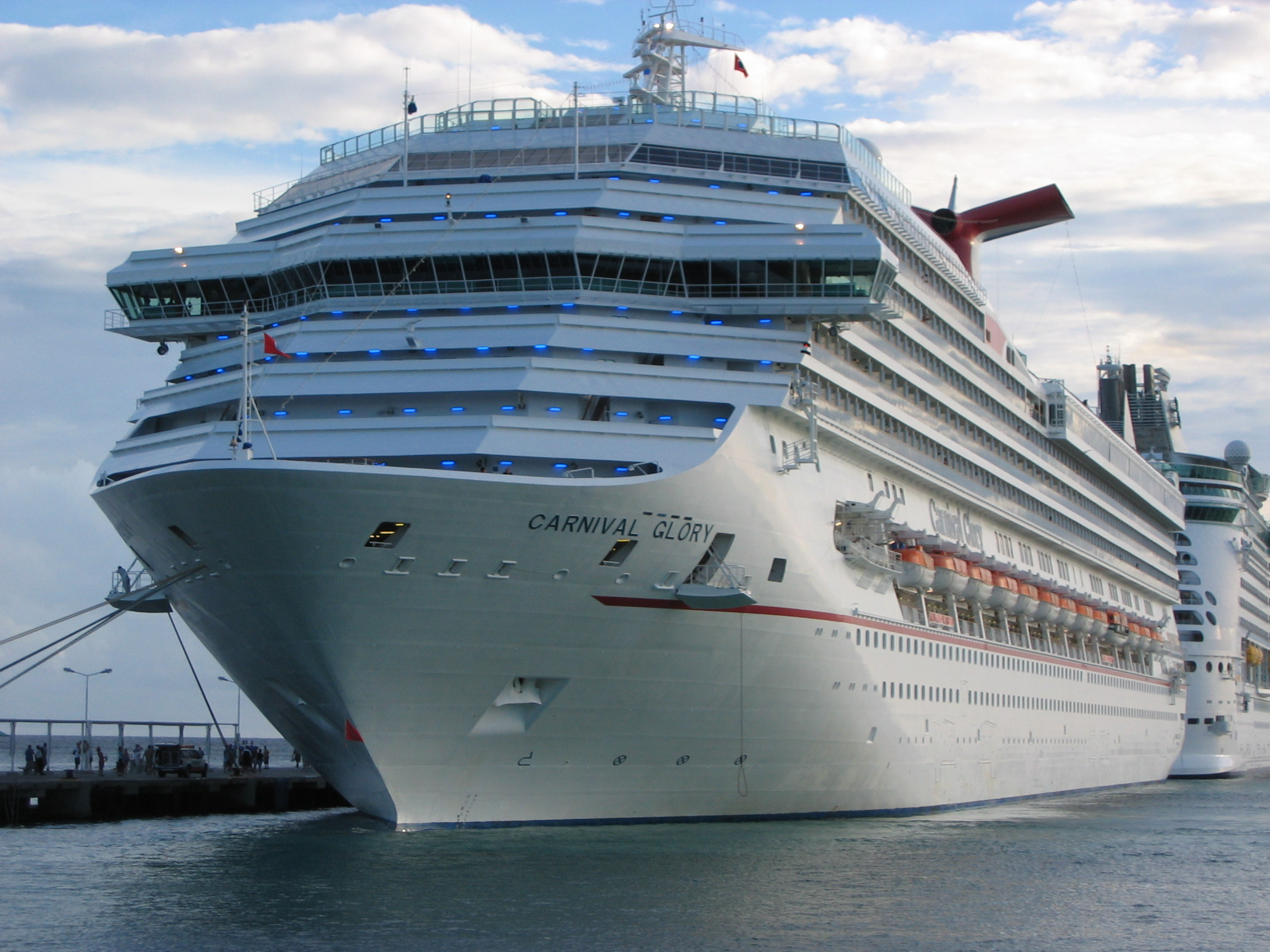
Carnival Glory docked in Saint Martin on October 5, 2005

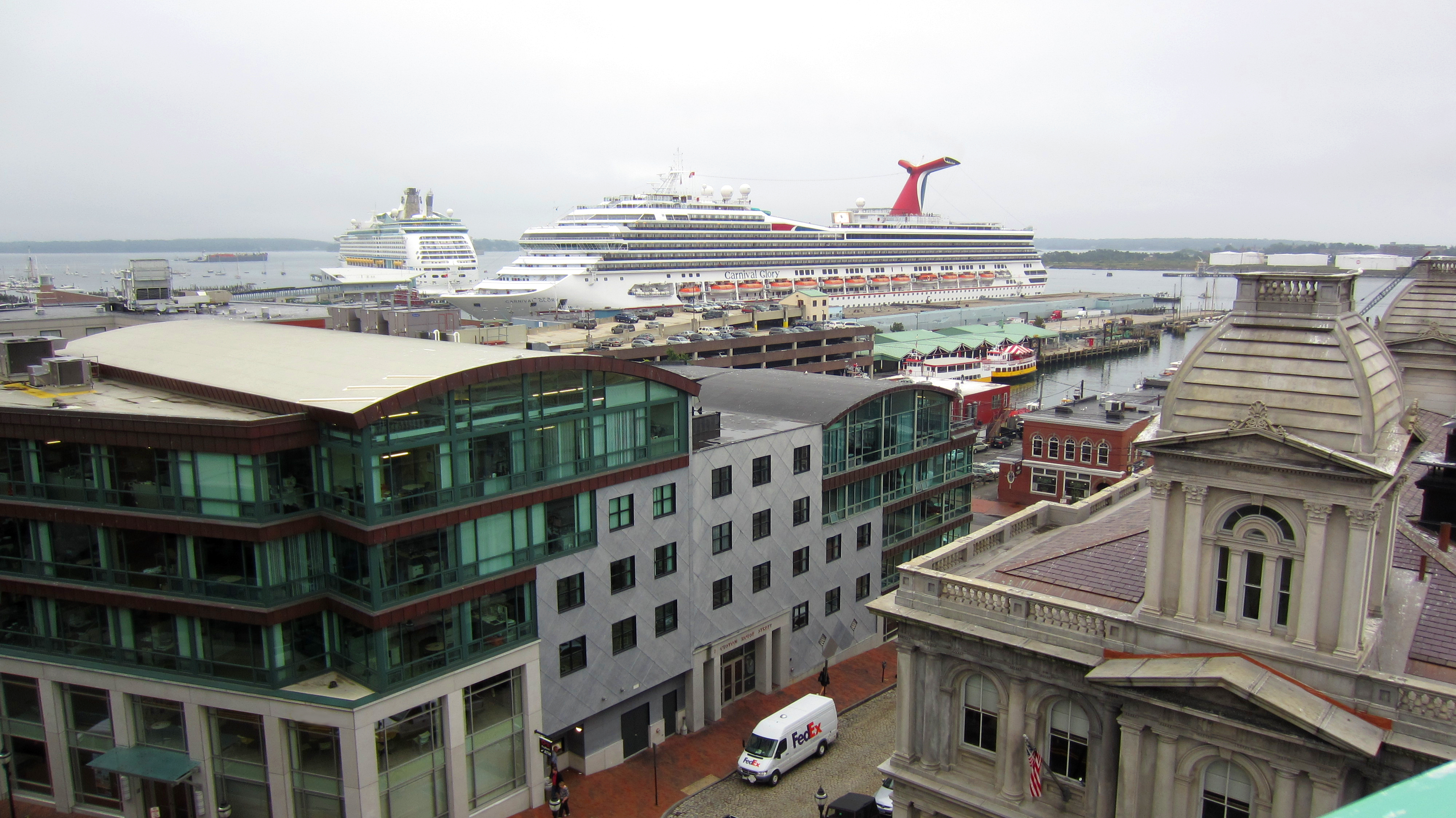
Carnival Glory docked in Portland, Maine.
