= Cruise Confidential =

2008 book by Brian David Bruns

Cruise Confidential: A Hit Below the Waterline: Where the Crew Lives, Eats, Wars, and Parties — One Crazy Year Working on Cruise Ships
- Cruise Confidential cover
- Author: Brian David Bruns
- Cover artist: Brian David Bruns
- Language: English
- Subjects: Ocean travel—Anecdotes; Cruise ships—Employees; Cruise ships—Humor
- Genre: Travel literature
- Set in: Carnival Fantasy; Carnival Conquest; Carnival Legend
- Publisher: Travelers' Tales
- Publication date: September 1, 2008
- Publication place: United States
- Media type: Print
- Pages: 370
- ISBN: 978-1-932361-60-5
- OCLC: 226984710
- Dewey Decimal: 910.4/5
- Followed by: Ship for Brains

Cruise Confidential is the first book in the eponymous series by author Brian David Bruns, published in 2008 by Travelers' Tales (a division of Solas House). Its full title is Cruise Confidential: A Hit Below the Waterline: Where the Crew Lives, Eats, Wars, and Parties — One Crazy Year Working on Cruise Ships.

Cruise Confidential provoked a discussion about the merits of cruise lines' exploitation of workers. The book received positive reviews for its humor and for its giving an insider look at the experience of working on cruise ships. It attracted criticism from reviewers for Bruns' focus on repeatedly describing the attractive women he met on the ship. Bruns wrote three sequels to the book: Ship for Brains (2011), Unsinkable Mister Brown (2012), and High Seas Drifter (2014).

== Plot summary ==
Cruise Confidential narrates the experiences of the author working in the cruise industry. As one of the few Americans in Carnival Cruise Lines' restaurants, he is unprepared for the realities of working in the cruise industry, with long hours and little pay. He worked seven days a week for 14 to 16 hours per day. He is also subjected to a range of challenges from his international colleagues, many of whom deride his decision to work at sea to be with his girlfriend, Bianca, who is a waitress on the ship Carnival Conquest and is from Transylvania, Romania. Bruns describes life in the crew's quarters, called I-95, after the paperwork non-Americans need for American employment. After collaborating to serve the passengers, the crew members who come from numerous countries carouse during the several hours they have left.

Brian begins with his entry into ship life on Carnival Fantasy as a restaurant trainee, then moves up through the ranks to lower level restaurant manager on Carnival Conquest. Far from being the result of hard work, he finds he is an unknowing pawn in a game of international politics on board. Several factions attempt to drive him out of his chosen career, feeling an American is disruptive to the foreign-run hierarchy. Others champion him but invariably only in regards to their own careers. His promotion is ultimately denied and he is sent to Carnival Legend as a waiter, embittered but not beaten. He was the first American waiter in 30 years to complete a full contract lasting eight months without quitting. The climax of the book is his effort at finding a different path to remaining at sea when his restaurant career implodes. His experiences as an art auctioneer and his continued quest for his girlfriend are narrated in the sequels.

Bruns imparts his opinions about cruising. He requests that passengers give good tips and cruise companies give a living wage. He tells passengers that their fare does not give them the right to be rude but they should receive quality customer service. The book includes a glossary with ship terminology and amount of food needed.

== Reception ==
Juneau Empire's wrote, "Funny and appalling at the same time, this gives an insider's view of what it's like to work on a ship." Noelle Stokes praised the book, writing in the Concord Monitor, "Any cruise fanatic like me would love this book." University of Central Oklahoma librarian Jana Atkins, stated, "Some of the stories are cautionary tales of American rudeness, some are heartwarming stories about community and international relations, and others are just R-rated – so beware. This book will change your view of the whole travel industry, even if you never want to take a cruise."

The Gazette's Rob Cline wrote, "The book is seldom laugh-out-loud funny, but it is humorous throughout." A common thread in the book is the Bruns' discussion of the numerous people on board who want to have sex. Bruns emphasizes repeatedly that he found the female passengers and crew to be physically attractive, which Cline found "quite wearying fairly early on". Spud Hilton wrote in the San Francisco Chronicle that "this is a really entertaining true tale" that transparently depicts the operations of a typical cruise ship but found that the book would not appeal to all people. He said the book has "a fair amount of vividly described debauchery and rough language" and that "you stop feeling sorry for the guy—who signed on to follow his girlfriend—after the 500th time he describes some impossibly beautiful Eastern European nymph and wonders what his chances are at scoring with her".

Booklist's David Pitt, who called the book "very funny, behind-the-scenes", penned a positive review. He wrote, "Imagine a combination of Innocents Abroad and The Love Boat, with a dash of Peyton Place, and you'll have a good idea of what to expect: lots of humorous fumbling about as men and women of various nationalities mold themselves into an efficient team without stepping on each others' cultural toes; the glitz and polished shine of a seagoing luxury hotel (contrasted with the sometimes-disgusting living conditions of the crew); and plenty of shenanigans, including raucous parties and, of course, sexual escapades."

== Sequels ==
The Cruise Confidential series is composed of four books:

- Cruise Confidential (2008, Traveler's Tales ISBN 978-1-932361-60-5)
- Ship for Brains (2011, World Waters ISBN 978-0-9745217-7-0)
- Unsinkable Mister Brown (2012, World Waters ISBN 978-0-9745217-6-3)
- High Seas Drifter (2014, World Waters ISBN 978-0-9856635-6-8)

Matt Krueger wrote in The Daily News that Ship for Brains compared to Cruise Confidential "isn't as sharply written, but has a much better title". The book discusses what it is like to be a cruise ship art auctioneer. Midwest Book Review's John Burroughs praised the book, writing, "With a grand dose of humor and a good dose of memoir, Ship for Brains is a fine pick, not to be overlooked."

The third book in the series, Unsinkable Mister Brown, is a memoir about Bruns' time as an auctioneer on cruise ships and is filled with his funny experiences. Able Greenspan penned a positive review of the book for the Midwest Book Review, stating, "The people you see on these cruises and the attraction of high class luxury makes Unsinkable Mister Brown a read that shouldn't be missed for those who love good stories about life and what passes for it." In Foreword Reviews, Jessica Henkle stated "With a candid, no-muss style, Bruns shows just how smitten he and Bianca are with one another" and "Humorous and heartfelt, this book explores the depths one man will dive to for the woman he loves."

== Brian David Bruns ==
Brian David Bruns, the book's author, attended John F. Kennedy High School in Cedar Rapids. Having dreamed of becoming a writer since he was 15 years old, as an adolescent he submitted a book in the fantasy and sorcerer genres to a writing competition for teenagers though did not win. Bruns attended the University of Northern Iowa, where he graduated with an art history degree. Prior to his travels, he had lived for 25 years in Iowa. Bruns started a Reno, Nevada-based medical records software company which had to shut down owing to the weak economy. Bruns met Bianca, a Romanian woman who was a cruise ship employee, through a former employee who connected them. He began working on cruise ships to be with her, starting his cruise ship career with Carnival Cruise Lines when he was 30 years old. Bruns spent four years working on cruise ships with about one year as a waiter and three years as an art auctioneer. He lived in Romania while on break from his cruise ship contracts. Bruns' relationship with Bianca lasted four years as she wanted to stay in Romania and he had no interest in moving there permanently. Fluent in Romanian, Bruns met another Romanian woman, Aurelia, who was employed in a cruise ship casino. After they worked together on ships for a year, Bruns and Aurelia got married on Valentine's Day in 2007 in Reno. Around 2009, the couple moved to Las Vegas and in 2015 they lived in Summerlin, Nevada in the Las Vegas Valley. In 2015, Bruns published a horror book titled In the House of Leviathan.

== Awards ==
- Book of the Year, Benjamin Franklin Awards (2009)
- Book of the Year, ForeWord Awards (2009)
- New England Book Festival, finalist (2008)
