= Carnival Valor =

Conquest-class cruise ship

- Carnival Valor in 2025

History
- Name: Carnival Valor
- Owner: Carnival Corporation & plc
- Operator: Carnival Cruise Line
- Port of registry: Panama City, Panama
- Builder: Fincantieri; Monfalcone, Italy
- Cost: US$500 million
- Yard number: 6082
- Launched: March 27, 2004
- Sponsored by: Katie Couric
- Christened: December 17, 2004
- Maiden voyage: 2004
- In service: December 2004–present
- Identification: Call sign: H3VR; IMO number: 9236389; MMSI number: 354298000
- Status: In service

General characteristics
- Class & type: Conquest-class cruise ship
- Tonnage: 110,000 GT
- Length: 952 ft (290.2 m)
- Beam: 116 ft (35.4 m)
- Draft: 27 ft (8.2 m)
- Decks: 13
- Installed power: 63,400 kW (85,000 hp)
- Propulsion: Diesel-electric; two shafts
- Speed: 22.5 knots (41.7 km/h; 25.9 mph)
- Capacity: 2,974 passengers
- Crew: 1,180

Carnival Valor is a post-Panamax Conquest-class cruise ship operated by Carnival Cruise Line. The vessel was built by Fincantieri at its Monfalcone shipyard in Friuli-Venezia Giulia (northern Italy). She was floated out on March 27, 2004, and christened by American journalist Katie Couric in Miami on December 17, 2004.

== History ==
The 952-foot (290 m) vessel can hold up to 1,180 crew members and 2,974 guests. The ship's homeport is New Orleans, Louisiana.

Carnival Valor sails four- and five-night itineraries to the Caribbean. Some of Carnival Valor's public areas were refurbished during a drydock from April 23 through May 8, 2016. In 2017, the ship earned a perfect health score of 100 from the Centers for Disease Control and Prevention. It was part of the agency's Vessel Sanitation Program, whose purpose is to prevent the transmission and spread of gastrointestinal disease.

On February 13, 2020, a rock music–themed cruise, known as ShipRocked, took place onboard Carnival Valor. Performers included Lzzy Hale and her band Halestorm, Alter Bridge, and Beartooth.

== Port calls ==
On September 4, 2018, due to heavy rain and flooding in Galveston, Texas, Carnival Valor's departure was delayed.

On January 23, 2019, the ship lost power at sea for an hour when she left Galveston on her way to Cozumel. On May 10, 2019, the ship repositioned and switched homeports with Carnival Dream to begin short sailings. On July 11, 2019, the ship docked in Mobile, Alabama instead of New Orleans due to a tropical storm.

On April 3, 2020, the ship along with other three cruise ships departed from the port of Gulfport, Mississippi after Governor Tate Reeves announced a “shelter-in-place” order to contain the spread of coronavirus.

== Incidents ==
A crewmember broke his back onboard Carnival Valor in 2014. In September 2018, a Monaco judge ruled that Carnival should pay the crewmember $1.4 million, but the company refused to pay. The crewmember then took the company to a U.S. Federal court in Miami which ruled in his favor; the crewmember won the suit.

On August 3, 2017, the ship contacted the Houston-Galveston Coast Guard station and requested assistance for a woman who was injured from a fall. She was then medically evacuated by helicopter near Galveston after the ship left port for Cozumel.

On October 10, 2019, a 23-year-old male passenger was critically injured when he fell from where he was sitting onto a lower deck. He was medically transported by a Coast Guard Eurocopter MH-65 Dolphin from New Orleans.

On December 22, 2021, a 53-year-old man started experiencing stroke-like symptoms. He was picked up by a Coast Guard MH-65 218 miles (351 km) south of Southwest Pass, Louisiana and transported to New Orleans.

On February 16, 2022, a 32-year-old woman fell overboard while the vessel was around 150 miles (240 km) from the coast of Louisiana when heading to New Orleans after a port call in Cozumel, Mexico.

On 24 November 2022, a 28-year-old-man fell overboard 20 miles off the coast of Louisiana in the Gulf of Mexico. He was found and rescued by a United States Coast Guard helicopter over 15 hours later.

=== Coronavirus pandemic ===
During the coronavirus pandemic, the CDC reported, as early as April 22, 2020, that at least one person tested positive for SARS-CoV-2 after disembarking. On March 15, a 49-year-old man from Ohio tested positive with COVID-19 after displaying symptoms. On April 8, 300 crew members who tested negative for COVID-19 disembarked at the Port of New Orleans.
