= Conquest-class cruise ship =

Class of cruise ships

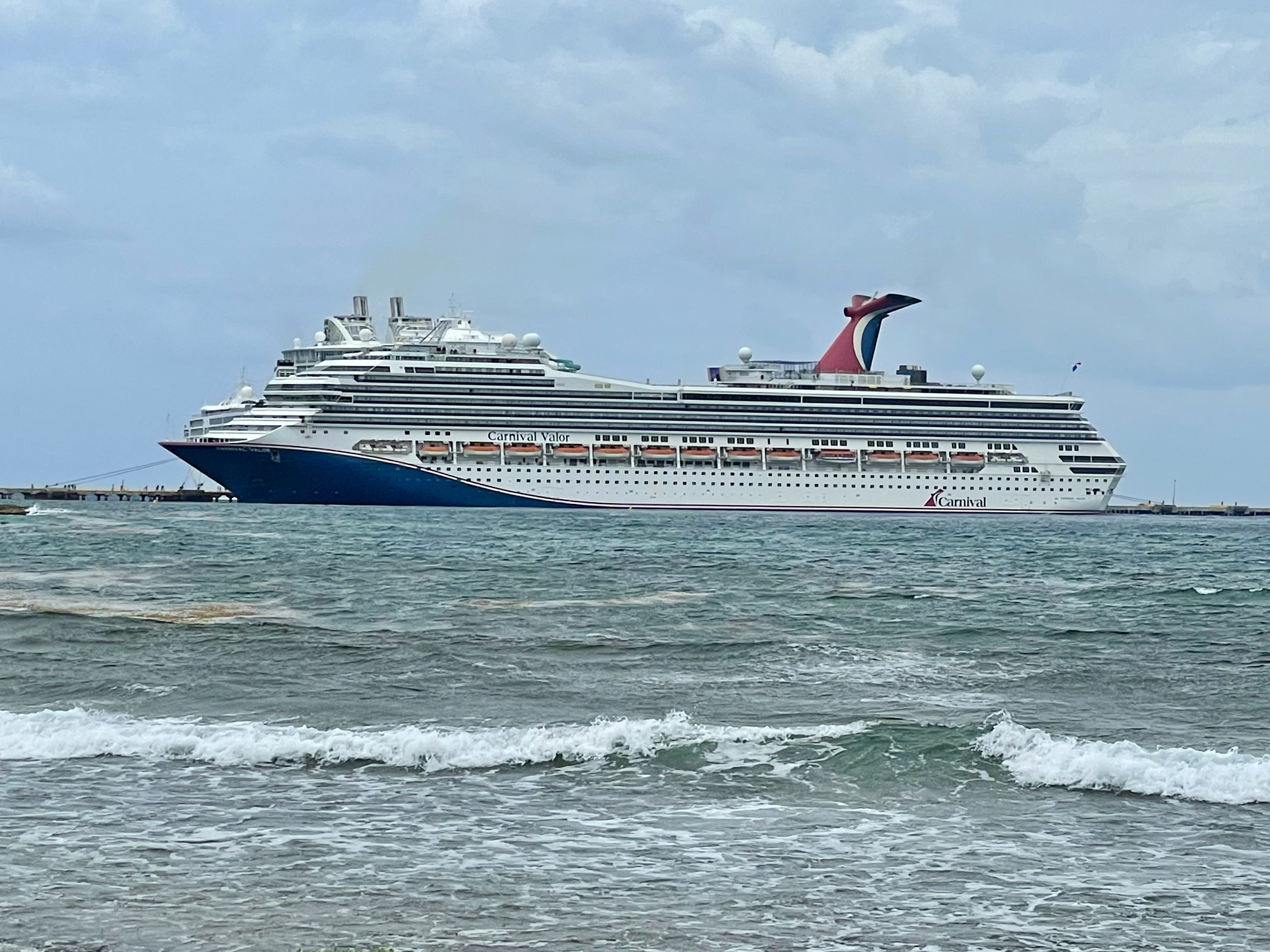
- Carnival Valor in Costa Maya, Mexico on 28 March 2022

Class overview
- Builders: Fincantieri shipyard in Monfalcone, Italy
- Operators: Carnival Cruise Line
- Preceded by: Spirit class
- Succeeded by: Concordia class
- Built: 2002–2007
- In service: 2002–present
- Completed: 5
- Active: 5

General characteristics
- Type: Cruise ship
- Tonnage: 110,000 GT
- Length: 952 ft (290 m)
- Beam: 116 ft (35 m)
- Decks: 13
- Speed: 21 knots (39 km/h; 24 mph)
- Capacity: 2,974 passengers
- Crew: 1,150

The Conquest class is a class of cruise ship owned & subdivision by Carnival Corporation. The Conquest design is an original Carnival design, based on the Destiny class. The Conquest-class design was modified from the Destiny-class design by lengthening the ship by around 59 feet which expanded most of the facilities, added a restaurant above the lido deck and increased the number of passenger cabins. The public rooms in both classes are very similar structurally but vary in décor, with room names that match the ship's theme.

== Ships ==
Ship	In service	Gross tonnage	Homeport	Flag	Notes	Image
Carnival Conquest	2002–present	110,000 GT	Miami, Florida	Panama	Lead ship of the Conquest class	
Carnival Glory	2003–present	110,000 GT	Port Canaveral, Florida	Panama	• In 2019 collided with Carnival Legend, which was already docked, in Cozumel, Mexico	
Carnival Valor	2004–present	110,000 GT	New Orleans, Louisiana Mobile, Alabama	Panama		
Carnival Liberty	2005–present	110,000 GT	New Orleans, Louisiana	Panama	First ship to receive some of the Fun 2.0 amenities	
Carnival Freedom	2007–present	110,000 GT	Port Canaveral, Florida Norfolk, Virginia	Panama	Caught fire in 2023; Caught fire again in 2024	
