= Carnival Liberty =

Cruise ship built in 2005

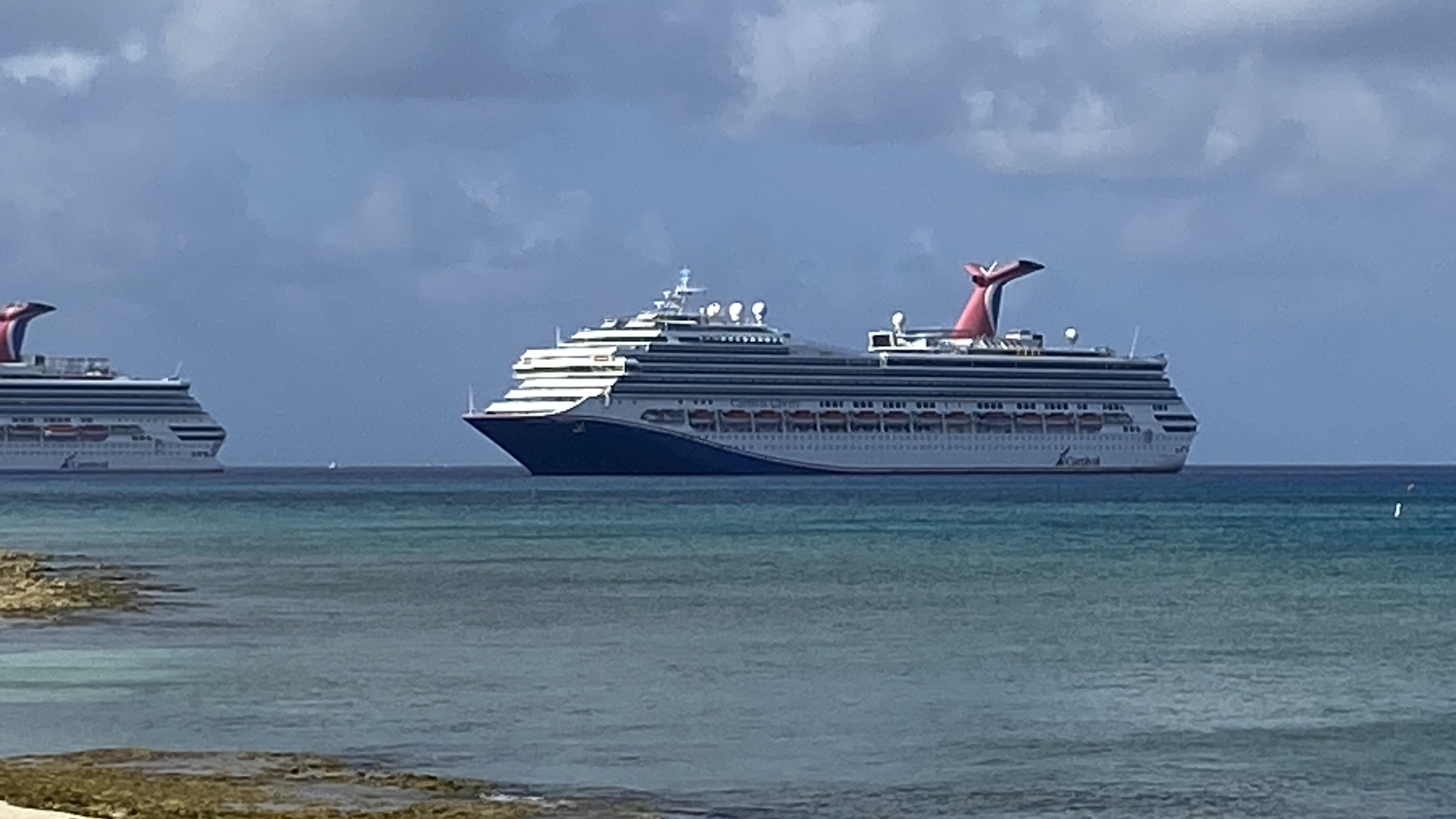
- Carnival Liberty comes back in George Town, Grand Cayman on May 1, 2025

History

Panama
- Name: Carnival Liberty
- Owner: Carnival Corporation & plc
- Operator: Carnival Cruise Line
- Port of registry: Panama City, Panama
- Route: Eastern and Western Caribbean
- Builder: Fincantieri; Monfalcone, Italy
- Cost: US $500 million
- Laid down: October 2, 2003
- Launched: December 3, 2004
- Sponsored by: Mira Sorvino
- Christened: July 19, 2005
- Completed: July 15, 2005
- Maiden voyage: July 20, 2005
- In service: July 2005–present
- Identification: Call sign: HPYE; IMO number: 9278181; MMSI number: 371083000
- Status: In service

General characteristics
- Class & type: Conquest-class cruise ship
- Tonnage: 110,000 GT
- Length: 952 ft (290.2 m)
- Beam: 116 ft (35.4 m)
- Draft: 27 ft (8.2 m)
- Decks: 13 decks forward part of ship has a 14th deck, home of Camp Ocean and the Night Owls programs for kids.
- Installed power: diesel-electric: Six Warstila 12 W 46C diesel engines of 12,600 kW each; two 20 MW electric propulsion motors
- Speed: 22.5 knots (41.7 km/h; 25.9 mph)
- Capacity: 2,974 passengers
- Crew: 1,160
- Notes: post-Panamax

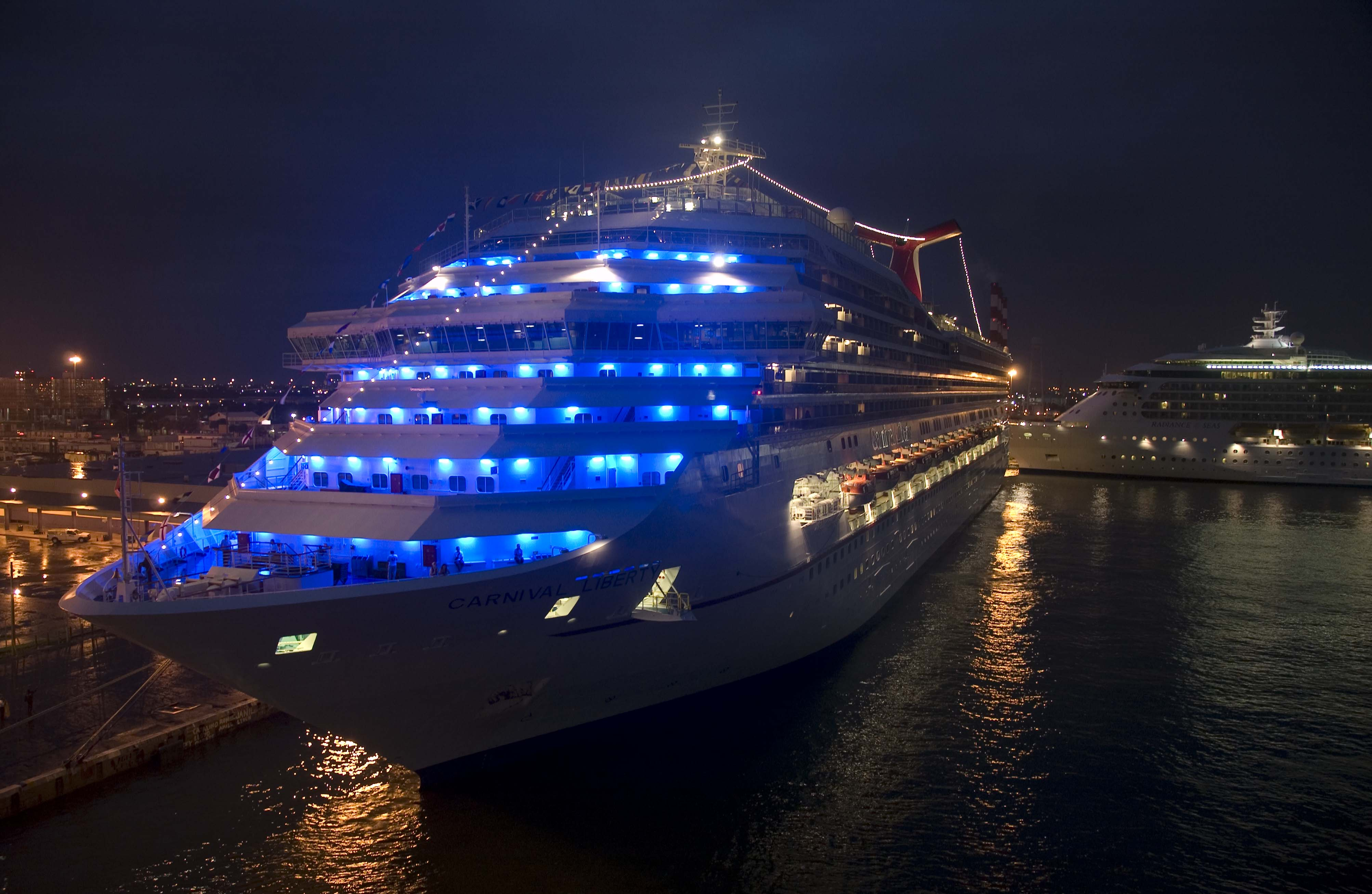
Carnival Liberty docked at Ft. Lauderdale in 2007

Carnival Liberty is a Conquest-class cruise ship operated by Carnival Cruise Line. Built by Fincantieri at its Monfalcone shipyard in Friuli-Venezia Giulia, northern Italy, she was christened by actress Mira Sorvino in Civitavecchia, Italy, on July 19, 2005. Carnival Liberty was the first ship to feature Carnival's Seaside Theater—a 12-foot (3.7 m) high by 22-foot (6.7 m) wide LED screen. Located by the midship pool on the Lido deck, it is used to show movies, sporting events, concerts and other ship programming.

== Incidents ==
=== Norovirus outbreak ===
On November 3, 2006, Carnival Liberty departed Rome, Italy, to Fort Lauderdale (Port Everglades). During the 16-day transatlantic voyage, over 700 people contracted the contagious norovirus illness. On the morning of November 15, Carnival Cruise Lines announced it would shorten the next cruise by two days for an extensive cleaning. Originally, the next cruise was scheduled to depart on November 19 for a six-day cruise. The November 19 cruise was rescheduled to depart Fort Lauderdale on November 21 for a four-day cruise using new ports-of-call. Safety measures were also enacted on a few of the future cruises to prevent further contamination. These safety measures included fully suspending self-service on the buffet lines. When the first cruise after the outbreak ended on November 25, fewer than 60 passengers were reported to have contracted the norovirus.

=== Cuban refugee rescue ===
On the August 22, 2014 sailing, the Carnival Liberty was forced by the storm system that would become Hurricane Cristobal to use a rerouted itinerary (St. Thomas, U.S. Virgin Islands, St. Maarten, San Juan, Puerto Rico, and Grand Turk Island) along a course that would take it close to Cuba. On August 23, a distress signal was received and a small, makeshift styrofoam raft was observed near the ship. The Liberty reversed course and proceeded to pull 11 Cuban refugees from the raft who had requested rescue in the worsening sea conditions. Hundreds of passengers observed the rescue, conducted off the port side. The raft was abandoned in the water as the ship continued on its modified course toward St. Thomas, U.S. Virgin Islands, scheduled for arrival on August 25. The U.S. Coast Guard later ordered a rendezvous where the refugees were offloaded onto a Coast Guard cutter for transfer back to Cuba overnight on the 23rd and 24th.

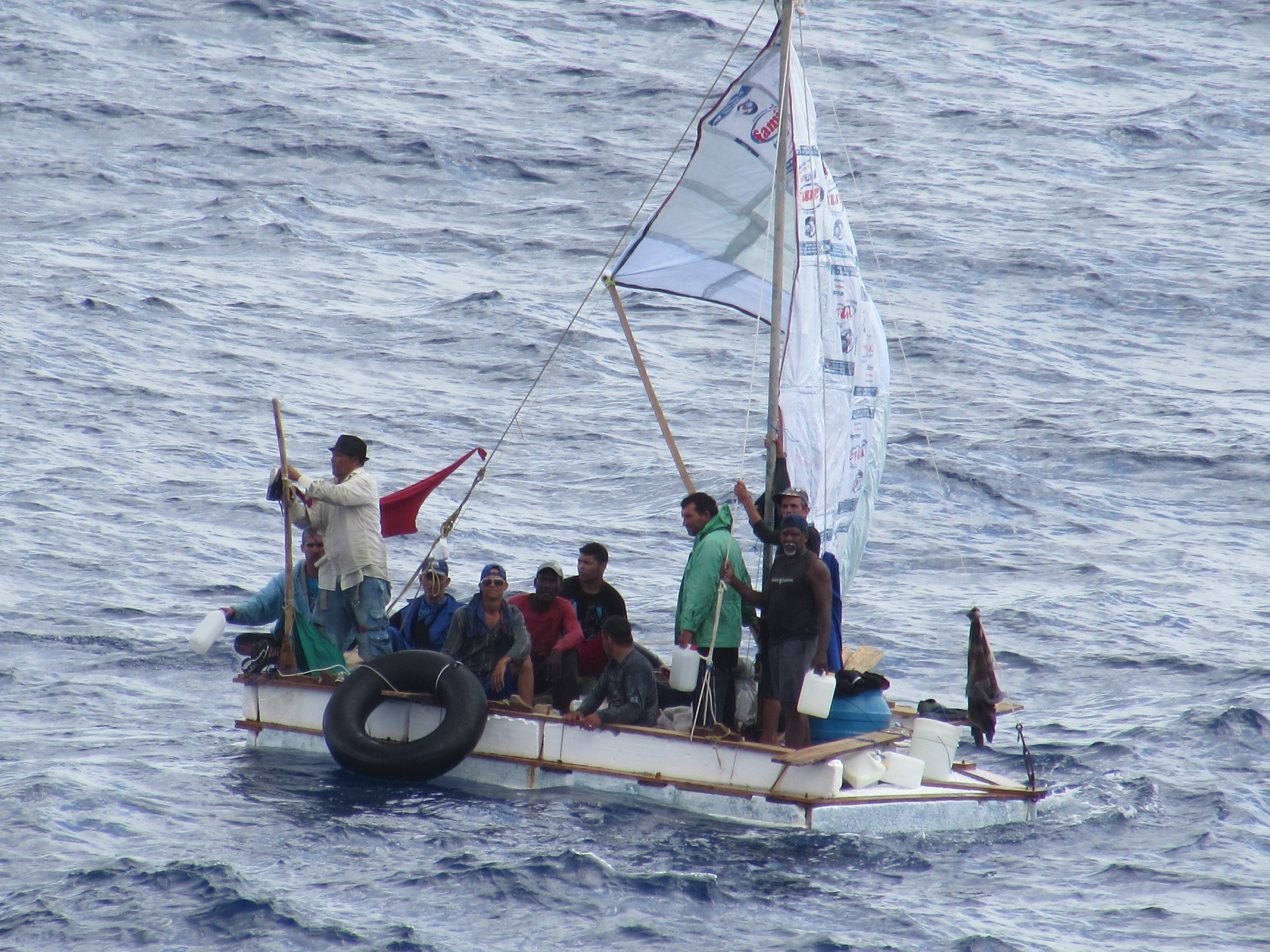
Cuban refugees rescued by the ship

=== Engine room fire in St Thomas ===
On September 7, 2015, Carnival Cruise Lines confirmed in a statement that the U.S. Coast Guard had been called to provide assistance to the ship due to an engine room fire. The incident occurred while the ship was alongside in St. Thomas in the US Virgin Islands. All hotel services on the ship including air conditioning, elevators, toilets and galleys were fully functional and the ship's normal array of activities including entertainment and dining proceeded as normal after passengers were allowed to re-board on the night of September 7. This also caused more vibration than other Carnival ships, and a shorter range due to the decrease in power and stability.

=== Gallery ===
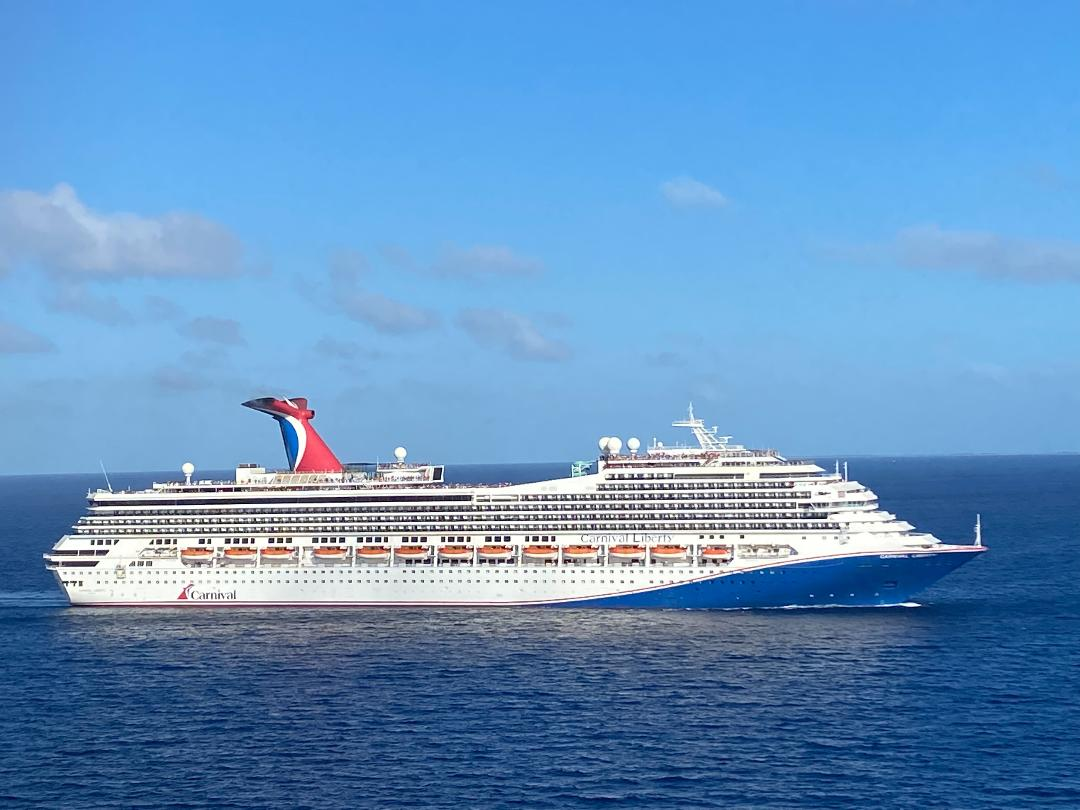
Carnival Liberty anchored off in Nassau, Bahamas, taking part in Carnival's 50th Sailabration funship meet-up on March 9, 2022

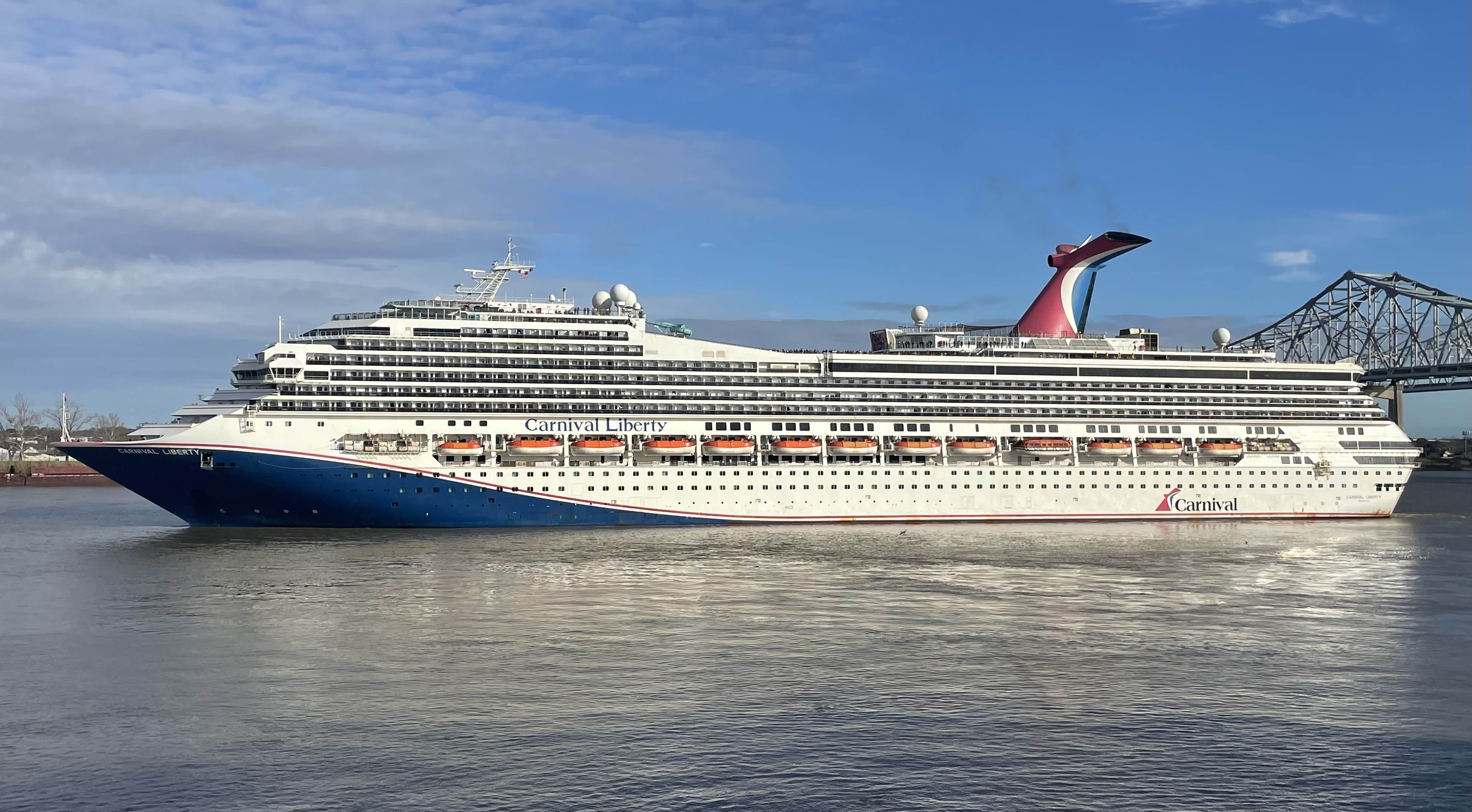
Carnival Liberty departing New Orleans in Louisiana, USA on January 26, 2025

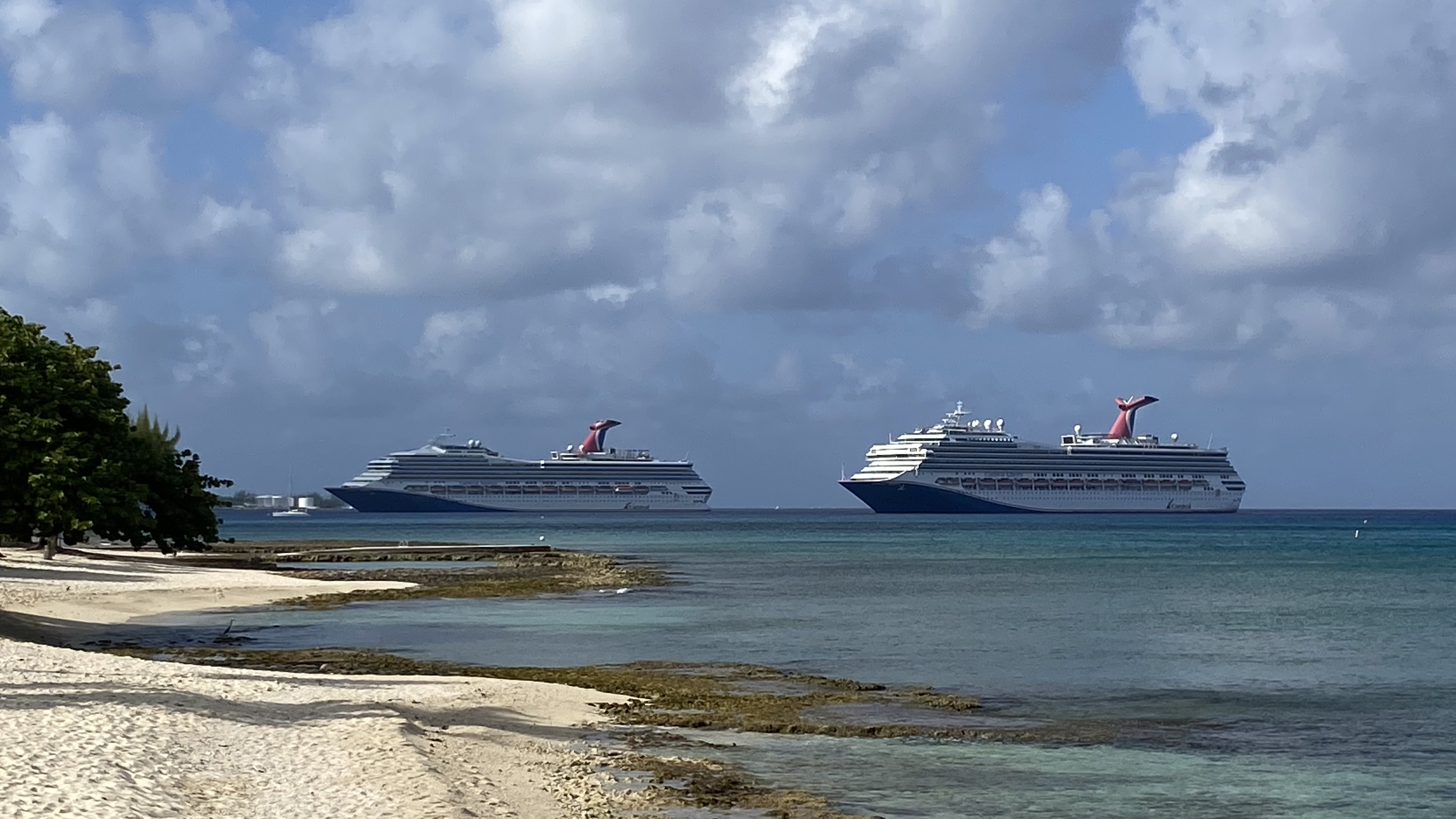
Carnival Liberty anchored in George Town, Grand Cayman with Carnival Sunrise on May 1, 2025
