= Carnival Conquest =

Cruise ship built in 2002

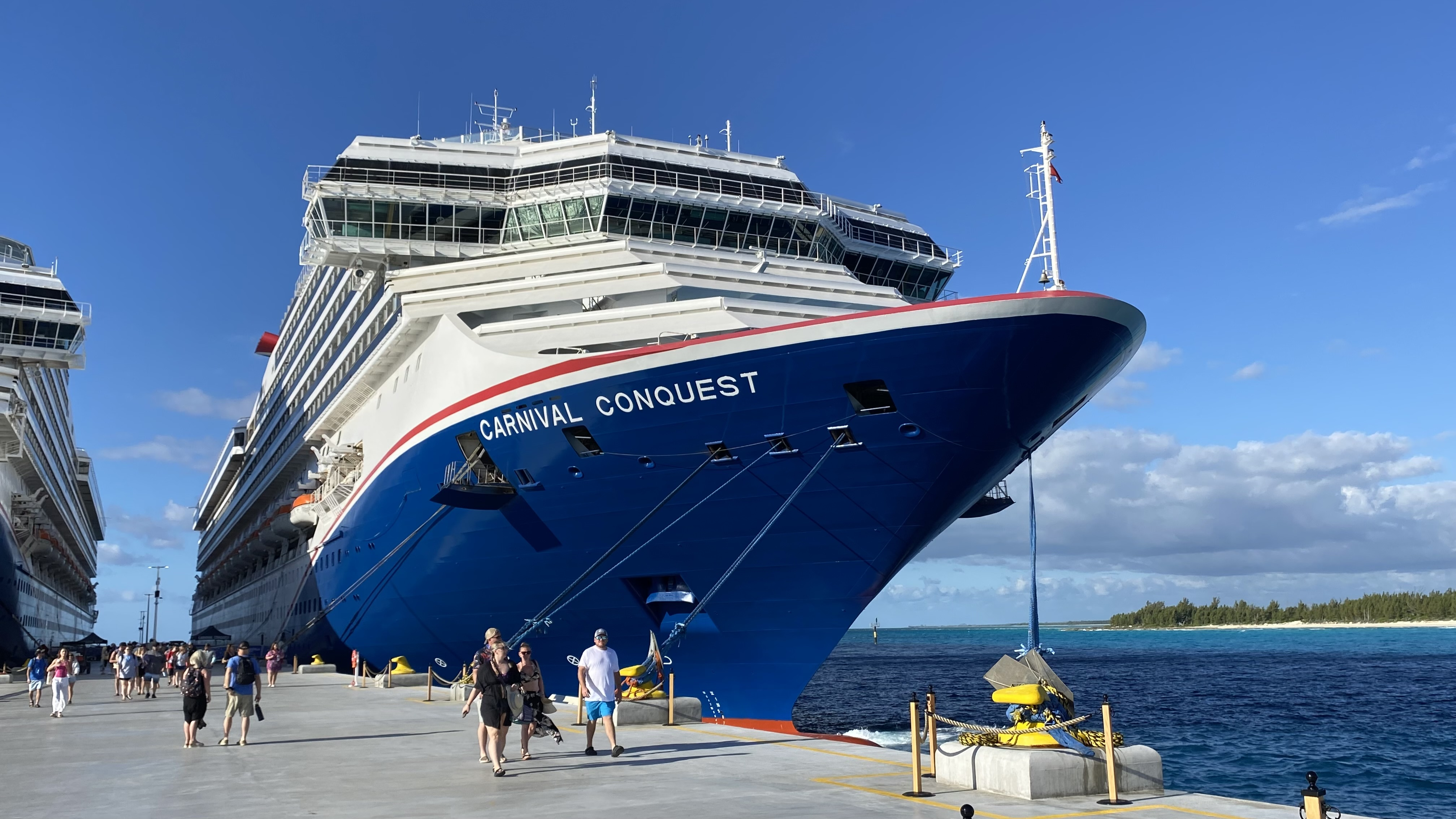
- Carnival Conquest in Celebration Key, Grand Bahama, wearing Carnival’s Blue Bow Livery, 2026

History
- Name: Carnival Conquest
- Owner: Carnival Corporation & plc
- Operator: Carnival Cruise Line
- Port of registry: Panama
- Ordered: 4 August 1998
- Builder: Fincantieri (Monfalcone, Italy)
- Cost: US $500 million
- Laid down: 30 June 1999
- Launched: 1 February 2002
- Sponsored by: Lindy Claiborne Boggs
- Christened: 19 November 2002
- Completed: 25 October 2002
- Maiden voyage: 12 November 2002
- In service: 1 December 2002
- Identification: IMO number: 9198355; Call sign: 3FPQ9; MMSI number: 357657000
- Status: In service

General characteristics
- Class & type: Conquest-class cruise ship
- Tonnage: 110,000 GT
- Length: 953 ft (290.5 m)
- Beam: 116 ft (35.4 m)
- Height: 208 ft (63.4 m)
- Draft: 27 ft (8.2 m)
- Decks: 13 decks
- Installed power: 63,400 kW (85,000 hp)
- Propulsion: Diesel-electric; two propellers
- Speed: 22.5 knots (41.7 km/h; 25.9 mph)
- Capacity: 2,980 passengers
- Crew: 1,150

Carnival Conquest is a cruise ship owned and operated by Carnival Cruise Line. She is the first of her namesake class, whose design is derived from the Destiny class of cruise ships. Sixty percent of her staterooms have ocean views, and sixty percent of those (37% of all cabins) have balconies. The ship's interior decor is of a French Impressionist style designed to complement the port city of New Orleans. Carnival Conquest was renovated in 2009.

The godmother of Carnival Conquest is Lindy Boggs, former US Congresswoman for Louisiana.

The vessel has been homeported at Miami, Florida. On 7 July 2013, the ship was diverted to Mobile, Alabama, after a tugboat sank at New Orleans, causing a closure of the Mississippi River. Carnival then changed the next seven-day cruise roundtrip New Orleans into a six-day cruise from Mobile to New Orleans. Passengers disembarking were provided charter buses to New Orleans.

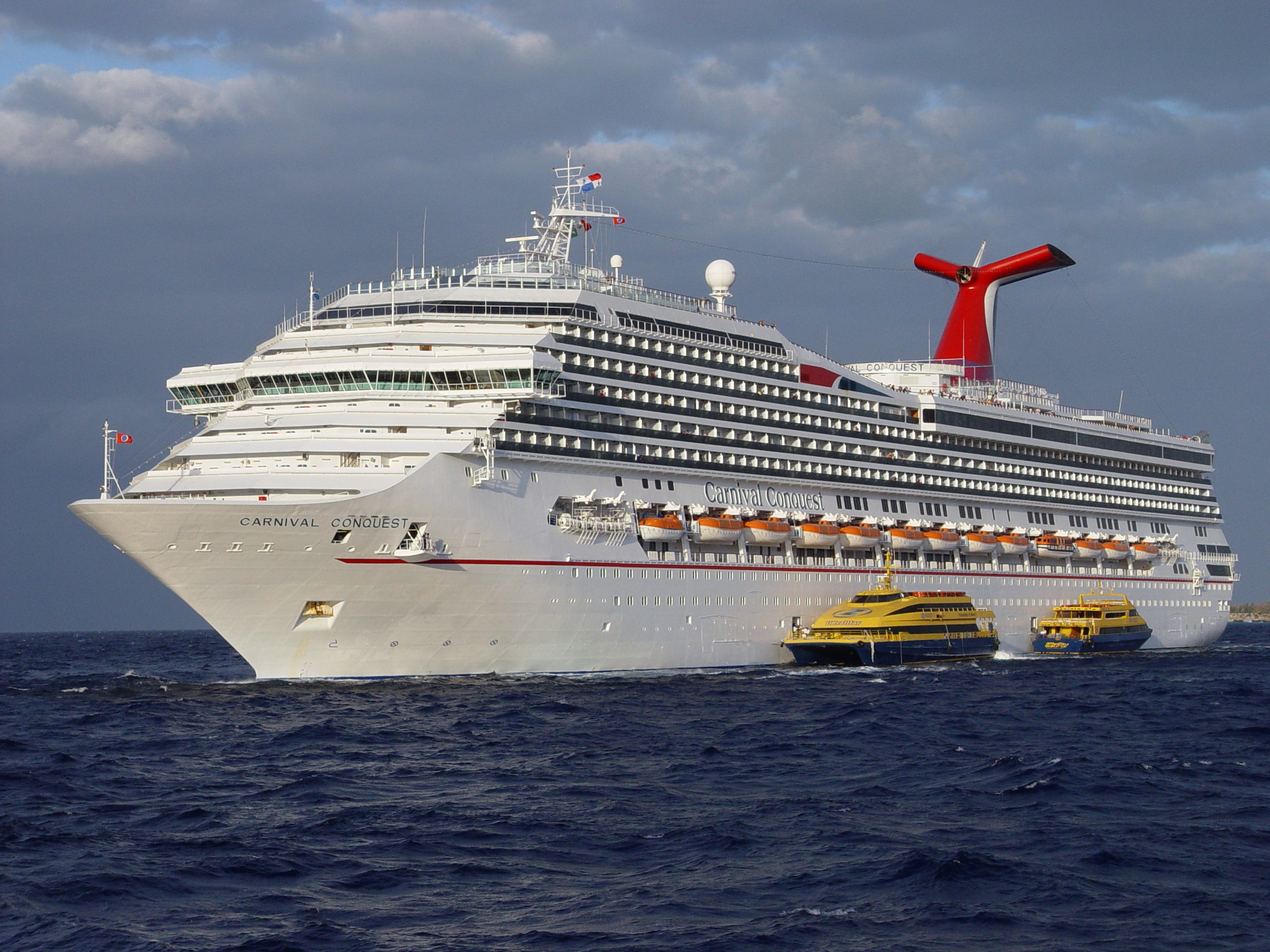
Carnival Conquest docked in Riviera Maya, 2006

== See also ==
- Cruise Confidential
