= MT In =

Aframax crude oil tanker

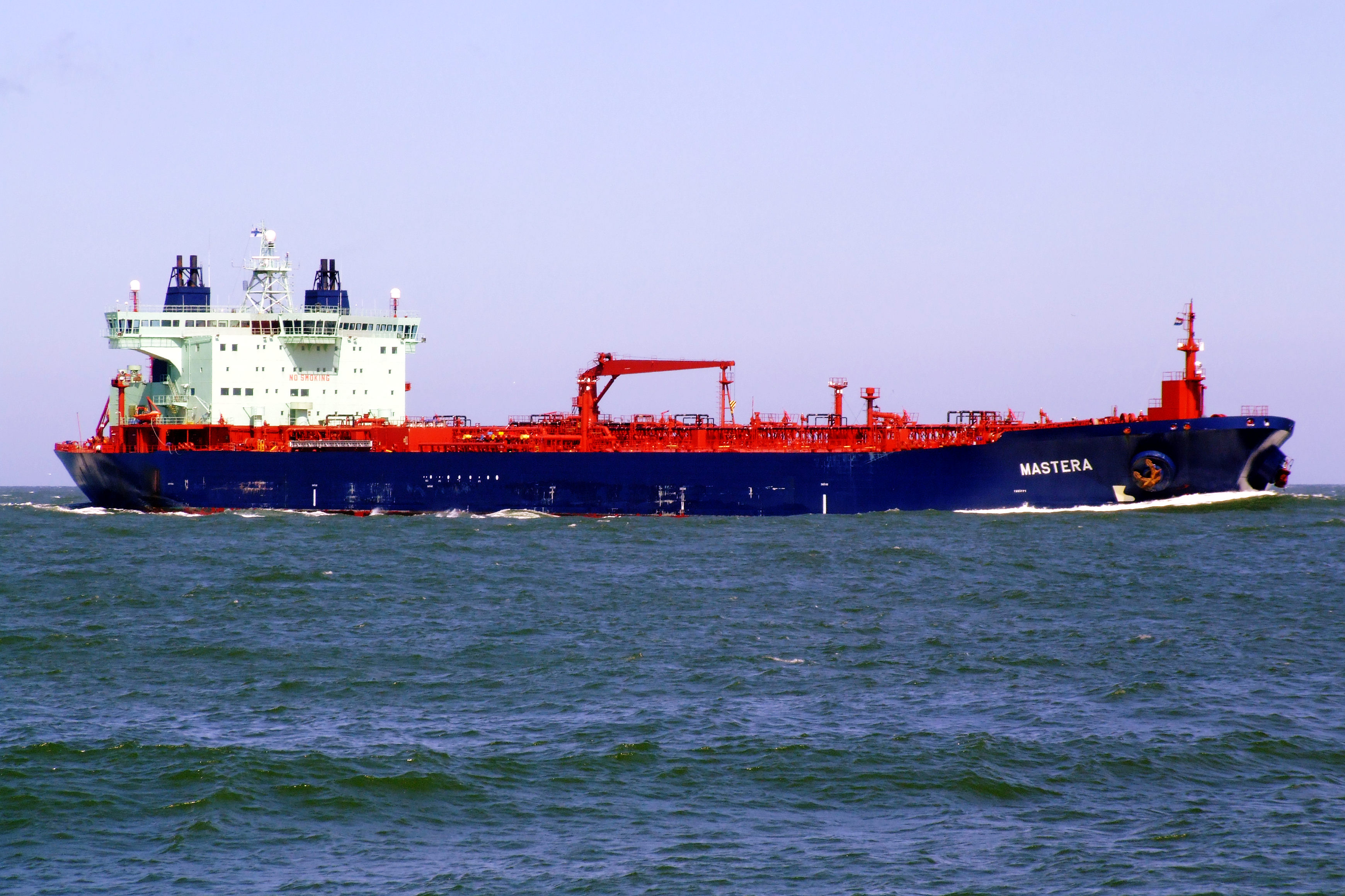
- In (as Mastera) outside the Port of Rotterdam

History
- Name: Mastera (2003–January 2022); Mikines (January–June 2022); Alma (June 2022–2023); Petali (2023–2025); Wind (2025–2026); In (2026–)
- Owner: ABB Credit (2003–2006); SEB Leasing (2006–2014); SSC Maslaiva (2014–2019); SEB Leasing (2019–January 2022); Neste Shipping (January 2022); Omega Shipmanagement (January–February 2022); Neptune Seaway (February–June 2022); Zenaida Seaways (June 2022–2023); Lauriane Shipping Corp (2023–2025); MarisMajesty Maritime Ltd (2025–2026); Peloric Shipping Ltd (2026–)
- Operator: Neste Shipping (2003–2014); OSM Ship Management (2014–2015); Neste Shipping (2014–January 2022); Chemikalien Seetransport (January–February 2022); (otherwise same as operator)
- Port of registry: Porvoo, Finland (2002–2021); Arendal, Norway (2021–2022); Monrovia, Liberia (2022–2025); St. John's, Antigua and Barbuda (2025–present)
- Route: Primorsk–Porvoo–Naantali (until January 2022)
- Ordered: 2001
- Builder: Sumitomo Heavy Industries Ltd., Yokosuka, Japan
- Cost: 60–70 million euro (estimate)
- Yard number: 1286
- Laid down: 6 December 2001
- Launched: 30 September 2002
- Completed: 8 January 2003
- In service: 2003–present
- Identification: Call sign: V2YS9; IMO number: 9235892
- Status: In service

General characteristics
- Type: Crude oil tanker
- Tonnage: 64,259 GT; 30,846 NT; 106,208 DWT
- Length: 252.0 m (826.77 ft) (overall)
- Beam: 44.0 m (144.4 ft)
- Height: 53.1 m (174 ft)
- Draught: 15.3 m (50 ft) (summer); 8.6 m (28 ft) (ballast)
- Depth: 22.5 m (74 ft)
- Ice class: 1A Super
- Installed power: 2 × Wärtsilä 9L38B (2 × 6,0 MW); 2 × Wärtsilä 6L38B (2 × 4.0 MW)
- Propulsion: ABB Azipod (16 MW); Two bow thrusters (2 × 1,750 kW)
- Speed: 15.2 knots (28.2 km/h; 17.5 mph) (max); 13.5 knots (25.0 km/h; 15.5 mph) (service); 3 knots (5.6 km/h; 3.5 mph) (1 m (3.3 ft) ice)
- Crew: 15–20

MT In is an Aframax crude oil tanker. Formerly known as Mastera for almost two decades and briefly as Mikines in early 2022, as Alma until September 2023, as Petali until February 2025, and as Wind until June 2026, she and her sister ship Tempera were the first ships to utilize the double acting tanker (DAT) concept in which the vessel is designed to travel ahead in open water and astern in severe ice conditions. The icebreaking tanker was built to transport crude oil year-round from the Russian oil terminal in Primorsk to Neste Oil refineries in Porvoo and Naantali.

== Concept ==
Although icebreaking cargo ships had been built in the past, their hull forms were always compromises between open water performance and icebreaking capability. A good icebreaking bow, designed to break the ice by bending it under the ship's weight, has very poor open water characteristics and is subjected to slamming in heavy weather while a hydrodynamically efficient bulbous bow greatly increases the ice resistance. However, already in the late 1800s captains operating ships in icebound waters discovered that sometimes it was easier to break through ice by running their vessels astern. This was because the forward-facing propellers generated a water flow that lowered the resistance by reducing friction between the ship's hull and ice. These findings resulted in the adoption of bow propellers in older icebreakers operating in the Great Lakes and the Baltic Sea, but as forward-facing propellers have a very low propulsion efficiency and the steering ability of a ship is greatly reduced when running astern, it could not be considered a main operating mode for merchant ships.

For this reason it was not until the development of electric podded propulsion, ABB's Azipod, that the concept of double acting ships became feasible. The superiority of podded propulsion in icebreaking merchant ships, especially when running astern, was proved when Finnish product tankers Uikku and Lunni were converted to Azipod propulsion in 1993 and 1994, respectively. Even though the ships were originally designed with icebreaking capability in mind, after the conversion ice resistance in level ice when running astern was only 40% of that when breaking ice ahead despite the ships being equipped with an icebreaking bow and not designed to break ice astern.

== History ==
=== Development ===
Following the successful operation of the Azipod-converted tankers Uikku and Lunni in the Northern Sea Route, Kværner Masa-Yards Arctic Research Centre developed the first double acting tanker concept in the early 1990s. The 90,000 DWT tankers were designed to transport oil and gas condensate from the Pechora Sea in the Russian Arctic, where ice conditions during winter can be considered moderate and the ships would operate mainly in astern mode, first to Murmansk and then Rotterdam, where most of the distance can be travelled in open water year round. Other early double acting concepts included a similar ship with an icebreaking bow that would be utilized in summer time when the ship was traveling in areas with low ice concentration but with a risk of colliding with multi-year ice blocks.

In early 2000s Fortum Shipping, the transportation arm of the Finnish energy company Fortum, started a major fleet renewal program to increase the efficiency and reduce the average age of its vessels. The program also included replacing the company's old tankers, such as the 90,000-ton Natura, that were used to transport crude oil to the company's oil refineries in the Gulf of Finland. The old ships had traffic restrictions during the worst part of the winter because of their lower ice class of 1C and could not deliver their cargo all the way to the refineries in Porvoo and Naantali because they were denied icebreaker assistance. When this happened, the oil had to be transported to smaller ships of higher ice class at the edge of the ice — a practice that was both uneconomical and hazardous.

To solve these problems Kværner Masa-Yards Arctic Research Centre developed a new 100,000 DWT Aframax tanker concept together with Fortum Shipping, which ordered two vessels from Sumitomo Heavy Industries in 2001. The new ships were designed to the highest Finnish-Swedish ice class, 1A Super, and to be capable of operating in all ice conditions encountered in the Baltic Sea. The possibility to operate in the Pechora Sea was also taken into account in the design process. Extensive ice model tests confirmed the vessel's operational capability in level ice, rubble fields, ice channels and ridges.

The world's first double acting tanker and the largest 1A Super class oil tanker at that time, Tempera, was delivered from Yokosuka shipyard in late August 2002. She was awarded the Ship Of The Year 2002 award by the Society of Naval Architects of Japan (SNAJ). The second ship, Mastera, was delivered in the following year. Both ships were named after the company's oil products. While the price of the contract was not made public, the company later admitted that the 60–70 million euro estimate was "quite close to the truth". The ships were owned by ABB Credit, which leased them to Fortum for ten years. The leasing business was later sold to SEB Leasing.

=== Career ===
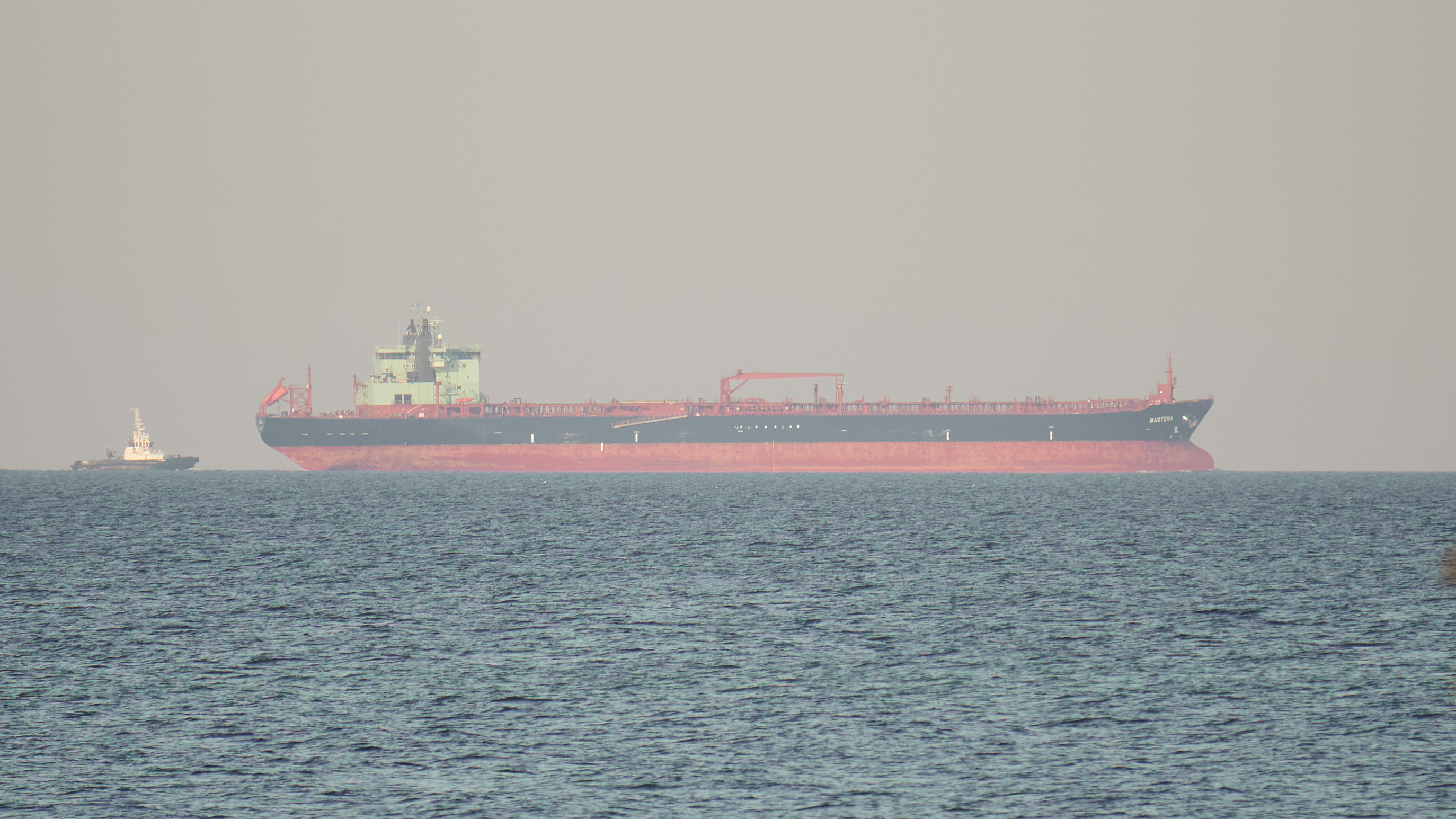
MT Mastera in 2020 near Primorsk

Since the beginning, Tempera and Mastera were used mainly for year-round transportation of crude oil from the Russian oil terminal of Primorsk to company's own oil terminals in Porvoo and Naantali, where they were the only ships capable of operating without delays or problems during the harshest winters. Occasionally they also carried cargoes in the Gulf of Bothnia and even outside the Baltic Sea depending on the amount of oil in the refineries' storage tanks. However, due to draft restrictions the ships could not carry a full cargo of 100,000 tons to the port of Naantali until April 2010 — they had to stop at Porvoo on the way and unload 20,000 tons of oil to reduce the draft of the vessel.

In 2005 Fortum's oil division was transferred to the re-established Neste Oil and the management of the ships, including the double acting tankers, was handed over to a subsidiary company Neste Shipping. On 19 September 2013, Neste Oil announced that it would sell its shipping business and the majority of its ships, including Mastera, to a new company owned by the Finnish insurance company Ilmarinen and the National Emergency Supply Agency. In 2019, Mastera was resold back to SEB Leasing.

Since 2017, Mastera was the only double acting tanker operating in the Baltic Sea after Tempera was sold overseas. While other double acting ships have been built, the tankers operated by Neste Shipping were the only ones equipped with a bulbous bow designed primarily with open water performance in mind — the tankers and container ships built for the Russian Arctic have a more traditional icebreaking bow due to the more severe ice conditions.

In September 2021, Mastera was transferred to the Norwegian International Ship Register. In January 2022, she was renamed Mikines and reflagged to Liberia. In March 2022, the 19-year-old Mikines appeared on list of tonnage sold for demolition, but resumed trading and was renamed Alma in June 2022.

In May 2023, Alma was recognized as one of the oil tankers transmitting a falsified automatic identification system (AIS) to circumvent the 2022 Russian crude oil price cap sanctions.

The ship was renamed Petali in September 2023, Wind in February 2025, and In in June 2026.

== Design ==
=== General characteristics ===
The double acting Aframax tanker is 252.0 metres (826.8 ft) long overall and 237.59 metres (779.5 ft) between perpendiculars. The moulded breadth and depth of her hull are 44.0 metres (144.4 ft) and 22.5 metres (74 ft), respectively, and from keel to mast she measures 53.1 metres (174 ft). Her gross tonnage is 64,259 and net tonnage 30,846, and the deadweight tonnage corresponding to the draft at summer freeboard, 15.3 metres (50 ft), is 106,208 tons, slightly more than that of her sister ship. In ballast, the ship draws only 8.6 metres (28 ft) of water.

The foreship of the tanker is designed for open water performance with a bulbous bow to maximize the hydrodynamic efficiency. The ship is, just like any other ice-strengthened vessel, also capable of running ahead in light ice conditions. The stern is, however, shaped like an icebreaker's bow, and the vessel is designed to operate independently in the most severe ice conditions of the Baltic Sea. For this purpose the ship is also equipped with two bridges for navigating in both directions. The ship is served by a crew of 15 to 20 depending on operating conditions during winter and maintenance work during summer.

The ship is classified by Lloyd's Register of Shipping.

=== Cargo tanks and handling ===
The ship has six pairs of heated, partially epoxy-coated cargo tanks and one pair of fully coated slop tanks, all divided by a longitudinal center bulkhead and protected by double hull, with a combined capacity of 121,158.2 cubic metres (4,278,660 cu ft) at 98% filling. For cargo handling she has three electrically driven cargo oil pumps with a capacity of 3,500 m^{3}/h × 130 m and one cargo oil stripping pump rated for 300 m^{3}/h × 130 m. The cargo can be loaded in 10 hours and discharged in 12 hours. Each cargo tank has two and both slop tanks one automated tank cleaning machines as well as holes for portable tank cleaning machines.

The ship's ballast water capacity of 46,922.4 cubic metres (1,657,050 cu ft) is divided into sixteen segregated ballast tanks, six pairs in the double hull around the cargo tanks, two fore peak tanks and two aft peak tanks. She has two electrically driven ballast pumps rated at 2,500 m^{3}/h × 35 m and 3,000 m^{3}/h × 70 m. The ballast capacity is needed to maintain correct trim especially during drydocking — the empty ship has an aft trim of 3 metres (9.8 ft) and an uneven weight distribution may damage the hull girder.

=== Power and propulsion ===
The ship has diesel-electric powertrain with four main generating sets, two nine-cylinder Wärtsilä 9L38B and two six-cylinder 6L38B four-stroke medium-speed diesel engines, with a combined output of 20 MW (27,000 hp). The main engines are equipped with exhaust gas economizers. In addition Mastera has one auxiliary diesel generator that can be used when the ship is at port. The auxiliary generator, six-cylinder Wärtsilä 6L26A, has an output of 1.7 MW (2,300 hp). While underway at 13.5 knots (25.0 km/h; 15.5 mph), the fuel consumption of the ship's main engines is 56 tons of heavy fuel oil per day when loaded and 40 tons per day in ballast. Her tanks can store 2,890.1 cubic metres (102,060 cu ft) of heavy fuel oil for the main engines, 308.2 cubic metres (10,880 cu ft) of diesel oil for the auxiliary generator, steam boilers and inert gas system, and 63.2 cubic metres (2,230 cu ft) of lubrication oil.

When built, Mastera and her sister ship were the first tankers propelled by ABB Azipod electric azimuth thrusters capable of rotating 360 degrees around the vertical axis. The pulling-type VI2500 pods in these two ships, with a nominal output of 16 MW and 7.8-metre (26 ft) fixed-pitch propellers turning at 86 rpm, are the most powerful ice-strengthened Azipod units ABB has ever produced. The forward-facing propeller increases the propulsion efficiency due to optimal water flow to the propeller and thus improves fuel efficiency. In addition an azimuthing thruster's ability to direct thrust to any direction also results in excellent manoeuvrability characteristics that exceeds those of ships utilizing traditional mechanical shaftlines and rudders. The turning circle of the Azipod-equipped double acting ships is only half a kilometer at full speed, half of that of a traditional oil tanker of the same size. This is a significant safety factor as the stopping distance of a traditional tanker can be up to 2.5 kilometres (1.6 mi).

For maneuvering at low speeds in harbours, the ship is also equipped with two 1,750 kW bow thrusters.

=== Icebreaking capability ===
The icebreaking capability of the double acting tankers proved to be superior to other ships since the beginning — in shuttle service between Primorsk, Russia, and the Finnish refineries the tankers require no icebreaker assistance and have even acted as an icebreaker for other merchant ships that have utilized the wide channel opened by the Aframax tanker. However, this has not been intentional — when the world's largest 1A Super class ice tanker Stena Arctica, also then owned by Neste Shipping, became stuck in ice outside the port of Primorsk during the winter of 2009–2010, a decision was made to leave the assisting to Russian icebreakers.

The ships have performed beyond expectations in both level ice up to 1 metre (3.3 ft) thick, which can be broken in continuous motion at 3 knots (5.6 km/h; 3.5 mph), and ridges up to 13 metres (43 ft) deep, which can be penetrated by either allowing the forward-facing propeller to mill (crush) the ice or breaking the ridge apart with the propeller wash. While the vessels have been immobilized occasionally by pack ice, they have been able to free themselves by using the rotating propeller pod to clear the ice around the hull.
