= Varzuga =

Varzuga may refer to:

- Varzuga (river), a river in Murmansk Oblast, Russia
- Varzuga (rural locality), a rural locality (a selo) in Murmansk Oblast, Russia
- MT Varzuga, a Russian product tanker
