= Indiga (disambiguation) =

Indiga can refer to:

- Indiga, a river in Nenets Autonomous Okrug, Russia
- Indiga (village), in Nenets Autonomous Okrug, Russia
- MT Indiga, Russian tanker
- Indiga (band), Belarusian musical group led by Maryna Shukyurava
