= Serga =

Serga may refer to:

- Serga, Estonia, a village in Setomaa Parish, southeastern Estonia
- Serga (Murmansk Oblast), a river in Murmansk Oblast, Russia
- Serga (Sverdlovsk Oblast), river in Sverdlovsk Oblast, Russia
