= MS Koningsdam =

Cruise ship operated by Holland America Line

Koningsdam
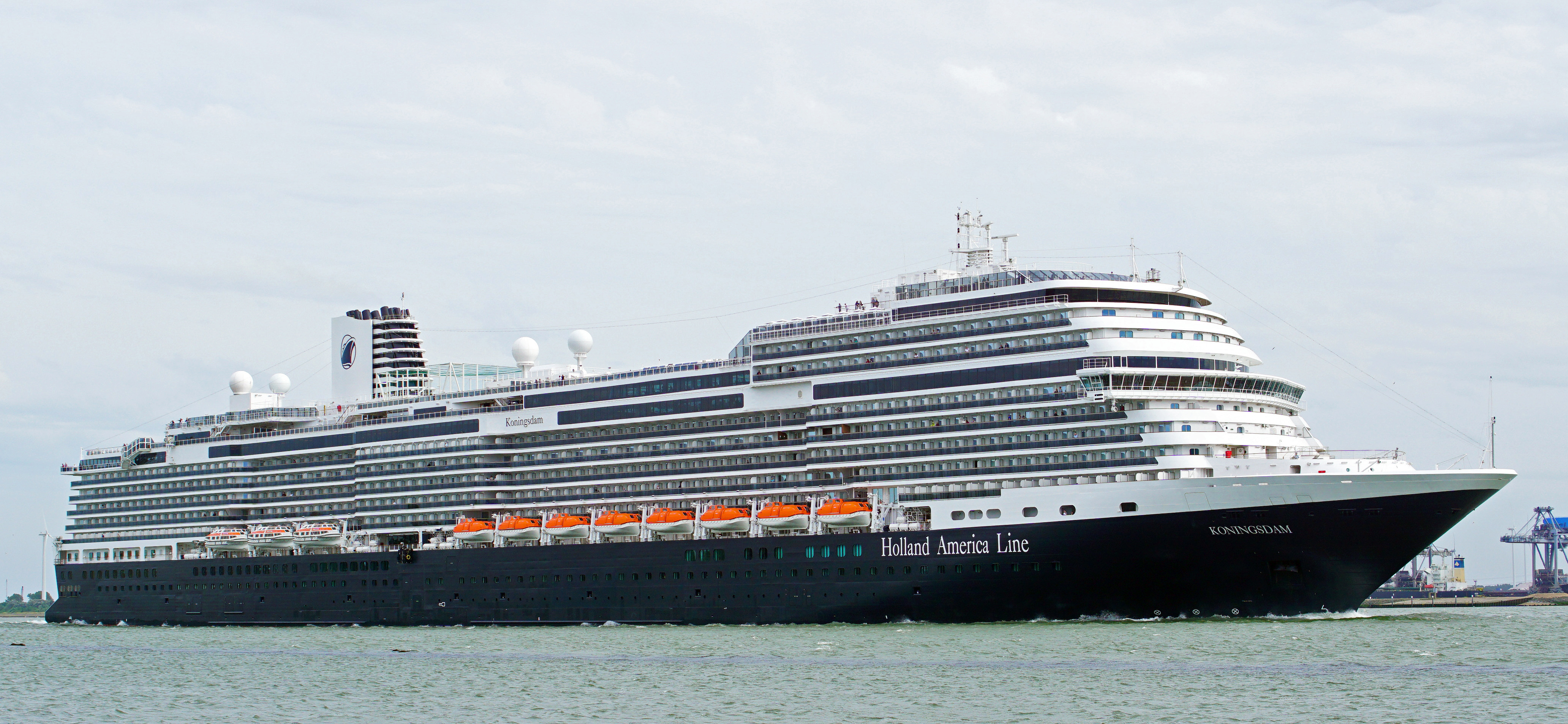
- MS Koningsdam in Rotterdam, 2016

History

Netherlands
- Name: Koningsdam
- Namesake: Willem-Alexander of the Netherlands
- Owner: Carnival Corporation & plc
- Operator: Holland America Line
- Port of registry: Rotterdam, Netherlands
- Ordered: 26 October 2012
- Builder: Fincantieri (Marghera, Italy)
- Yard number: 6241
- Laid down: 22 August 2014
- Launched: March 2015
- Sponsored by: Queen Máxima of the Netherlands
- Christened: 20 May 2016
- Completed: March 2016
- Acquired: 31 March 2016
- In service: 8 April 2016—present
- Identification: Call sign: PBGJ; IMO number: 9692557; MMSI number: 244830547
- Status: In service

General characteristics
- Class & type: Pinnacle-class cruise ship
- Tonnage: 99,863 GT
- Length: 299.65 m (983 ft 1 in)
- Beam: 35 m (114 ft 10 in)
- Draught: 7.95 m (26 ft 1 in)
- Decks: 12
- Installed power: 4 × MaK 12V43C diesel generators producing 12.6 MW (16,900 hp) each
- Propulsion: 2 × ABB AMZ 1250 ZAF 14 MW (19,000 hp) Azipod units
- Speed: Service speed: 18 knots (33 km/h; 21 mph); Maximum: 22 knots (41 km/h; 25 mph)
- Capacity: 2,650 passengers (double occupancy); 4,173 maximum passengers and crew
- Crew: 1,036

MS Koningsdam is a Pinnacle-class cruise ship operated by Holland America Line (HAL), a division of Carnival Corporation & plc. Koningsdam is the lead vessel of HAL's Pinnacle class and the first to be named after the King of the Netherlands, her sister ships include Nieuw Statendam (2018) and Rotterdam (2021), all of which were built by Italian shipbuilder Fincantieri. Two years after the first steel was cut in February 2014 to commence construction, she was delivered to HAL in March 2016 and began operating the following month. At 99,863 GT, she became the largest ship ever commissioned for HAL upon her delivery.

== Design ==
Much of Koningsdam, including the passenger decks, stairwells, and passageways, is influenced by music in naming, decor, and entertainment. Centered on the lower decks are the ship's main entertainment venues, including the main theater and three stages and lounges designed to offer different genres of live music. Dining establishments are also located nearby and cater to different tastes and purposes, including a French bistro, an Italian restaurant, a cooking demonstration venue, a winemaking venue, a dining room, and a café. Atop the ship, features include a spa, pools housed under a magrodome, and a cruise ship poolside theater, as well as additional dining venues, including a buffet and a pan-Asian restaurant.

Koningsdam features a total of 1,331 passenger cabins across 12 decks and 588 crew cabins for a maximum capacity of 4,173 passengers and crew. Of the total amount of cabins, 78.4% have an outside view, and 68.5% have a balcony. She has a length of 299.65 metres (983 ft 1 in), a draft of 7.95 metres (26 ft 1 in), and a beam of 35 metres (114 ft 10 in). She is powered by a diesel-electric genset system, with four MaK engines, each producing 12.6 MW (16,900 hp) to produce a total output of 50.4 megawatts (67,600 hp). Main propulsion is via two ABB Azipods, each driven by a 14 megawatts (19,000 hp) electric motor. The system gives the vessel a service speed of 18 knots (33 km/h; 21 mph) and a maximum speed of 22 knots (41 km/h; 25 mph). Koningsdam was designed to operate at an optimal service speed, with an extended hull and modified bulbous bow to improve the ship's efficiency and glide and reduce resistance. The ship is powered by heavy fuel oil and marine gas oil and equipped with scrubbers from Ecospray Technologies. Enhancements such as fan coil units used to maintain temperatures in public spaces, instead of centralized air conditioning, have allowed the ship to use 20% less power than Nieuw Amsterdam, despite carrying 20% more passengers. In addition, there are 16 150-person lifeboats and six tender boats, all provided by Hatecke. All infrastructure and IT systems are provided by Lufthansa Systems.

== Construction ==
In the early planning stages, HAL had initially slotted a new ship to become a sister ship to Signature-class fleet-mate, Nieuw Amsterdam. However, with the adoption of the Safe Return to Port requirements and the aging concept of the Signature-class design, HAL decided to develop a new prototype.

On 26 October 2012, Carnival Corporation announced that it had ordered two cruise ships from the Italian shipbuilder, Fincantieri, with one of them being a new 2,660-passenger vessel for HAL, initially scheduled for a fall 2015 delivery. At a planned gross tonnage of approximately 99,000 GT, the ship would lead a new class of ships for HAL, dubbed Pinnacle class.

On 4 February 2014, the first steel was cut for the ship at Fincantieri's shipyard in Marghera. On 22 August 2014, the keel-laying ceremony was performed, in which a 680-ton block was lowered into the building dock, marking the beginning of hull assembly. On 15 September 2014, HAL announced the name of the ship would be Koningsdam, in honor of Willem-Alexander, the first King of the Netherlands in over a century. Koningsdam is the first ship in HAL's history to bear the name. On 26 February 2015, the coin ceremony was performed. Tineke Schroder served as the madrina for the event and helped to weld two gold coins bearing the image of Willem-Alexander. Shortly after, in early-March 2015, Koningsdam was floated out from the dry dock and transferred into the outfitting dock for final construction and interior furnishing. In January 2016, Koningsdam performed two sets of sea trials. She first left Marghera on 2 January for three days before arriving at Fincantieri's shipyard in Trieste for standard hull maintenance and evaluation. She then left on 10 January for her second trial and returned to Marghera on 16 January for her finishing touches.

In March 2015, HAL announced the delivery date of Koningsdam would be postponed by approximately one month, from 16 February 2016 to 31 March 2016, after a joint decision made with Fincantieri. Koningsdam was successfully presented and delivered to HAL in Marghera on 31 March 2016. HAL revealed the godmother of Koningsdam would be Her Majesty Queen Máxima of the Netherlands on 18 April 2016, following a long line of HAL tradition of inviting members of the Dutch royal family to christen HAL ships. She christened the vessel on 20 May 2016 in Rotterdam.

== Service history ==
On 19 November 2014, HAL announced that Koningsdam would sail her maiden voyage from Rome, following her re-positioning from the shipyard, on 20 February 2016, calling in Dubrovnik, Corfu, Olympia, and Naples. From then, Koningsdam would continue to sail in the Mediterranean and also cruise from Amsterdam to Northern Europe. In March 2015, with the postponement of the ship's delivery, HAL announced that the maiden voyage would be delayed until 8 April 2016. The remainder of her inaugural season was unchanged and she continued sailing European voyages before she made her North American debut in Fort Lauderdale, Florida in the fall of 2016, sailing round-trip Caribbean itineraries.

Through early-2020, Koningsdam sailed round-trip Caribbean itineraries from Fort Lauderdale. In March 2020, she was scheduled to circumnavigate South America from Fort Lauderdale to Vancouver, before beginning her maiden Alaska season with weekly round-trip itineraries from Vancouver. However, all cruises through fall 2020 had been cancelled due to the COVID-19 pandemic.

After a 19-month operational pause, Koningsdam returned to cruising in October 2021. In December, passengers were prohibited from disembarking in Puerto Vallarta after 21 crew members tested positive for COVID.
