= MS Ryndam =

MS Ryndam may refer to:

- MS Ryndam (1993), sailed as the Pacific Aria and now (2023) sailing as the Celestyal Journey, a cruise ship launched in 1993
- MS Ryndam (2020), renamed MS Rotterdam before launch
