= MT Varzuga =

Russian ice-strengthened tanker

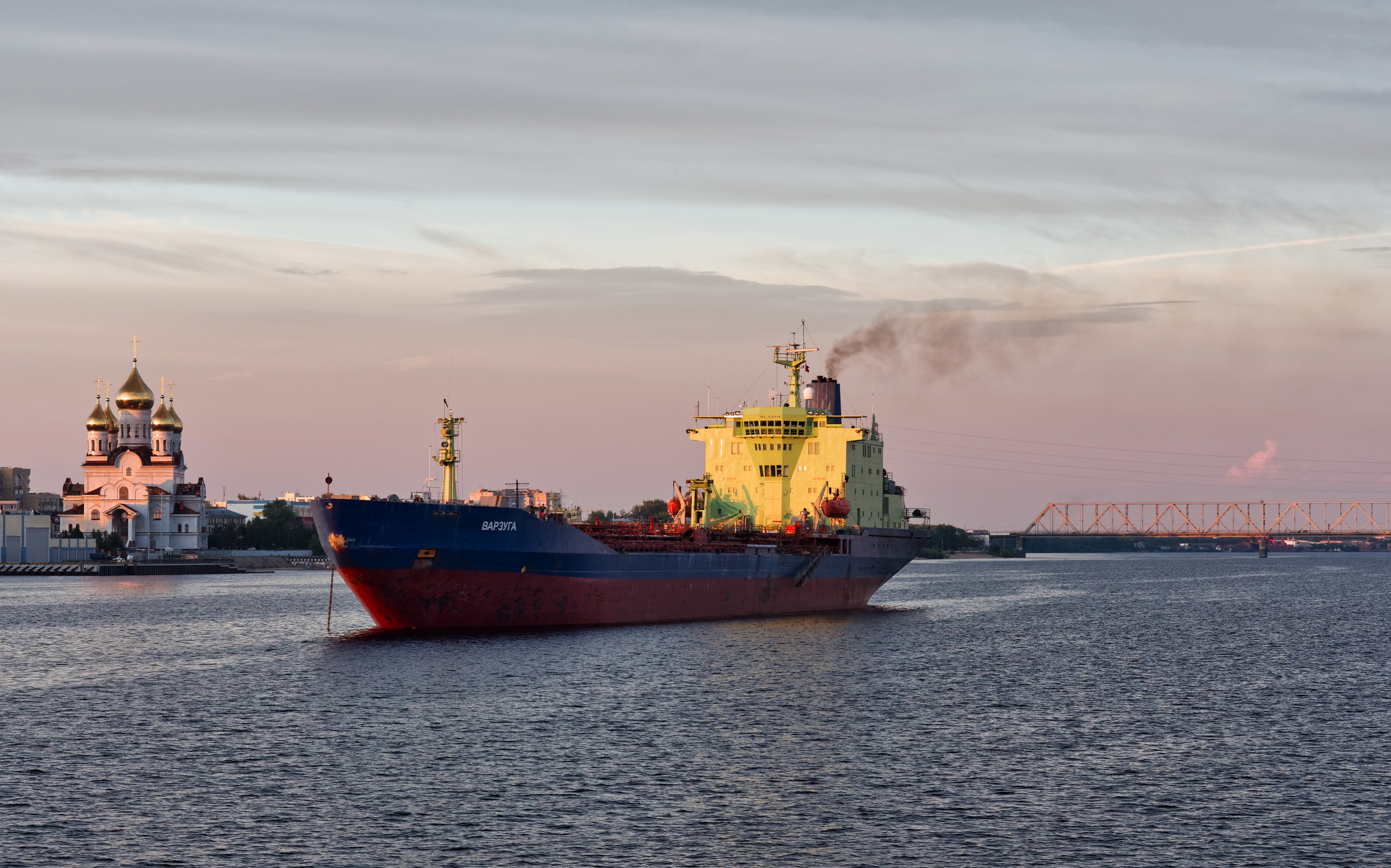
- Varzuga anchored in Northern Dvina River in 2018

History

Finland
- Name: Uikku
- Owner: Neste Oyj (1977–1993); Laivanisännistöyhtiö Nemarc (1993–1994); Laivanisännistöyhtiö Uikku (1994–2003)
- Operator: Neste Oyj (1977–1993); Arctic Shipping Services (Nemarc) (1993–2003)
- Port of registry: Naantali, Finland
- Ordered: February 1973
- Builder: Werft Nobiskrug GmbH (Rendsburg, Germany)
- Yard number: 689
- Laid down: 15 February 1977
- Launched: 2 July 1977
- Completed: 31 October 1977
- In service: 1977–2003
- Fate: Sold to Russia in 2003

Russia
- Name: Varzuga (Варзуга)
- Owner: Murmansk Shipping Company (2003–2019); JSC Bunker Company (2019–2021)
- Port of registry: Murmansk, Russia (2003–2019); Arkhangelsk, Russia (2019–2021)
- In service: 2003–2020
- Identification: IMO number: 7500401; Call sign: UGTL; MMSI number: 273449450
- Fate: Sold for scrap in 2021

General characteristics (after refit)
- Type: Product tanker
- Tonnage: 11,290 GT; 4,937 NT; 16,038 DWT
- Displacement: 22,654 t (22,296 long tons)
- Length: 164.40 m (539 ft) (overall)
- Beam: 22.22 m (73 ft)
- Draught: 9.55 m (31 ft)
- Depth: 12.00 m (39 ft)
- Ice class: 1A Super; RMRS UL
- Installed power: 2 × Wärtsilä Vasa 12V32E (2 × 4,920 kW); 1 × Wärtsilä Vasa 12V22D-HF (1,950 kW)
- Propulsion: Diesel electric; 11.4 MW Azipod unit
- Speed: 17 knots (31 km/h; 20 mph)
- Capacity: 8 cargo tanks, 16,215 m^{3} (98%)

MT Varzuga (Russian: Варзуга) was an ice-strengthened product tanker that sailed under the Finnish flag in 1977–2003 and under the Russian flag in 2003–2021. After her modernization in 1993, she became the first merchant ship to be equipped with Azipod, an electric azimuthing propulsion unit developed in Finland in the late 1980s. She was also the first non-Soviet ship to transit the Northern Sea Route.

== History ==
=== Finland (1977–2003) ===
Uikku, built in 1977 by Werft Nobiskrug GmbH in Rendsburg, Germany, was the last ship of a series of four arctic product tankers ordered by a Finnish oil and petroleum products company Neste Oyj in the 1970s. The ships were given names after Finnish seabirds and the silhouettes of their namesake birds were painted on the side of the ships' superstructure. Lunni (Atlantic puffin) and Sotka (Aythya) were delivered in 1976 and Tiira (tern) and Uikku (grebe) in the following year. Until the 1990s the ships were used mainly to transport oil products in the Baltic Sea.

In 1993 Uikku was chartered to a newly founded Arctic Shipping Services to ship petroleum products in the Arctic Ocean. The new shipping company, based in Murmansk, was a joint operation between two Russian companies, Murmansk Shipping Company and Primorsk Shipping Company, and a Finnish company Nemarc Shipping Oy, which in turn was a joint venture shipping company owned by Neste and Kværner Masa-Yards. The ship's propulsion machinery was modernized for navigation in the harsh ice conditions of the Arctic Ocean in 1993 and her ice-strengthening was increased in 1998. In the following years Uikku operated in the Baltic Sea in winter and in the Northern Sea Route during summer months.

In 1997 Uikku became the first merchant ship under non-Soviet flag to navigate the entire Northern Sea Route. In the following year she took part in Arctic Demonstration and Exploratory Voyage (ARCDEV), a research project funded by the European Union to determine the feasibility of year-around navigation in the Northern Sea Route. Uikku, accompanied by a Russian nuclear-powered icebreaker Rossiya to open the way and another icebreaker, Kapitan Dranitsyn, to provide facilities to 70 researchers from different countries, carried a cargo of gas condensate from Ob river estuary to Europe.

=== Russia (2003–2021) ===
Fortum sold Uikku to Murmansk Shipping Company in 2003 mainly due to the tanker's age exceeding 25 years. She was renamed Varzuga (Варзуга) after the Varzuga River. As Fortum was a state-owned company, the selling of two oil tankers capable of navigating in severe ice conditions resulted in a written question to the Parliament of Finland by Representative Pentti Tiusanen about whether the ships should be retained in Finnish control as they could be used to lighten a grounded oil tanker in harsh winter conditions.

The ship was used for oil transportation in the Arctic Ocean. Along with her sister ship Indiga (ex-Lunni) which was sold to Russians at the same time, she was involved in transporting oil from an oil terminal in the Ob Bay of the Kara Sea through the Kara Gates, the strait between Vaygach and Novaya Zemlya, to FSO Belokamenka in the Kola Bay of the Barents Sea. On 19 July 2010 Varzuga collided with her sister ship Indiga while being assisted by two nuclear-powered icebreakers in difficult ice conditions. The bow of Varzuga and the stern of Indiga were damaged, but neither vessel lost seaworthiness and there were no spills.

Following the bankruptcy of the Murmansk Shipping Company, Varzuga was sold to JSC Bunker Company and registered in Arkhangelsk. The new owner replaced Neste's original light-green-over-dark-blue livery with white for the deckhouse and bright red for the hull. In late March 2020, Varzuga's Azipod propulsion unit malfunctioned and the tanker lost propulsion and steering in the ice-covered Gulf of Ob. The vessel was escorted to the ice edge by nuclear-powered icebreakers and towed to Murmansk.

After having been laid up for a year, Varzuga was reportedly sold for scrap and towed to a shipbreaking yard in Aliağa, Turkey, for recycling. The tow was briefly interrupted when the tanker broke loose in the English Channel and had to be recovered by the French emergency tow vessel Abeille Liberté. After a brief detention, it was agreed to tow Varzuga to Brest for scrapping.

== Design ==
Uikku and her sister ships were designed to be able to navigate in the ice conditions of the Baltic Sea independently without icebreaker assistance and maintain a moderately high speed in ice. To enable this they had more power than an average Baltic tanker and were normally required to use only 50-75% of the full engine power in ice — in normal operation only one of the two main engines was coupled to shaft, with the other remaining in reserve for difficult ice conditions. The highly raked stem, similar to those in traditional icebreakers, was designed to break the ice by bending it downwards under the ship's weight. The ships were also equipped with an air bubbling system to reduce friction between the hull and ice. To prevent pollution in case of grounding, the ships were also built with double hulls and conformed to the IMCO regulations in respect of segregated ballast tanks even though they were regarded only recommendations back then.

=== Modernization ===
Uikku was extensively modernized by Kværner Masa-Yards' Helsinki New Shipyard in 1993 and became the first merchant ship to receive a newly developed electronic azimuthing propulsion unit, Azipod. Before her retrofitting, the only ship equipped with such propulsion was fairway maintenance vessel Seili owned by the Finnish Maritime Administration. Her original MaK 12M551AK main engines (2 × 5737 kW), reduction gearbox, shaft generators, controllable-pitch propeller and rudder were removed and replaced with Wärtsilä Vasa marine generating sets and an 11.4 MW electric propulsion unit. Being one of the early designs, the Azipod unit in Uikku was of the so-called "pushing" type with an aft-facing propeller instead of the more efficient "pulling" set-up used in modern Azipod-equipped ships.

Upgrading the propulsion machinery improved her icebreaking capability considerably especially when running astern. Even though the ship's stern wasn't originally designed or shaped for icebreaking, ice resistance astern in level ice was only 40% of that of when running ahead despite the icebreaking bow. The modernization of Uikku helped to demonstrate the feasibility of the double acting ship (DAS) principle for year-round navigation in ice-covered waters. The refit also increased her speed from 14.5 to 17 knots despite the propulsion power remaining roughly the same.

Uikku's sister ship, Lunni, was similarly modernized in the following year.

In 1998, the ice-strengthening of Uikku was upgraded and increased for the severe ice conditions in the Arctic Ocean, making her hull strength exceed the demands for Finnish-Swedish ice class 1A Super. The hull was also instrumented with strain gauges for the ARCDEV research voyage.
