= Tempera (disambiguation) =

Tempera is a painting medium.

Tempera may also refer to:

- MT Tempera, a Finnish oil tanker
- Tempera (horse), an American Thoroughbred racehorse

== People with the surname ==
- Vince Tempera (born 1946), Italian musician

== See also ==
- Tempura, a Japanese dish of seafood or vegetables
- Tempra
