= MT Indiga =

Russian ice-strengthened tanker

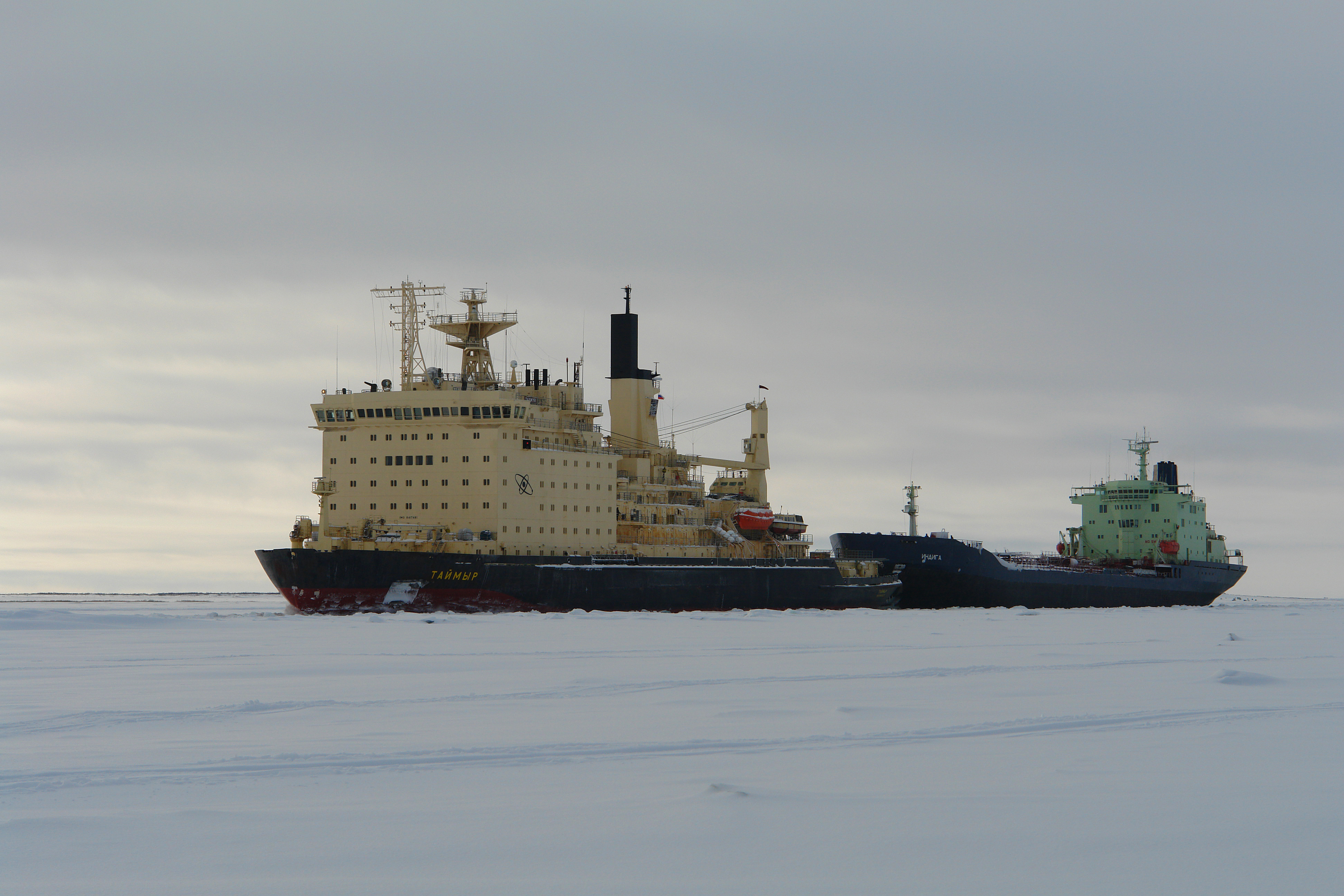
- Indiga being escorted by nuclear-powered icebreaker Taymyr near the port of Dudinka.

History
- Name: 1976–2003: Lunni; 2003–2021: Indiga (Индига)
- Owner: 1976–1995: Neste Oyj; 1995–2003: Laivanisännöintiyhtiö Lunni; 2003–2021: Murmansk Shipping Company
- Operator: 1977–1994: Neste Oyj; 1994–2003: Arctic Shipping Services (Nemarc); 2003–2021: Murmansk Shipping Company
- Port of registry: 1977–2003: Naantali, Finland; 2003–2021: Murmansk, Russia
- Builder: Werft Nobiskrug GmbH, Rendsburg, Germany
- Way number: 686
- Launched: 28 September 1976
- Identification: IMO number: 7421942; Call sign: UGXP; MMSI number: 273440550
- Fate: Sold for scrap in 2021

General characteristics
- Type: Product tanker
- Tonnage: 10,290 GT; 4,937 NT; 16,168 DWT
- Displacement: 22,654 tons
- Length: 164.40 m (539.37 ft)
- Beam: 22.22 m (72.90 ft)
- Draught: 9.55 m (31.33 ft)
- Depth: 12.00 m (39.37 ft)
- Ice class: 1A Super; RMRS UL
- Installed power: 2 × Wärtsilä Vasa 12V32E (2 × 4,920 kW); 1 × Wärtsilä Vasa 12V22D-HF (1,950 kW)
- Propulsion: Diesel electric propulsion; 11.4 MW ABB Azipod unit
- Speed: 17 knots (31 km/h; 20 mph)
- Capacity: 8 cargo tanks, 16,215 m^{3} (98%)

MT Indiga (Russian: Индига) was an ice-strengthened product tanker that sailed under the Finnish flag in 1976–2003 and under the Russian flag in 2003–2021. After her modernization in 1994 she became the second merchant ship, after her sister ship Varzuga, to be equipped with an electric azimuth thruster called Azipod.

== History ==
Lunni, built in 1976 by Werft Nobiskrug GmbH in Rendsburg, Germany, was the first ship of a series of four arctic product tankers ordered by a Finnish oil and petroleum products company Neste Oyj in the 1970s. The ships were given names after Finnish seabirds and the silhouettes of their namesake birds were painted on the side of the ships' superstructure. Lunni (Atlantic puffin) and Sotka (Aythya) were delivered in 1976 and Tiira (tern) and Uikku (grebe) in the following year. Until the 1990s the ships were used mainly to transport oil products in the Baltic Sea.

In 1993 Lunni made three consecutive voyages from Arkhangelsk to the Yana River in Siberia along the Northern Sea Route. The tanker was assisted by nuclear-powered icebreakers in the Vilkitsky Strait, but was under constant escort by Russian icebreakers only from Dikson Island to the Khatanga River.

In 1994, a year after her sister Uikku, Lunni was also chartered to Arctic Shipping Services to ship petroleum products in the Arctic Ocean. After Uikku 's successful refit her propulsion machinery was also modernized for navigation in the harsh ice conditions of the Arctic Ocean in 1994. Her ice-strengthening was later increased as well. In the following years Lunni operated in the Baltic Sea in winter and in the Northern Sea Route during summer months.

Fortum sold Lunni, mainly due to her age exceeding 25 years, to Murmansk Shipping Company in 2003. She was renamed Indiga (Индига) after the Indiga River. As Fortum is a state-owned company, the selling of two oil tankers capable of navigating in severe ice conditions resulted in a written question to the Parliament of Finland by Representative Pentti Tiusanen about whether the ships should be retained in Finnish control as they could be used to lighten a grounded oil tanker in harsh winter conditions.

The ship has since been used for oil transportation in the Arctic Ocean. Along with her sister ship Varzuga (ex-Uikku), sold to Russians at the same time, she has been involved in transporting oil from an oil terminal in the Ob Bay of the Kara Sea through the Kara Gates, the strait between Vaygach and Novaya Zemlya, to FSO Belokamenka in the Kola Bay of the Barents Sea.

Indiga was sold for scrap in 2021.

=== Incidents ===
On March 16, 2009, Indiga collided with the Russian nuclear-powered icebreaker Yamal in Yenisei Gulf in the Kara Sea. The tanker, carrying only ballast at the time, sustained a 9.5-meter crack on the main deck. No damage was reported to the Yamal.

On 19 July 2010 Indiga collided again, this time with her sister ship Varzuga, while being assisted by two nuclear icebreakers in difficult ice conditions. The bow of Varzuga and the stern of Indiga were damaged, but neither vessel lost seaworthiness and there were no spills.

== Design ==
Lunni and her sister ships were designed to be able to navigate in the ice conditions of the Baltic Sea independently without icebreaker assistance and maintain a moderately high speed in ice. For this purpose they had more power than an average Baltic tanker and were normally required to use only 50-75% of the full engine power in ice — in normal operation only one of the two main engines was coupled to shaft, with the other remaining in reserve for difficult ice conditions. The highly raked stem, similar to those in traditional icebreakers, was designed to break the ice by bending it downwards under the ship's weight. The ships were also equipped with an air bubbling system to reduce friction between the hull and ice. To prevent pollution in case of grounding the ships were also built with double hulls and conformed to the IMCO regulations in respect of segregated ballast tanks even though they were regarded only recommendations back then.

=== Modernization ===
A year after Uikku 's successful refit Lunni was also extensively modernized by Kværner Masa-Yards' Helsinki New Shipyard in 1994 and became the second merchant ship to receive a newly developed electronic azimuth thruster, Azipod. Her original MaK 12M551AK main engines (2 × 5737 kW), reduction gearbox, shaft generators, controllable-pitch propeller and rudder were removed and replaced with Wärtsilä Vasa marine generating sets and an 11.4 MW electric propulsion unit. Being one of the early designs the Azipod unit in Lunni was of the so-called "pushing" type with an aft-facing propeller instead of the more efficient "pulling" set-up usually used in modern Azipod-equipped ships.

As with Uikku, upgrading the propulsion machinery dramatically improved Lunni 's manoeuvering and icebreaking capabilities, especially when running astern. Even though the ship's stern wasn't originally designed or shaped for icebreaking, ice resistance astern in level ice was only 40% of that of when running ahead despite the icebreaking bow. The modernization of Lunni and Uikku also further proved the feasibility of Azipod in icebreaking ships and the double acting tanker (DAT) concept as navigation in the severe ice conditions in the Northern Sea Route sometimes required the ship to be turned around and run astern to break through ice. The refit also increased her speed from 14.5 to 17 knots despite the propulsion power remaining roughly the same.
