= MS Nieuw Statendam =

Cruise ship operated by Holland America Line

Nieuw Statendam
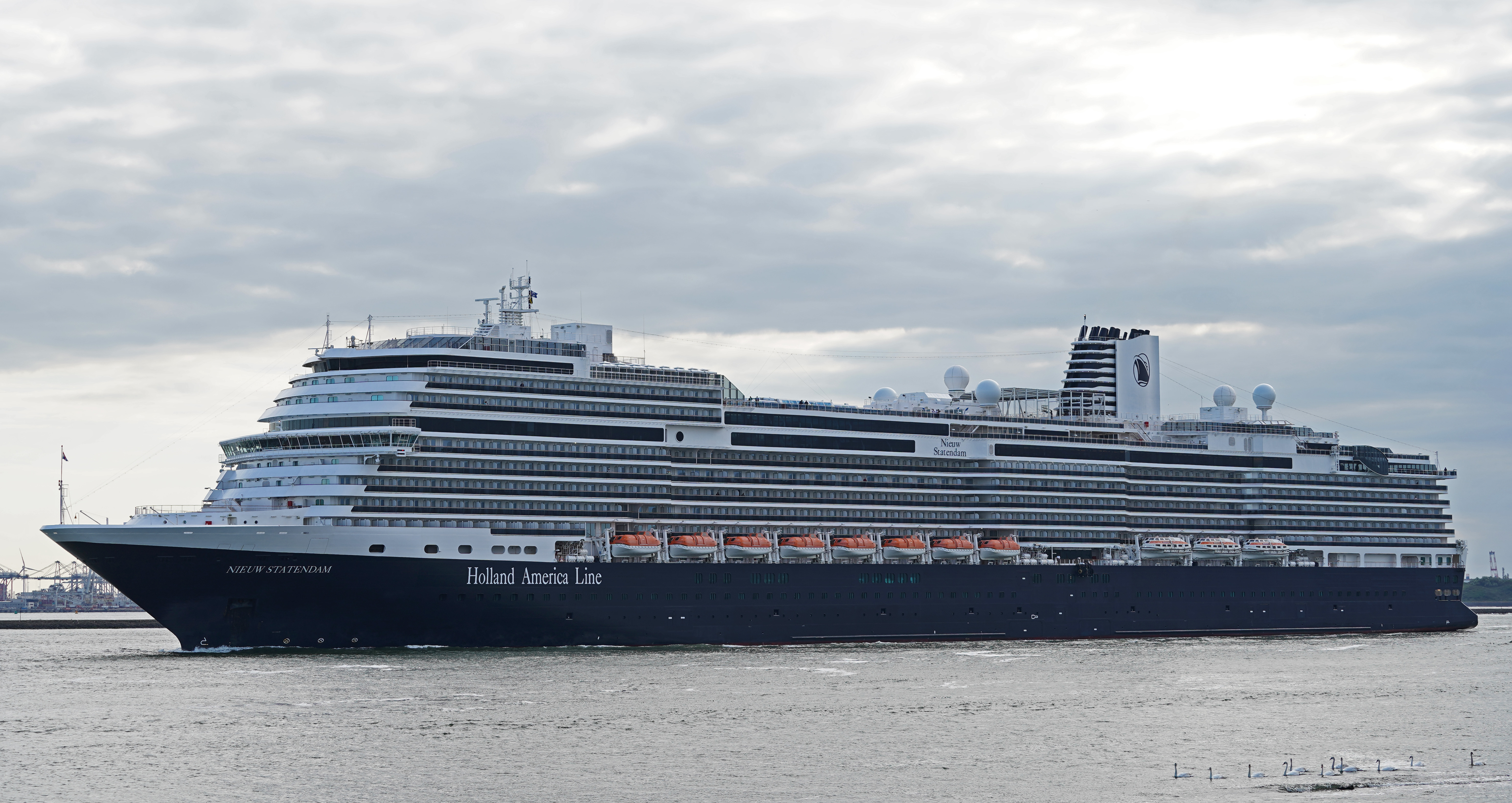
- Nieuw Statendam near Hook of Holland, May 2020

History

Netherlands
- Name: Nieuw Statendam
- Owner: Carnival Corporation & plc
- Operator: Holland America Line
- Port of registry: Rotterdam, Netherlands
- Ordered: 19 December 2014
- Builder: Fincantieri (Marghera, Italy)
- Yard number: 6244
- Laid down: 20 March 2017
- Launched: 6 December 2017
- Sponsored by: Oprah Winfrey
- Christened: 2 February 2019
- Completed: November 2018
- Acquired: 29 November 2018
- In service: 5 December 2018—present
- Identification: IMO number: 9767106; MMSI number: 247390100; Callsign: PBCO
- Status: In service

General characteristics
- Class & type: Pinnacle-class cruise ship
- Tonnage: 99,902 GT
- Length: 299.75 m (983 ft 5 in)
- Beam: 35 m (114 ft 10 in)
- Draught: 8 m (26 ft)
- Decks: 12 passenger decks
- Installed power: 4 × MaK 12V43C diesel generators producing 12,600 kW (16,900 hp) each
- Propulsion: 2 × 14,000 kW (19,000 hp) ABB Azipod units
- Speed: Service speed: 18 knots (33 km/h; 21 mph); Maximum: 22 knots (41 km/h; 25 mph)
- Capacity: 2,666 normal capacity; 4,173 max passengers
- Crew: 1,053

MS Nieuw Statendam is a Pinnacle-class cruise ship operated by Holland America Line (HAL), a division of Carnival Corporation & plc. Her name, Nieuw Statendam, alludes to the five previous ships in HAL's fleet named Statendam. She is the second of three Pinnacle-class ships built by Italian shipbuilder Fincantieri after Koningsdam (2016) and before Rotterdam (2021). Two years after the first steel was cut in July 2016 to commence construction, she was delivered to HAL in November 2018 and began operating the following month.

== Design ==
Nieuw Statendam has 12 passenger decks, a length of 299.75 metres (983 ft 5 in), a draft of 8 metres (26 ft 3 in), and a beam of 35 metres (114 ft 10 in). She is powered by a diesel-electric genset system, with four MaK engines, each producing 12.6 MW (16,900 hp) to produce a total output of 50.4 megawatts (67,600 hp). Main propulsion is via two ABB Azipods, each driven by a 14 megawatts (19,000 hp) electric motor. The system gives the vessel a service speed of 18 knots (33 km/h; 21 mph) and a maximum speed of 22 knots (41 km/h; 25 mph). On two of the four engines, open loop exhaust gas cleaning systems are installed. The ship also carries 14 lifeboats and six tender boats built by Hatecke, each with a capacity of 150 passengers. All infrastructure and IT systems were provided by Lufthansa Systems.

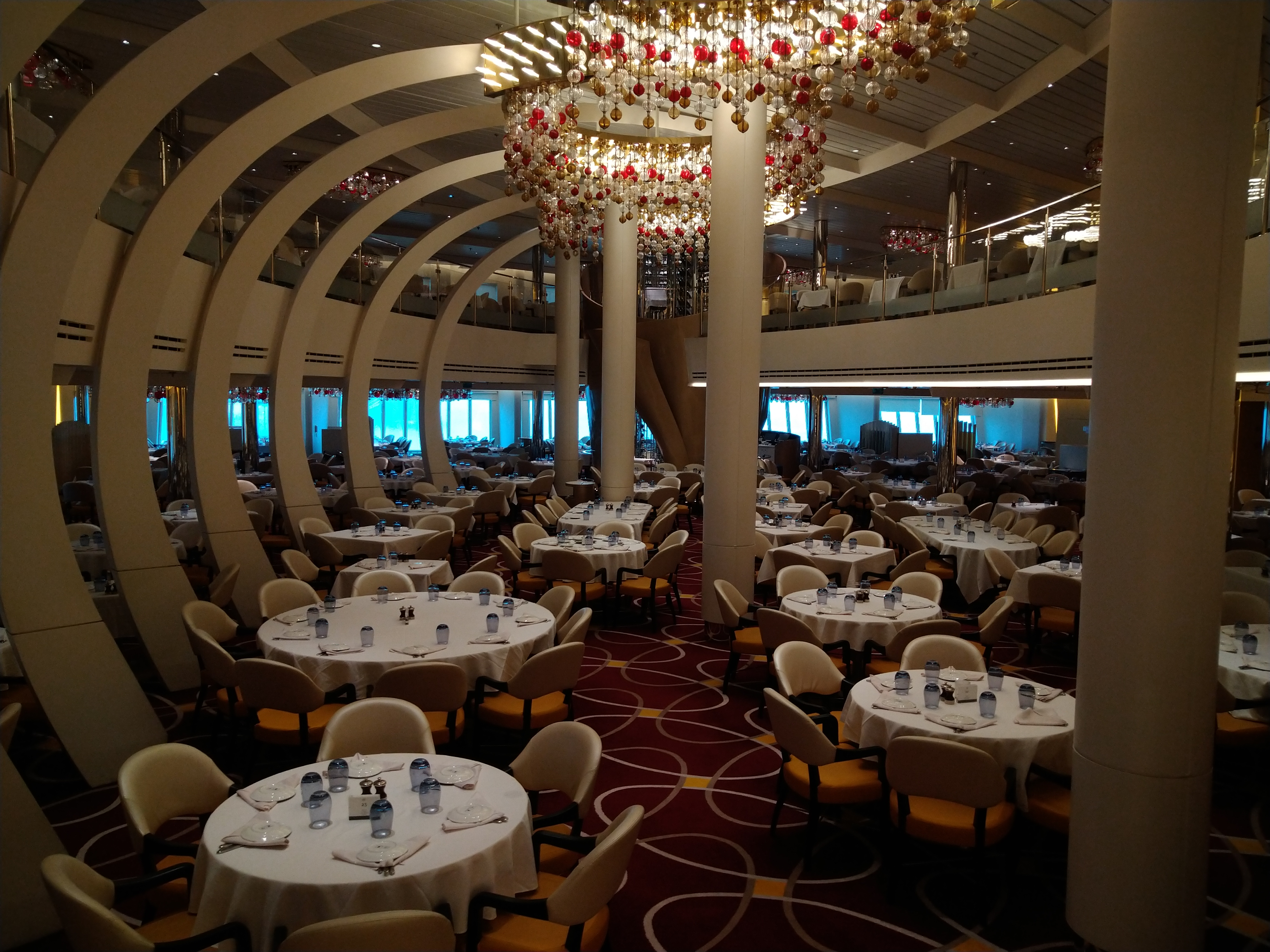
Main Dining Room

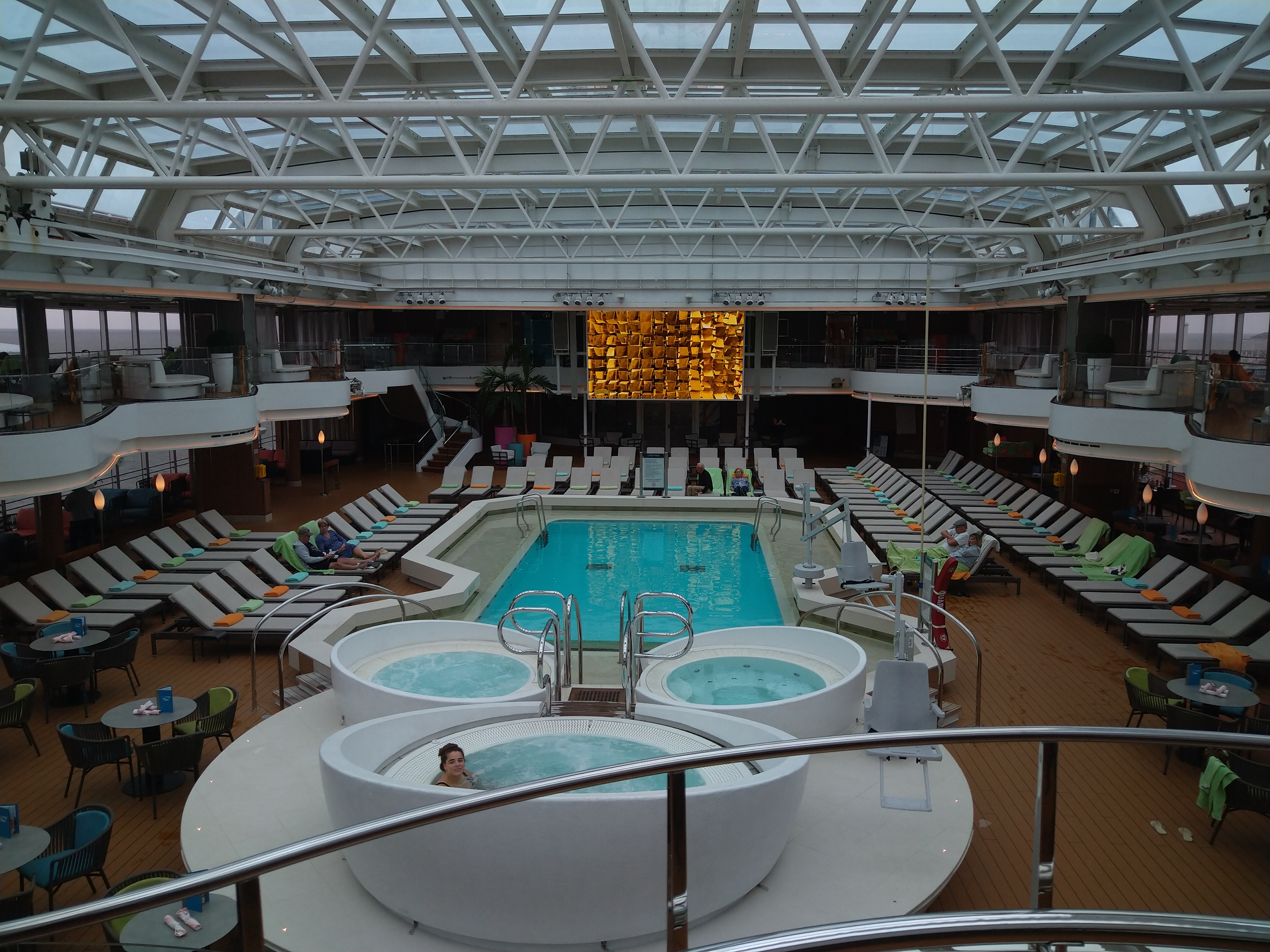
Lido Deck

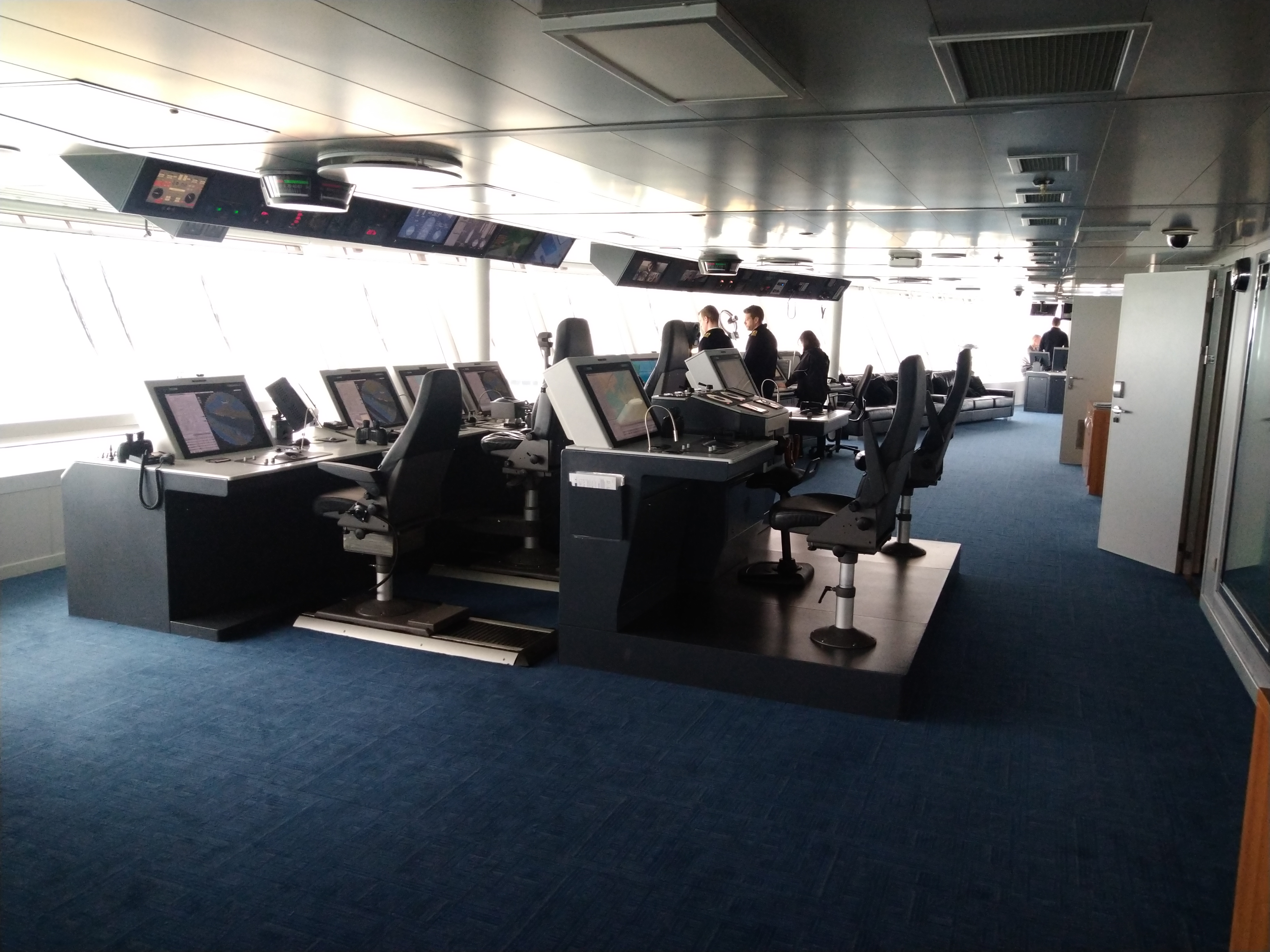
The bridge

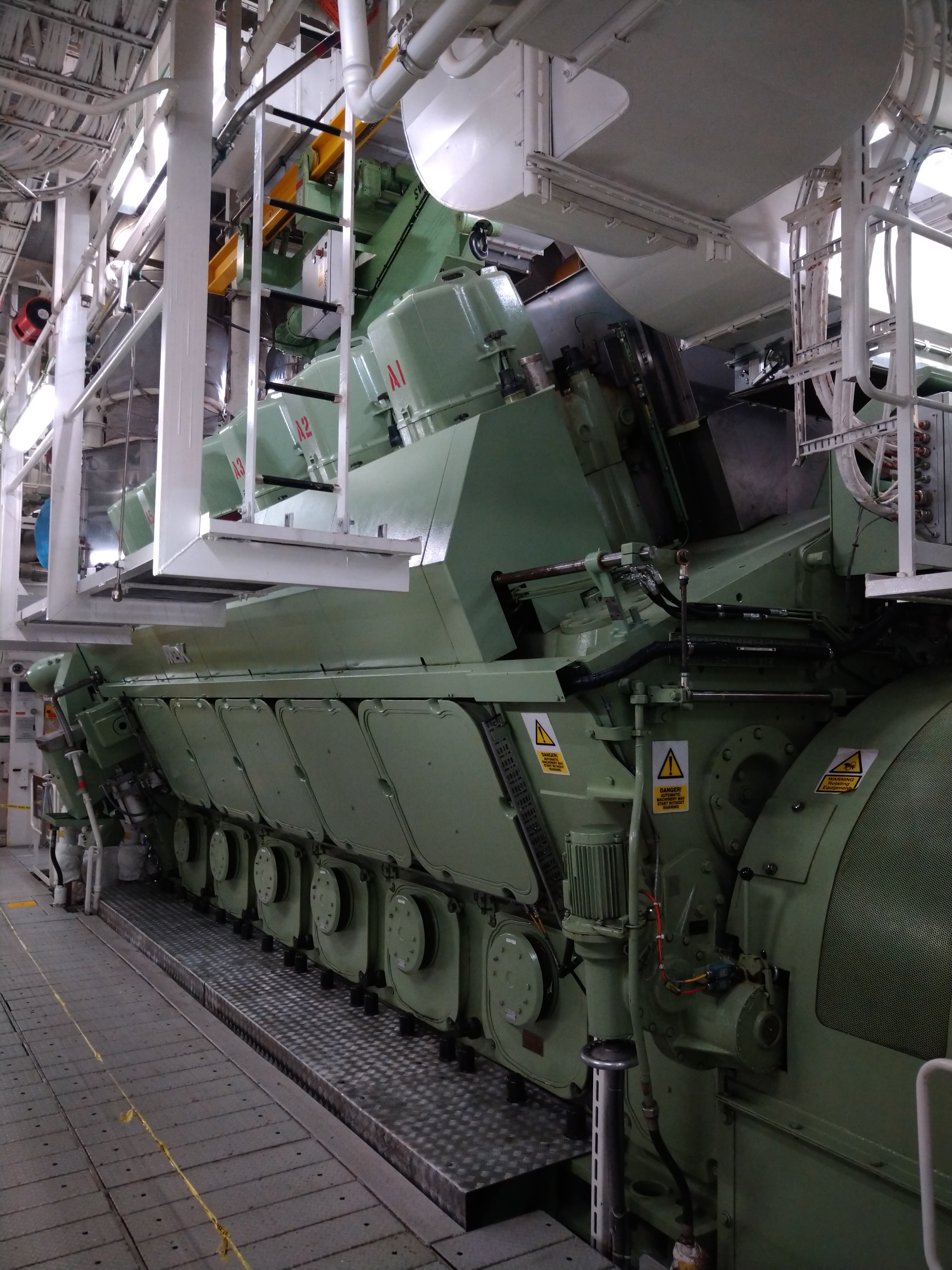
One of the four MaK V12 engines

== Construction ==
On 19 December 2014, Carnival Corporation announced it had ordered two new ships for their brands, with one being the second Pinnacle-class ship for HAL. The ship would be designed as the sister ship to MS Koningsdam, with similar dimensions and similar features that were introduced on Koningsdam. On 20 May 2016, the day Koningsdam was christened, HAL announced that the second Pinnacle-class ship would be named Nieuw Statendam, in honor of the name's history within the company.

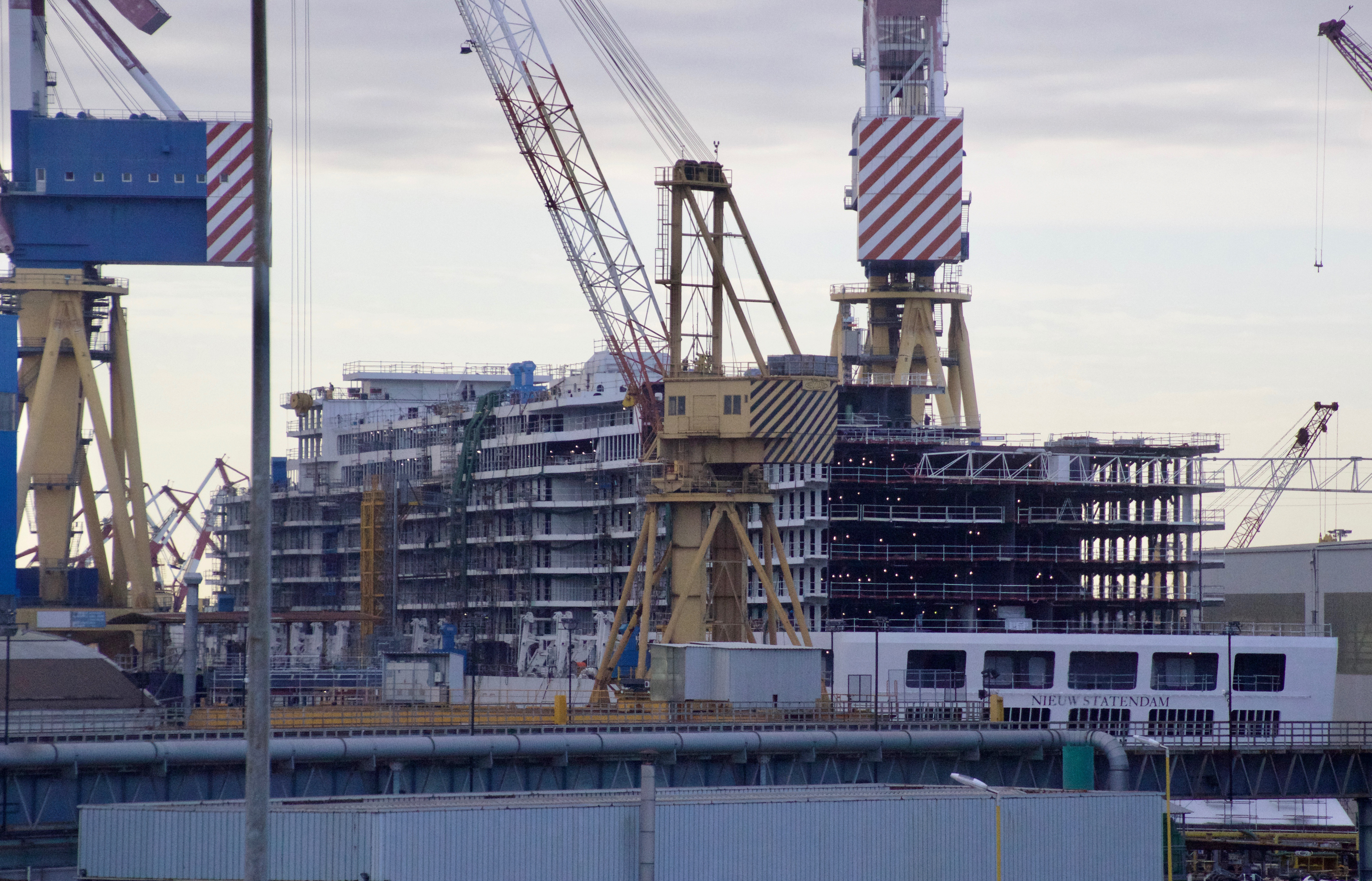
Nieuw Statendam under construction in Marghera, September 2017

On 12 July 2016, HAL celebrated the steel cutting of Nieuw Statendam, marking the beginning of her construction. The ceremony was performed in Fincantieri's Palermo shipyard, but the block being built there was subsequently re-located to the Marghera shipyard, where the rest of the ship would be constructed. On 20 March 2017, the keel was laid for Nieuw Statendam in Marghera. The first block of the ship to be built, it measured 11.3 m (37 ft) long, 34.8 m (114 ft) wide, and weighed approximately 260 t (570,000 lb).

On 6 December 2017, the coin ceremony was performed. Anne Marie Bartels served as the Madrina for the event, in which she welded an 1898 Dutch guilder to the ship's forward mast. The dry dock's gates were also briefly opened, allowing the hull to touch water for the first time. Shortly after, on 21 December 2017, the ship was floated out from the shipyard, where she would begin final outfitting.

Nieuw Statendam successfully completed her two sets of sea trials in August 2018. She first left Marghera on 10 August for two days before arriving at Fincantieri's Trieste shipyard to review the sea trial's data and perform hull maintenance. She left for her second set on 18 August and arrived in Marghera on 22 August for continued work prior to her delivery. On 29 November 2018, Nieuw Statendam was delivered to HAL in Marghera. She was christened by Oprah Winfrey on 2 February 2019 at Port Everglades in Fort Lauderdale, Florida, after performing a three-night sailing to Half Moon Cay hosted by Winfrey and Gayle King.

== Service history ==
Following her delivery, Nieuw Statendam sailed from Marghera to Rome, with a visit to Venice, to perform her inaugural voyage on 5 December 2018, a transatlantic crossing from Rome to Fort Lauderdale. The voyage called in Cartagena, Málaga, and Funchal. Nieuw Statendam sails Caribbean itineraries from Fort Lauderdale during the winter and re-positions in the spring to Europe to cruise from Amsterdam to Northern Europe and from Rome around the Mediterranean in the summer.

== Media appearances ==
The ship is featured prominently in the 2025 documentary series Supercruising: Life at Sea, which follows Nieuw Statendam and her sister ship Rotterdam on three voyages to destinations including the Caribbean, Panama Canal, and North Africa. The series offers a behind-the-scenes view of the ship's crew, operations and guest experience as they strive to deliver a high-end cruise holiday.
