= MS Rotterdam (2020) =

Cruise ship

Rotterdam
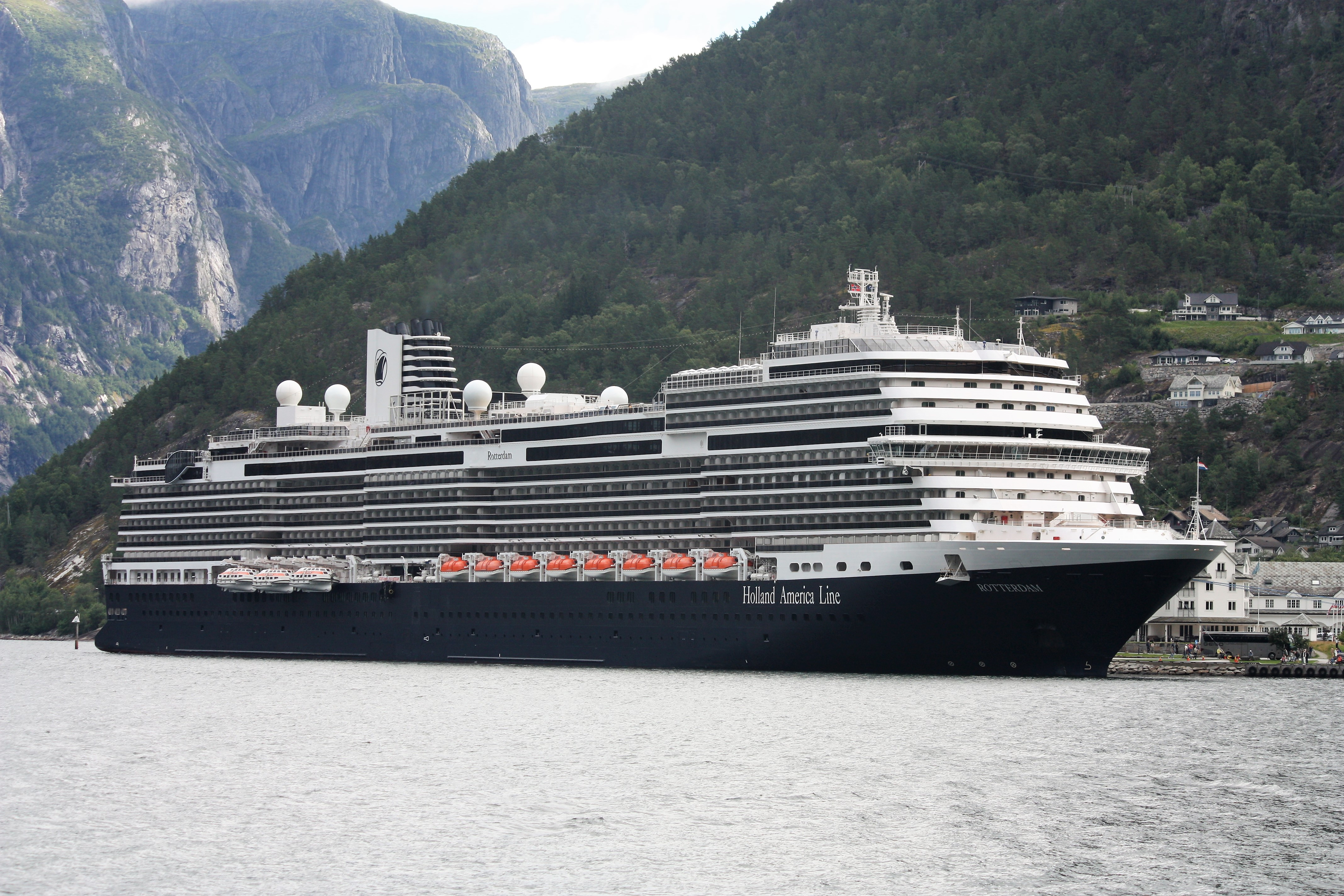
- Rotterdam near Eidfjord, 2022

History

Netherlands
- Name: Rotterdam
- Owner: Carnival Corporation & plc
- Operator: Holland America Line
- Port of registry: Rotterdam, Netherlands
- Ordered: 19 January 2017
- Builder: Fincantieri; Marghera, Italy
- Yard number: 6278
- Laid down: 21 November 2019
- Launched: 5 October 2020
- Sponsored by: Princess Margriet of the Netherlands
- Christened: 30 May 2022
- Acquired: 30 July 2021
- Maiden voyage: 20 October 2021
- In service: 2021–present
- Identification: IMO number: 9837470; MMSI number: 245464000; Callsign: PDGW
- Status: In service

General characteristics
- Class & type: Pinnacle-class cruise ship
- Tonnage: 99,935 GT
- Length: 299.79 m (983 ft 7 in)
- Beam: 35 m (114 ft 10 in)
- Draught: 8 m (26 ft 3 in)
- Decks: 12 passenger decks
- Installed power: 4 × MaK 12VM43C diesel generators producing 12,600 kW (16,900 hp) each
- Propulsion: 2 × 14,000 kW (19,000 hp) ABB Azipod units
- Speed: Service speed: 18 knots (33 km/h; 21 mph); Maximum: 22.2 knots (41.1 km/h; 25.5 mph)
- Capacity: 2,668 normal capacity; 4,173 max passengers
- Crew: 1,053

MS Rotterdam is a Pinnacle-class cruise ship operated by Holland America Line (HAL), a subsidiary of Carnival Corporation. Originally named Ryndam in development, she was renamed Rotterdam in July 2020 during construction to honor the name's legacy in the cruise line's history after six previous vessels in HAL's fleet bore the name. Rotterdam is the third of HAL's Pinnacle class in the fleet built by Italian shipbuilder Fincantieri and follows older sister ships Koningsdam (2016) and Nieuw Statendam (2018). Two years after the first steel was cut in March 2019 to commence construction, she was delivered in July 2021 and began operating in October 2021.

== Design ==
Rotterdam has 12 passenger decks and measures 99,935 gross tonnage (GT). She has a length of 299.79 meters (983 ft 7 in), a draft of 8 meters (26 ft), and a beam of 35 meters (115 ft). She is powered by a diesel-electric genset system, with four total MaK engines, producing a total output of 50.4 megawatts (67,600 hp). Main propulsion is provided via two propellers, each driven by 14-megawatt (19,000 hp) ABB Azipod units. The system gives the vessel a service speed of 18 knots (33 km/h; 21 mph) and a maximum speed of 22 knots (41 km/h; 25 mph). The ship houses 1,340 passenger cabins and 591 crew cabins. Of the 1,340 passenger cabins, 68% have a balcony. The ship has a maximum capacity of 4,173 passengers and crew.

The interior of Rotterdam was designed by Adam Tihany's design firm, Tihany Design, along with Yran & Storbraaten. The ship was crafted in-line with the musical theming seen on her sister ships, Koningsdam and Nieuw Statendam. Live music is the focus of the entertainment offered onboard and is centered around a section of the ship HAL dubs the "Music Walk". The performance venues onboard include a stage, a piano bar designed in partnership with Billboard, and a rock music hall named after the Rolling Stone magazine for live rock.

== Construction ==
On 19 January 2017, Carnival Corporation announced that it had signed a memorandum with Fincantieri for HAL's third Pinnacle-class vessel. The ship was planned to be designed in line with the features and dimensions offered on her sister ships, Koningsdam and Nieuw Statendam, at 99,500 GT and with a guest capacity of approximately 2,660 passengers.

Construction for the then-unnamed ship inaugurated with the steel-cutting on 13 March 2019 at Fincantieri's shipyard in Marghera. On 7 April 2019, HAL announced the third Pinnacle-class ship would bear the name Ryndam in honor of the name's history with the cruise line. On 3 October 2019, HAL marked a milestone in the construction of Ryndam, when the first hull block was floated out to sea from Fincantieri's shipyard in Palermo. She had her keel laid on 21 November 2019 in Marghera, where the rest of the ship's hull blocks would be assembled.

On 30 July 2020, HAL announced that Ryndam would be renamed Rotterdam in honor of the 1997-built Rotterdam, which had been sold earlier that year, and the name's legacy within the company's history. A coin ceremony was performed on 2 October 2020 ahead of the ship's float-out in Marghera on 5 October, marking the end of the ship's exterior construction and the beginning of the interior's outfitting. On 25 April 2021, Rotterdam began her sea trials after sailing out from Marghera for the first time. The process took 11 days, including a trip to Fincantieri's dry dock in Trieste for hull maintenance and painting, as well as five days sailing on the Adriatic Sea, before the ship returned to Marghera on 6 May after successfully undergoing the trials.

On 29 July 2021, Fincantieri held its handover ceremony in Marghera to deliver Rotterdam to HAL the following day. The delivery came two months later than planned after the cruise line first announced in July 2020 that the COVID-19 pandemic had forced construction delays that extended the project's timeline. In October 2021, HAL named Princess Margriet of the Netherlands as the ship's godmother for the christening ceremony in Rotterdam. By naming the ship, she would become a five-time godmother for HAL after most recently christening Oosterdam in 2003. Princess Margriet christened the vessel on 30 May 2022.

== Service history ==
Rotterdam was originally scheduled to set sail for her maiden voyage, from Trieste to Civitavecchia, on 21 May 2021, calling in Dubrovnik, Kotor, Corfu, Taormina, and Naples. However, after the ship's delivery was postponed, HAL pushed the date back to 1 August 2021, after which she would re-position to Amsterdam for her inaugural season homeport and cruise to Northern Europe, including Norway, Iceland, and the Baltic region. In June 2021, HAL postponed the first voyage date once more to 26 September 2021 before it eventually cancelled all of her European sailings for her inaugural season upon the ship's delivery the following month. She sailed her first voyage on 20 October 2021, a 14-day transatlantic crossing between Amsterdam and her maiden homeport of Port Everglades with planned stops at Zeebrugge, Le Havre, Portland, Brest, and Ponta Delgada. For her inaugural season, Rotterdam sailed in the Caribbean before returning to Europe in April 2022.

On 15 October 2022, Rotterdam recreated the cruise line's maiden itinerary to celebrate Holland America Line's 150th anniversary: SS Rotterdam departed Rotterdam for the first time on 15 October 1872. Manhattan Borough President, Mark Levine officially declared 26 October an "honorary day" for the cruise line, recognising the occasion.

== Media appearances ==
The ship is featured prominently in the 2025 documentary series Supercruising: Life at Sea, which follows Rotterdam and her sister ship Nieuw Statendam on three voyages to destinations including the Caribbean, Panama Canal, and North Africa. The series offers a behind-the-scenes view of the ship's crew, operations and guest experience as they strive to deliver a high-end cruise holiday.
