= Serga (Murmansk Oblast) =

- Native name: Серга (Russian)

Location
- Country: Russia
- Region: Murmansk Oblast

Physical characteristics
- Source: Lake Sergozero
- Mouth: Varzuga
  - coordinates: 66.4505°N 36.4362°E
- Length: 38 km (24 mi)

Basin features
- Progression: Varzuga→ White Sea

The Serga (Russian: Серга) is a river in the south of the Kola Peninsula in Murmansk Oblast, Russia. It is 38 kilometres (24 mi) long, and has a drainage basin of 844 square kilometres (326 sq mi). The Serga originates from the Lake Sergozero and flows into the Varzuga.
