= Pentti Tiusanen =

Finnish politician (1949–2018)

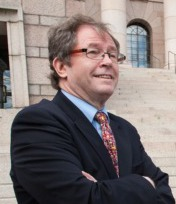
Pentti Tiusanen

Pentti Uolevi Tiusanen (6 March 1949, Kotka – 8 December 2018) was a Finnish politician and member of Finnish Parliament, representing the Left Alliance. He was elected to Finnish Parliament in the 1995 election. As his civil profession, Tiusanen was a surgeon.
