= Indiga =

- Native name: И́ндига (Russian)

Location
- Country: Russia
- District: Nenets Autonomous District

Physical characteristics
- Source
  - location: Northeast edge of the Timan Ridge
  - coordinates: 67°08′56″N 49°32′33″E
- Mouth
  - location: Indigskaya Bay, Barents Sea
  - coordinates: 67°41′30″N 48°43′47″E
  - elevation: 0 m (0 ft)
- Length: 193 km (120 mi)
- Basin size: 3,790 km^{2} (1,460 sq mi)

Basin features
- River system: Indiga
- GKZ: RU/03040000112103000055247

The Indiga (Russian: Индига) is a river in the Nenets Autonomous District in the north of the European part of Russia. It flows into the Barents Sea.

The Indiga rises on the northeast edge of the Timan Ridge. It flows in a north-northwesterly direction through the Malozemelskaya Tundra before flowing into Indigskaya Bay, a small bay east of Chosha Bay on the coast of the Barents Sea. At its mouth on the right bank is the settlement Indiga.

The Indiga has a length of 193 km and a watershed of 3790 km². On the upper reaches of the river has rapids. In the lower reaches of the Indiga runs in a wide river valley. The Indiga is mainly fed by the melting snow. In late October or early November, the Indiga becomes icebound and remains covered with ice until May.
