= Belokamenka (ship) =

Coordinates: 69°04′16″N 33°09′44″E

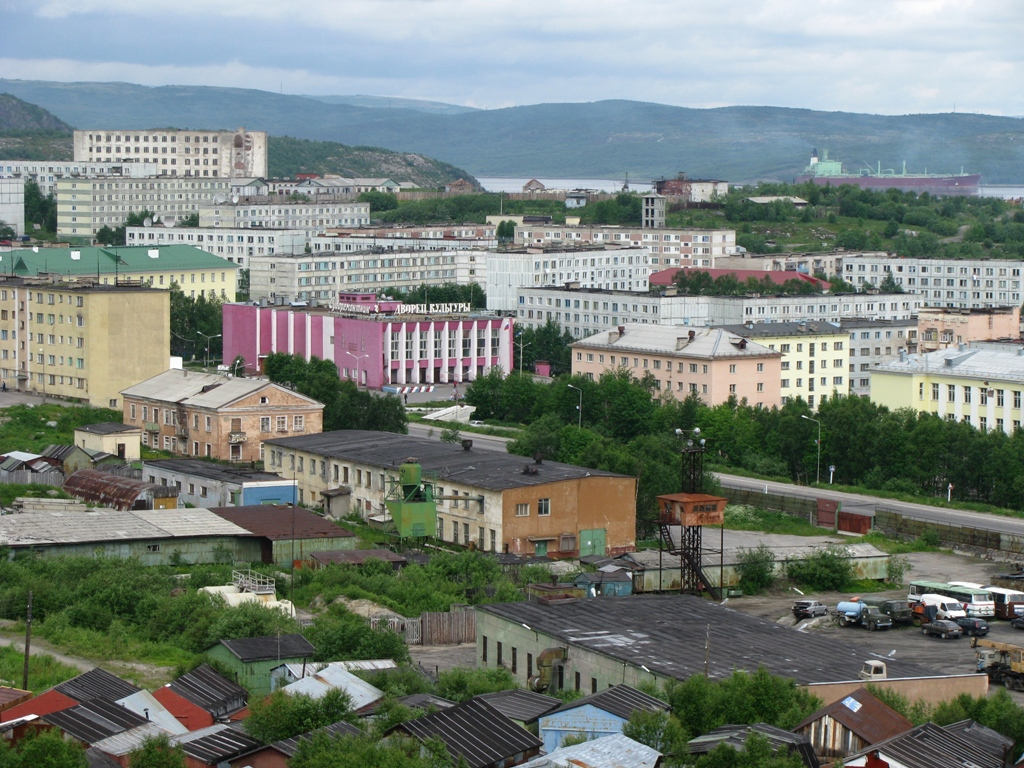
- Belokamenka in Roslyakovo (top right corner)

History
- Name: Belokamenka (2004–...); Berge Pioneer (1980–2004)
- Owner: Oil Terminal "Belokamenka" L.L.C.(2004–...); Bella Store (2004–2006); BW Gas (1980–2004)
- Operator: Rosnefteflot
- Port of registry: Murmansk, Russia
- Builder: Mitsui Eng. & Shipbuilding Co., Ltd., Chiba Works
- Laid down: 1978
- Launched: 1980
- Completed: 1980; 2004 (converted)
- Acquired: 1980
- In service: 1980
- Out of service: 2019
- Identification: DNV ID: 11713; IMO number: 7708314
- Fate: Scrapped 2019

General characteristics
- Class & type: DNV: 1A1 Ship-shaped Oil Storage Unit E0
- Type: Floating Storage and Offloading
- Tonnage: 360,700 DWT; 188,728 GT; 125,883 NT
- Length: 340.5 m (1,117 ft)
- Beam: 65.05 m (213.4 ft)
- Draught: 23.233 m (76.22 ft)

Belokamenka was an oil tanker (a very large crude carrier, a VLCC). It was latterly used as an FSO (floating production storage and offloading) vessel moored off in Kola Bay near Murmansk and after 2015 off Singapore. Belokamenka was scrapped in April 2019.

== History ==
Belokamenka was originally built by Mitsui Eng. & Shipbuilding Co., Ltd., Chiba Works, on 1980. Its name was Berge Pioneer until 2004.

== Technical features ==
Belokamenka has a length of 340 metres (1,120 ft) and width of 65 metres (213 ft). It handled four million tonnes of crude oil per year, shipped in by small shuttle tankers from Arkhangelsk.

== Operator ==
Belokamenka was chartered by Rosnefteflot, a subsidiary of Rosneft, on a long-term basis. It was operated by the Oil Terminal "Belokamenka" L.L.C.
