= Automated tank cleaning machine =

Storage cleaning machine

An automated tank cleaning machine is a machine used to clean cargo, process, underground storage tanks and similar equipment such as those found in tank trucks, railroad cars, barges, oil tankers, food and beverage manufacturing facilities, chemical processing plants, ethanol plants, and brewing facilities. Various generic terms are used to refer to automatic tank cleaning machines regardless of manufacturer.

== Operation ==
Tanks must be cleaned from time to time for various reasons. One reason is to change the type of product carried inside a tank to prevent cross contamination. Another is to allow the tank to be inspected or for maintenance to be performed within a tank and to prevent product build-up on tank interior walls.

Automated tank cleaning machines work in a manner similar to an irrigation sprinkler but are highly engineered to deliver increased force. Water forced through rotary jet nozzles rotates the device on a dual axis, creating a 360° cleaning pattern. As the water sprays, the liquid is pumped out of the tank. Portable cleaning systems are commonly used for many outdoor applications while fixed or permanent Clean-in-Place (CIP) systems are used in more sanitary environments.

On most crude-oil tankers, a special crude oil washing system, or COW system, is part of the cleaning process. The COW system circulates hot crude oil through the fixed tank-cleaning system to remove wax and asphaltic deposits.

Although machines are often used to wash tanks, a final stage of manual cleaning known as mucking, is usually performed. Mucking requires protocols for entry into confined spaces and the use of airline respirators, protective clothing and safety observers.

Manual tank cleaning is dangerous in a number of ways. While tank barges can be cleaned in port, shipboard tanks are generally cleaned at sea. This is largely due to risks of fire and explosion inside the tanks.

== History ==
The first automated tank cleaning machine was invented by Arthur Butterworth and patented in 1920. His goal was to limit the amount of time that workers had to spend inside tanks, and partially relieve them of a dangerous and laborious job. In 1925, Butterworth established a company to market the machine. Standard Oil New Jersey bought the company in 1930, and it later became a subsidiary of the Exxon Corporation.

In 1986, as part of an internal restructuring at Exxon, the Butterworth company was sold to Exxon management. Today the company is privately held, and headquartered in Houston, Texas.

== See also ==
- Oil tanker
- Chemical tanker

== Citations ==
- Hayler, William B.; Keever, John M. (2003). American Merchant Seaman's Manual. Cornell Maritime Press. ISBN 0-87033-549-9.
- Huber, Mark (2001). Tanker operations: a handbook for the person-in-charge (PIC). Cambridge, MD: Cornell Maritime Press. ISBN 0-87033-528-6.
- International Chamber of Shipping (1996). International Safety Guide for Oil Tankers and Terminals (ISGOTT). New York: Hyperion Books. ISBN 1-85609-081-7.
- Occupational Safety & Health Administration (OSHA) (2008-01-30). "Process: Tank Cleaning". Shipbuilding and Ship Repair - Hazards and Solutions. Department of Labor. Archived from the original on 2008-04-01.
- Turpin, Edward A.; McEwen, William A. (1980). Merchant Marine Officers' Handbook (4th ed.). Centreville, MD: Cornell Maritime Press. ISBN 978-0870330568.
- Butterworth, Inc. (2001). "About Us". Butterworth Tank Cleaning Systems. Butterworth, Inc. Archived from the original on 2008-11-20.
