= Varzuga (river) =

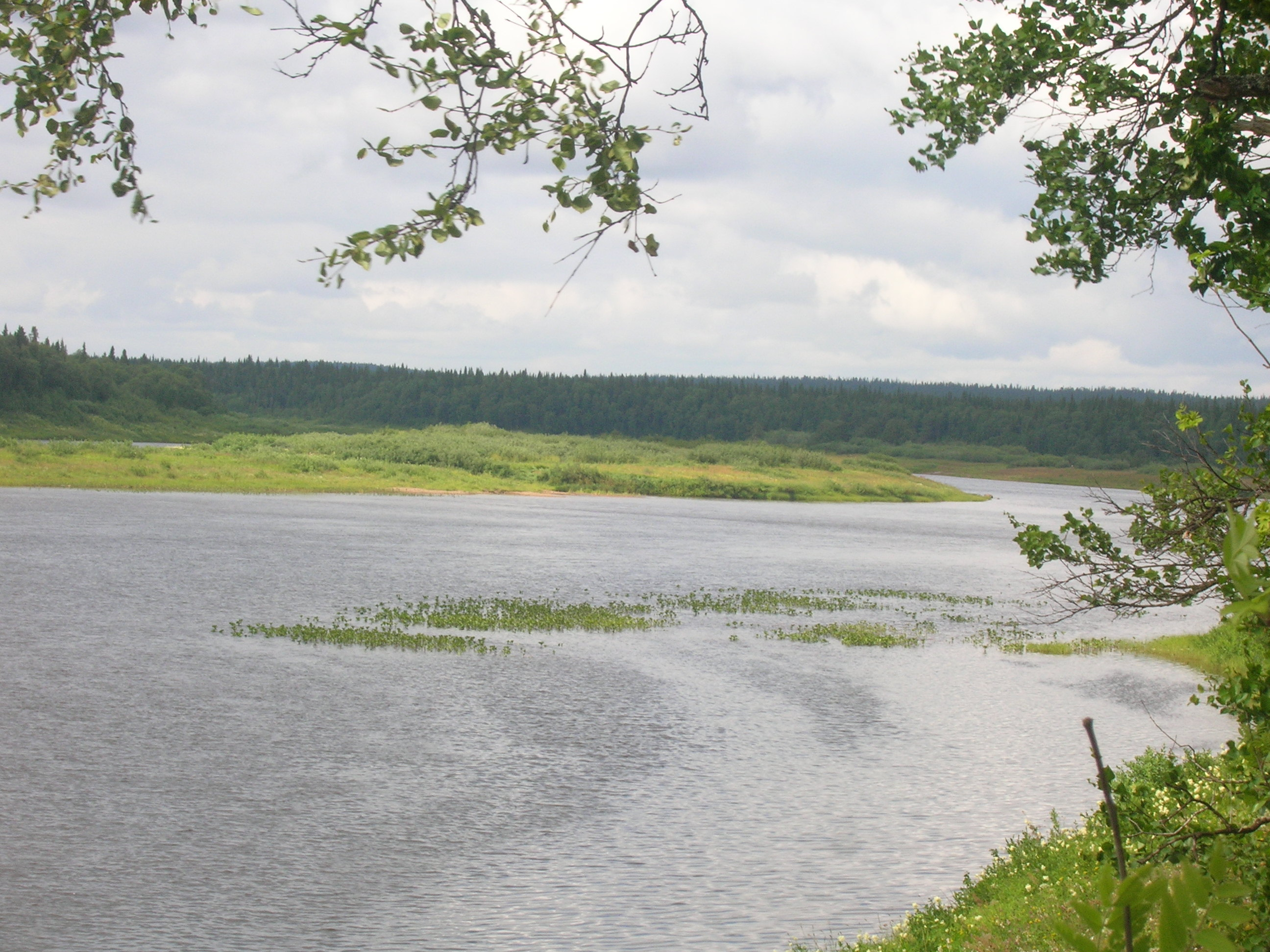

Location
- Country: Russia

Physical characteristics
- Source
  - location: Murmansk Oblast
- Mouth: White Sea
  - coordinates: 66°16′03″N 36°56′27″E
- Length: 254 km (158 mi)
- Basin size: 9,840 km^{2} (3,800 sq mi)
- Discharge
  - average: 77 m^{3}/s (2,700 cu ft/s) (average) and up to 300 m^{3}/s (11,000 cu ft/s) in May and June

Basin features
- Tributaries
  - left: Serga

The Varzuga (Russian: Ва́рзуга) is a river in the south of the Kola Peninsula in Murmansk Oblast, Russia. It is 254 km in length. The area of its basin is 9,840 km^{2}. The Varzuga flows into the White Sea. It freezes up in October and stays under the ice until May.

This is the most prolific atlantic salmon fishing river in the whole of the Kola peninsular. Over the season over 10,000 salmon are caught and returned in this river system. Favourite Salmon fishing patterns are the Kola Vulcan, Kola Blue Fire, Kola Fire and the Kolalander.
