= Summer draft =

Worst-case loaded draft a ship can have

Summer draft is a nautical term for the worst-case loaded draft a ship can have. This draft is corrected for the worst-case seasonal conditions. During summer, the water is warmer, thus expands slightly, losing density. This effect causes ships to float deeper in the water. Summer draft is the opposite of light ship condition.
