= Deadweight tonnage =

Measure of how much weight a ship can carry

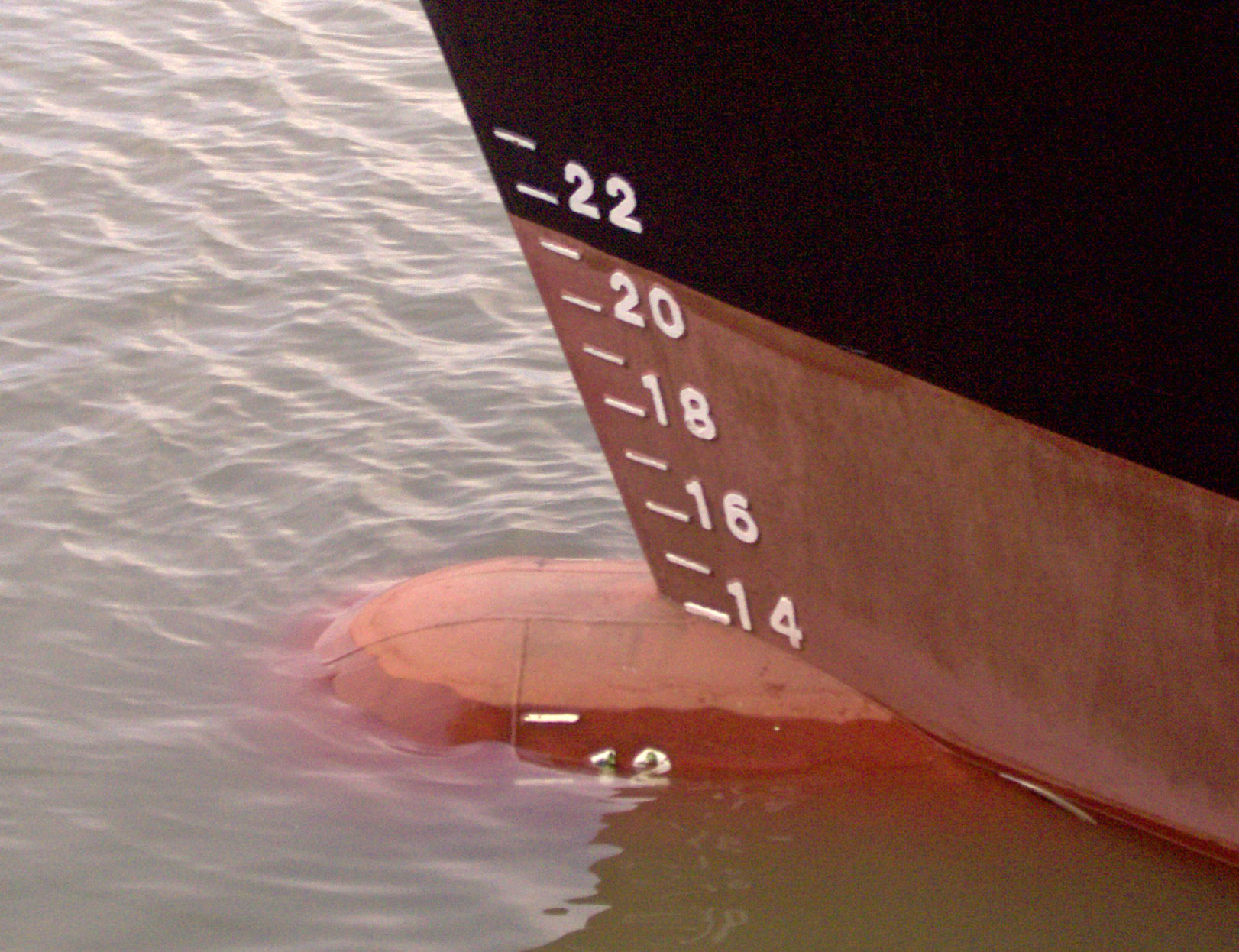
The more heavily loaded a ship is, the lower it sits in the water. Maximum DWT is the amount of weight a ship can carry without riding dangerously low in the water.

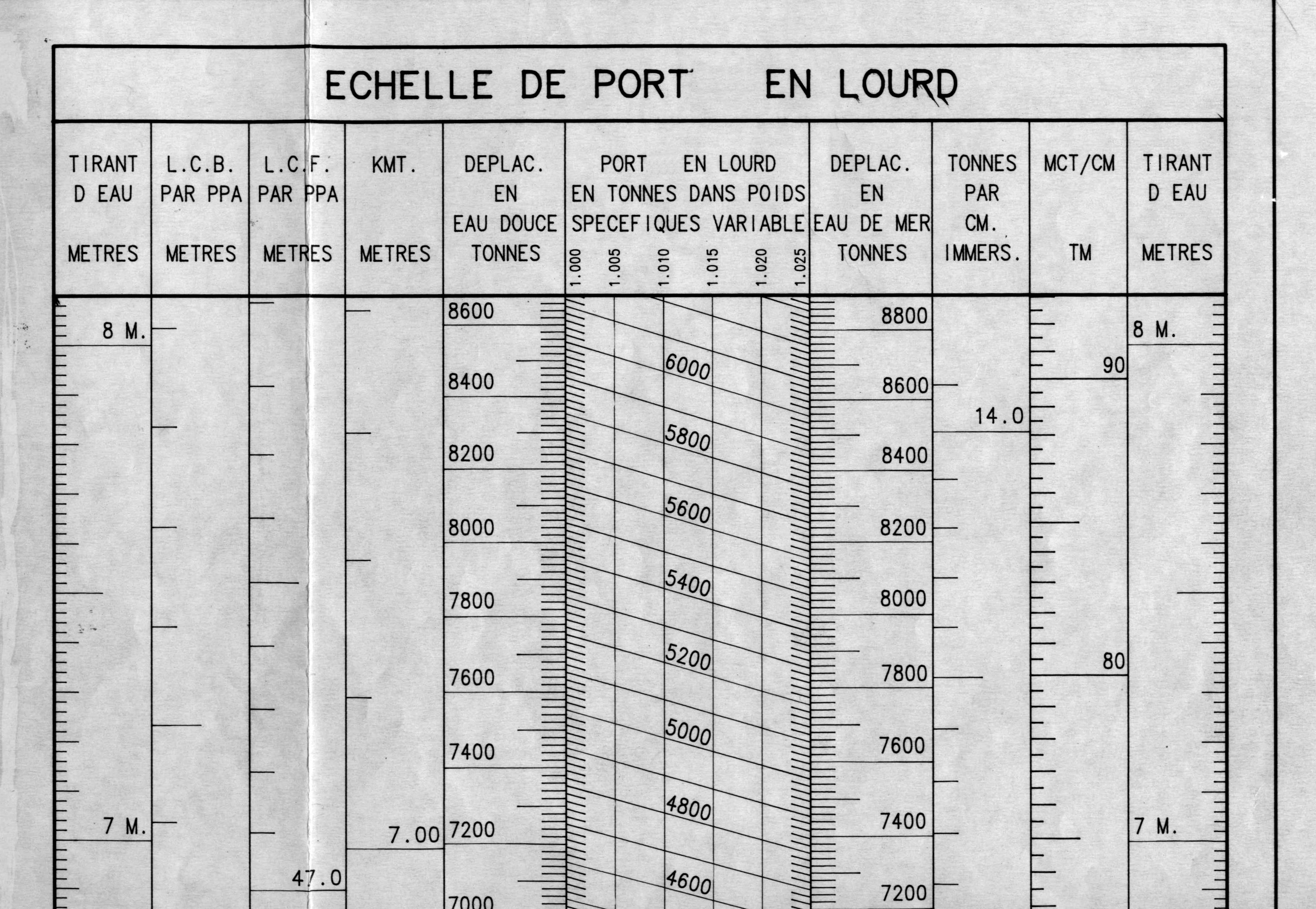
Scale for a 6,000-tonne DWT ship

Deadweight tonnage (also known as deadweight; abbreviated to DWT, D.W.T., d.w.t., or dwt) or tons deadweight (DWT) is a measure of how much weight a ship can carry. It is the sum of the weights of cargo, fuel, fresh water, ballast water, provisions, passengers, and crew.

DWT is often used to specify a ship's maximum permissible deadweight (i.e. when it is fully loaded so that its Plimsoll line is at water level), although it may also denote the actual DWT of a ship not loaded to capacity.

== Definition ==
Deadweight tonnage is a measure of a vessel's weight carrying capacity, not including the empty weight of the ship. It is distinct from the displacement (weight of water displaced), which includes the ship's own weight, or the volumetric measures of gross tonnage or net tonnage (and the legacy measures gross register tonnage and net register tonnage).

Deadweight tonnage was historically expressed in long tons, (Note: One long ton (LT) is 1,016 kilograms (2,240 lb).) but is now usually given internationally in tonnes (metric tons). In modern international shipping conventions such as the International Convention for the Safety of Life at Sea and the International Convention for the Prevention of Pollution From Ships, deadweight is explicitly defined as the difference in tonnes between the displacement of a ship in water of a specific gravity of 1.025 (corresponding to average density of sea water of 1,025 kg/m^{3} or 1,728 lb/cu yd) at the draft corresponding to the assigned summer freeboard and the light displacement (lightweight) of the ship.
