= Azipod =

Electric drive azimuth thruster

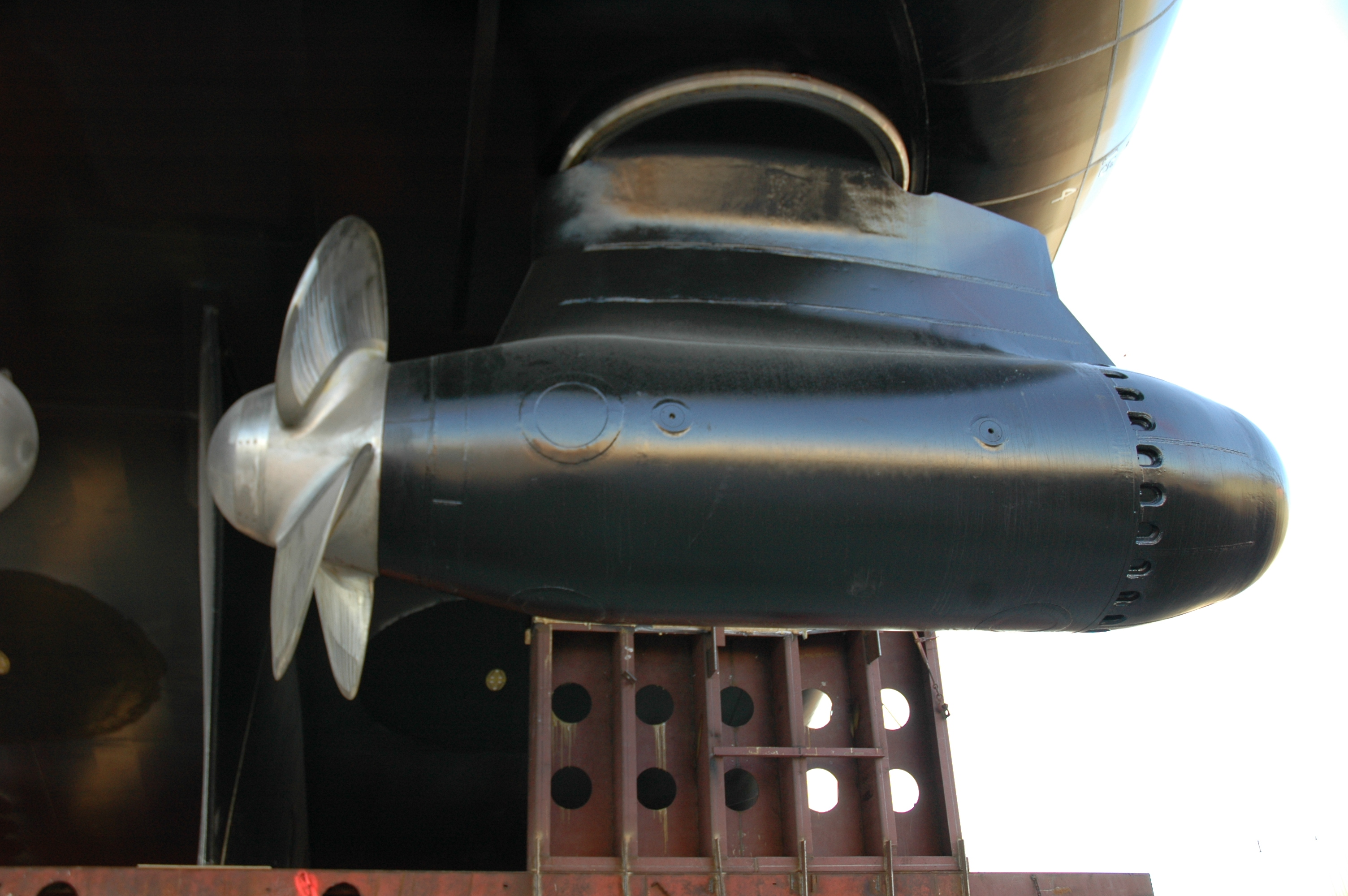
Closeup of one of USCGC Mackinaw's 3.3 MW Azipod units

Azipod is a trademarked azimuth thruster pod design, a marine propulsion unit consisting of a fixed pitch propeller mounted on a steerable gondola ("pod") containing the electric motor driving the propeller, allowing ships to be more maneuverable. They were developed in Finland in the late 1980s jointly by Wärtsilä Marine, Strömberg and the Finnish National Board of Navigation.

Although "Azipod" is a registered trademark and brand name owned by ABB, it is sometimes used as a generic term for podded propulsion units manufactured by other companies.

== Concept ==
In the conventional azimuth thrusters such as Z-drive and L-drive thrusters, the propeller is driven by an electric motor or a diesel engine inside the ship's hull. The propeller is coupled to the prime mover with shafts and bevel gears that allow rotating the propeller about a vertical axis. This type of propulsion system has a long tradition throughout the 1990s and they are produced by a number of companies around the world.

In the Azipod unit, the electric motor is mounted inside the propulsion unit and the propeller is connected directly to the motor shaft. Electric power for the propulsion motor is conducted through slip rings that let the Azipod unit rotate 360 degrees about the vertical axis. Because Azipod units utilize fixed-pitch propellers, power is always fed through a variable-frequency drive or cycloconverter that allows speed and direction control of the propulsion motors.

The pod's propeller usually faces forward because in this pulling (or tractor) configuration the propeller is more efficient due to operation in undisturbed flow. Because it can rotate around its mount axis, the pod can apply its thrust in any direction. Azimuth thrusters allow ships to be more maneuverable and enable them to travel backward nearly as efficiently as they can travel forward. In order for the full capabilities of podded propulsion units to be realized in commercial service, shiphandling training on simulators and crewed models is required for the crew.

The podded design typically achieved a 9% better fuel efficiency than the conventional propulsion system when it was first installed in the 1990s. In the meantime, improvements to the conventional designs have shrunk the gap to 6–8%, but on the other hand the hydrodynamic flow around the Azipod has been improved by fin retrofits and a dynamic computer optimization of the respective operating angles of the pods in multipod installations, thereby yielding overall efficiency improvements in the range of 18%.

== History ==
=== Development ===
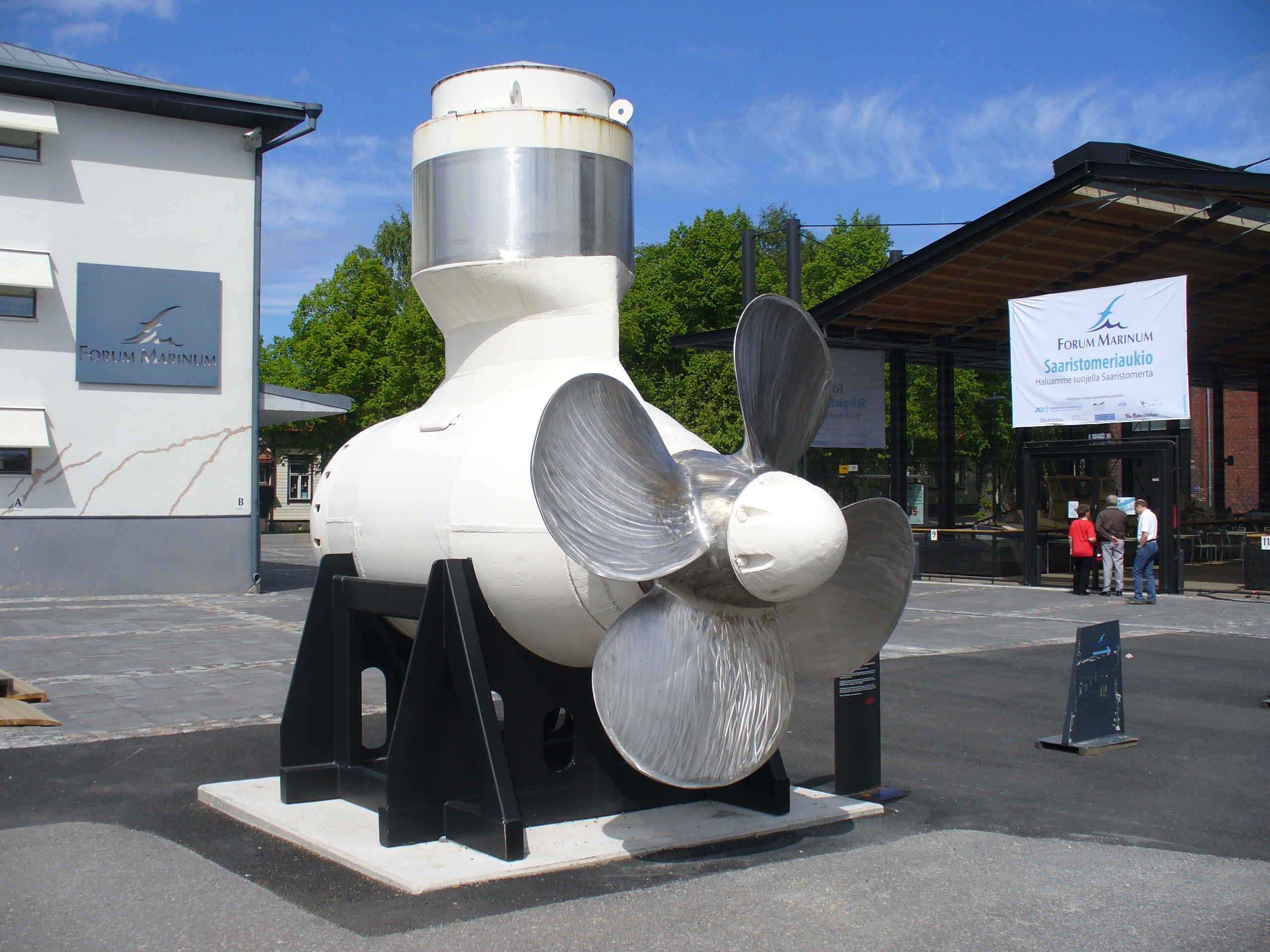
The first Azipod unit, installed on the Finnish fairway support vessel Seili in 1990, is displayed at the Forum Marinum maritime museum in Turku, Finland.

In 1987, the Finnish National Board of Navigation made a co-operation proposal to the electrical equipment company Strömberg (later ABB) and the Finnish shipbuilder Wärtsilä Marine for the development of a new type of electric propulsion unit. Prior to this, the companies had been working together for decades in the field of diesel-electric propulsion systems and in the 1980s produced the first icebreakers with alternating current propulsion motors and cycloconverters.

The development of the prototype started in 1989 and the first unit was ready for installation in the following year. The 1.5 MW unit, dubbed "Azipod" (short for azimuthing electric podded drive) was installed on the 1979-built Finnish fairway support vessel Seili at Hietalahti shipyard in Helsinki, Finland. After the refit, the vessel's icebreaking performance was considerably increased and she was also found out to be capable of breaking ice astern (backwards). This discovery of a new operating mode eventually led to the development of the double acting ship concept in the early 1990s. When Seili was refitted with new propulsion system in the 2000s, the prototype unit was donated to Forum Marinum and put on display in Turku, Finland.

Following the encouraging experiences from the prototype installation, the development of the Azipod concept continued and the next units were retrofitted on two Finnish oil tankers, Uikku and Lunni, in 1993 and 1994, respectively. Nearly eight times as powerful as the prototype, the 11.4 MW Azipod units considerably increased the icegoing ability of the vessels that were already built with independent icebreaking capability in mind. Since the 1990s, the vast majority of ships capable of operating in ice without icebreaker escort have been fitted with Azipod propulsion system.

The first three Azipod units were of so-called "pushing" type in which the propeller is mounted behind the gondola. In the subsequent installations, ABB adopted the more efficient "pulling" configuration similar to propeller-driven airplanes.

The world's first cruise ship fitted with Azipod propulsion units, Elation, was delivered by Kværner Masa-Yards Helsinki shipyard in the spring of 1998. Even though the Azipod was initially developed for icebreaking vessels, cruise ships have become the largest group of ships by type to be fitted with Azipod propulsion system since the 1990s and the success of the electric podded propulsion units has paved the way for competitors such as the Rolls-Royce Mermaid. Among the vessels fitted with Azipod units are Royal Caribbean International's Voyager-, Freedom-, Oasis- and Icon-class cruise ships, each of which held the title of the largest cruise ship in the world at the time of delivery.

Another further development of the original electric podded propulsion concept is the Compact Azipod, a smaller Azipod unit introduced in the early 2000s. It is intended for smaller ships such as research vessels and yachts as well as dynamically positioned drilling rigs that may utilize up to eight such propulsors. The smaller Azipod Compact differs from the full-size unit by its permanent magnet synchronous motor which is directly cooled by sea water. For drilling vessels, it is also available in "pushing" configuration and can be fitted with a nozzle to increase bollard pull thrust in stationkeeping applications. Unlike the full-sized Azipod units which are assembled in Finland, the Compact Azipod units are manufactured in China.

=== Bearing-related problems ===
During the initial years in service, some widely publicised cruise ship service disruptions with the bigger Azipod V design have occurred.

The latest design, the Azipod X, incorporates these improvements, with a view to a service interval of five years, and features bearings that can be taken apart and repaired from inside the pod while the ship is harbored normally.

== See also ==
- Manoeuvring thruster
- Azimuth thruster
- Z-drive
- Cycloidal drive
- Rim-driven thruster
