= MS Eurodam =

Signature-class cruise ship

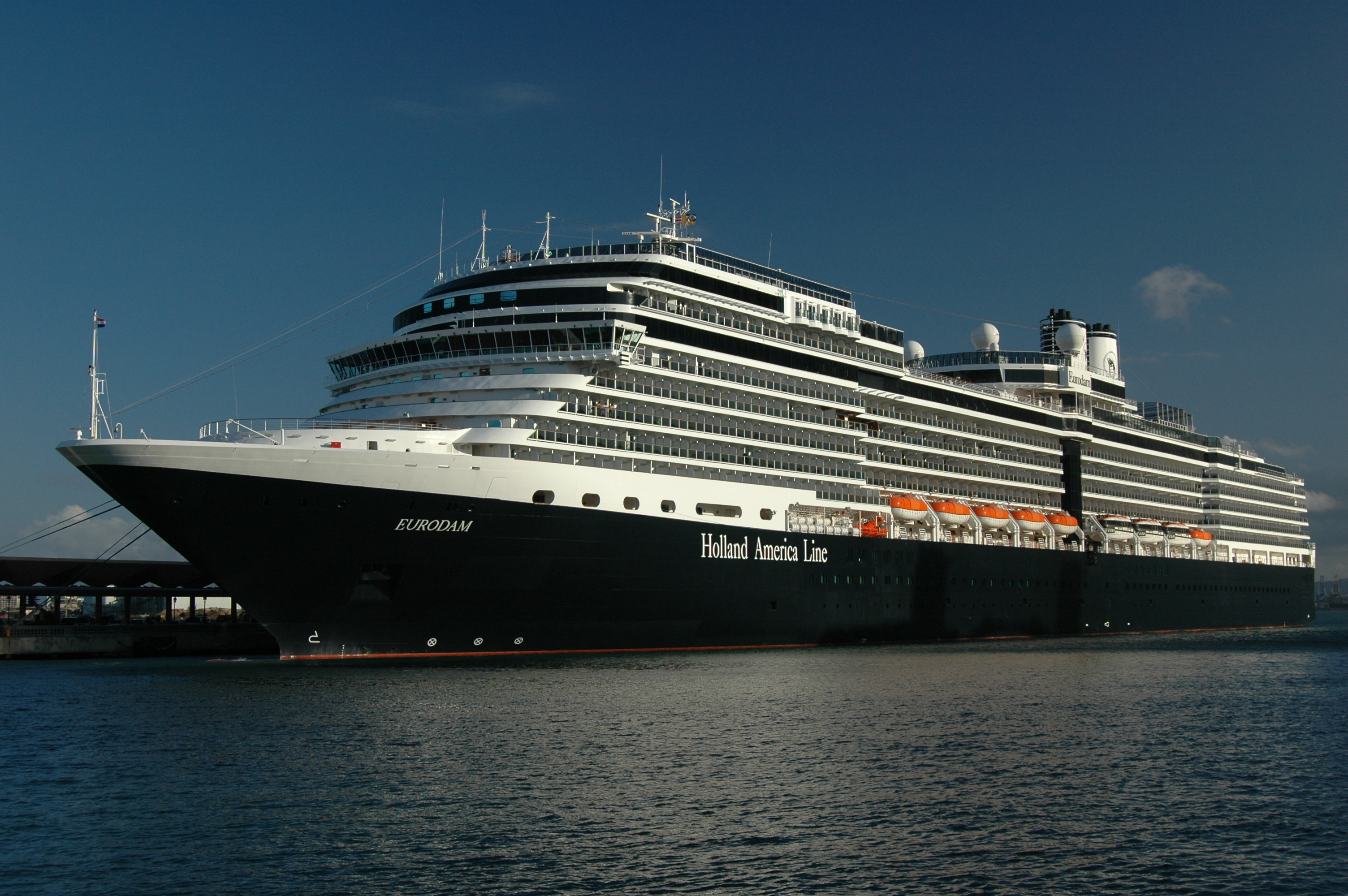
- MS Eurodam in San Juan

History
- Name: Eurodam
- Owner: Carnival Corporation & plc
- Operator: Holland America Line
- Port of registry: Netherlands, Rotterdam
- Builder: Fincantieri; Marghera, Italy
- Cost: United States
- Yard number: 6149
- Laid down: 9 February 2007
- Launched: 28 September 2007
- Christened: 1 July 2008; by Queen Beatrix of the Netherlands
- Completed: 16 June 2008
- Maiden voyage: 5 July 2008
- Identification: Call sign PHOS; IMO number: 9378448; MMSI number: 245206000
- Status: In service

General characteristics
- Class & type: Signature-class cruise ship
- Tonnage: 86,273 GT
- Length: 285.0 m (935 ft)
- Beam: 32.2 m (105.8 ft)
- Draft: 26 ft (8 m)
- Decks: 11 passenger decks
- Installed power: MaK M43C diesel engines; 64,000 kW (86,000 hp) (combined)
- Propulsion: Diesel-electric; two ABB Azipod units
- Speed: 23.9 knots (44.3 km/h; 27.5 mph) (max); (22 knots (41 km/h; 25 mph) (service)
- Capacity: 2,104 passengers
- Crew: 929

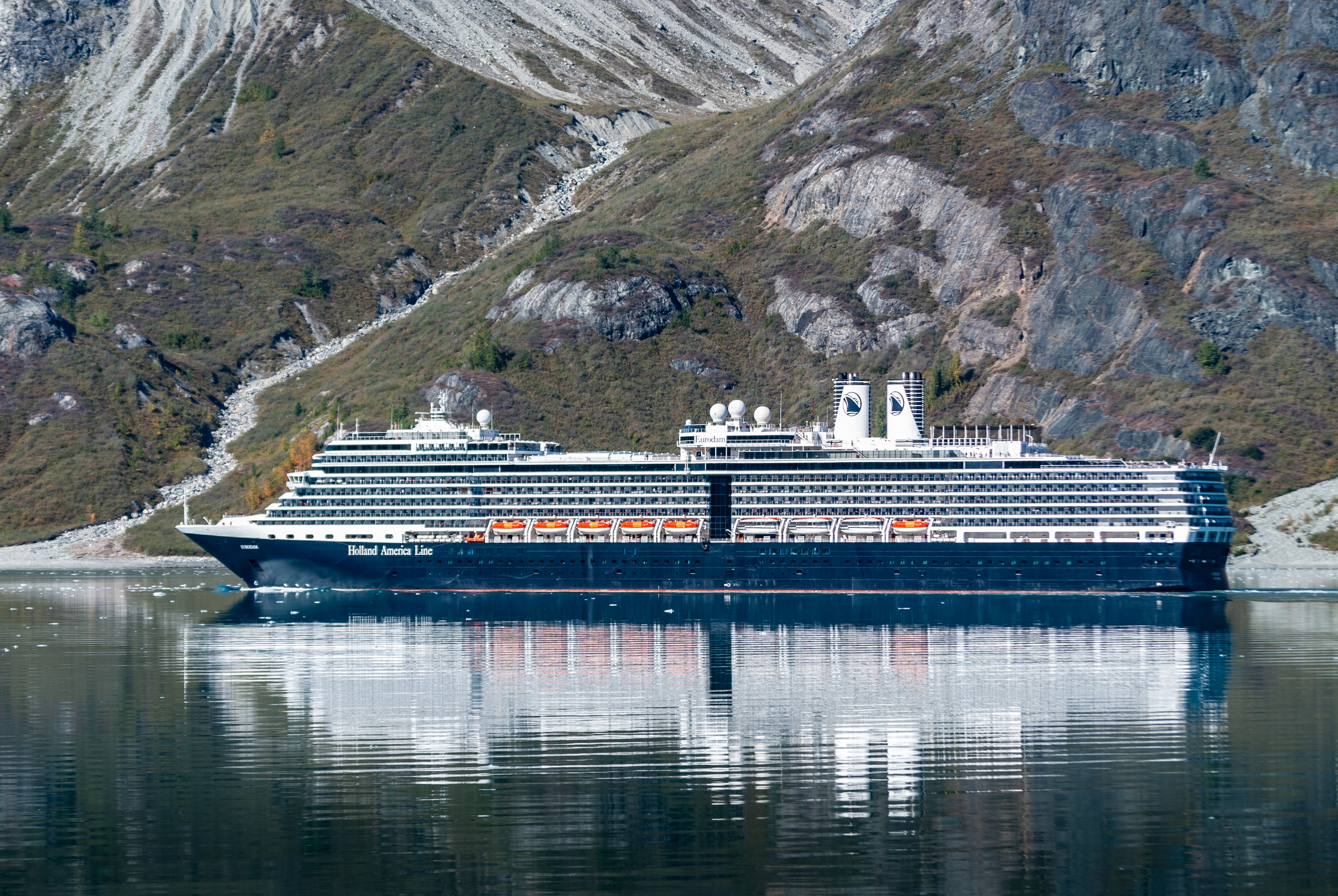
MS Eurodam in Glacier Bay, Alaska USA

MS Eurodam is a Signature-class cruise ship for Holland America Line. Eurodam is the 80th ship to enter Holland America's service, and at 86,700 tons and carrying 2,104 passengers, the 2nd largest of two HAL Signature-class ships, along with her slightly larger & newer sister ship MS Nieuw Amsterdam. She also has dynamic positioning abilities using three 1.9 MW (2,500 hp) bow thrusters and two 17.6 MW (23,600 hp) aft mounted Azipods. Total electrical power generation is 64 MW by six diesel generators.

== Service history ==
Eurodam was christened by Queen Beatrix of the Netherlands at Rotterdam, Netherlands on 1 July 2008 before embarking on its official 10-day maiden voyage from Copenhagen on 5 July.

In April and May, the ship operated in the Mediterranean and in Western Europe. From May to August, the ship visited the Baltic, Norway and the British Isles before embarking to Canada and New England in September and October. From late October to early April the ship traveled on alternating western and eastern Caribbean cruises.

Beginning in 2017, from May to September, the ship began operating Alaska inside passage cruises out of Seattle; from late October to early April, she travels on alternating western and eastern Caribbean out of Fort Lauderdale. Eurodam is scheduled to reposition in October 2018 and operate out of San Diego, from late October to early April, and visit Mexico, Hawaii, and the French Polynesia.

== Drydock ==
On 4 April 2011, Eurodam was drydocked for ten days in Freeport, Bahamas, this was the first time she had been refitted since construction in 2008.

On 20 December 2015 Eurodam re-entered service after a 14-day dry dock in the Bahamas.

Eurodam was in dry dock in Freeport, Bahamas from Feb 18 until March 4, 2023.

== Amenities ==
Similar in appearance to Holland America's Vista-class vessels, Eurodam features one additional deck and several interior layout differences.

On board the vessel are five dining rooms, including The Pinnacle Grill in partnership with Le Cirque.

The main atrium features artwork designed by Vincent Jansen and throughout the ship are reproductions of famous Dutch artists. The mainstage and theater seat 890 in the audience.

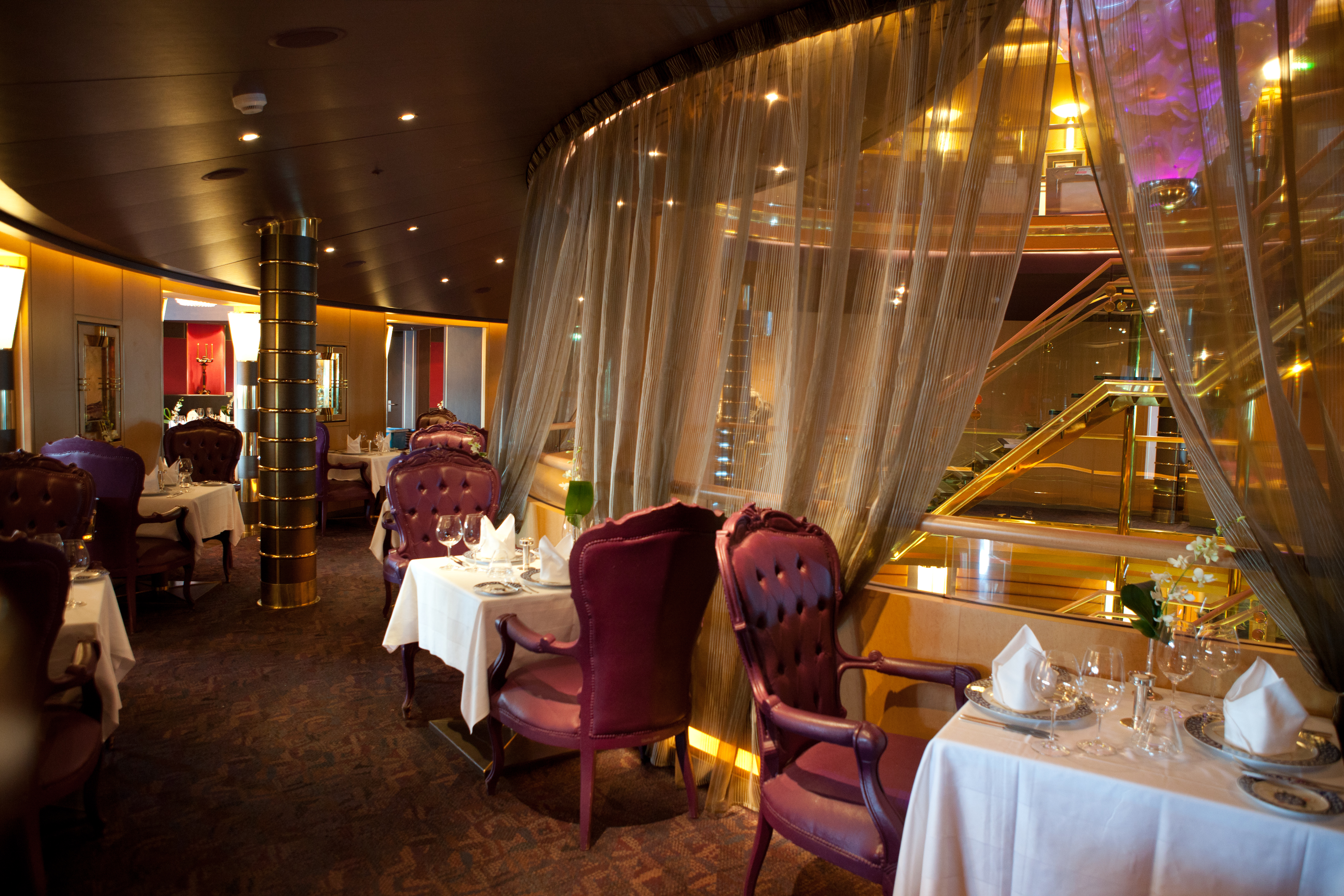
The Pinnacle Grill

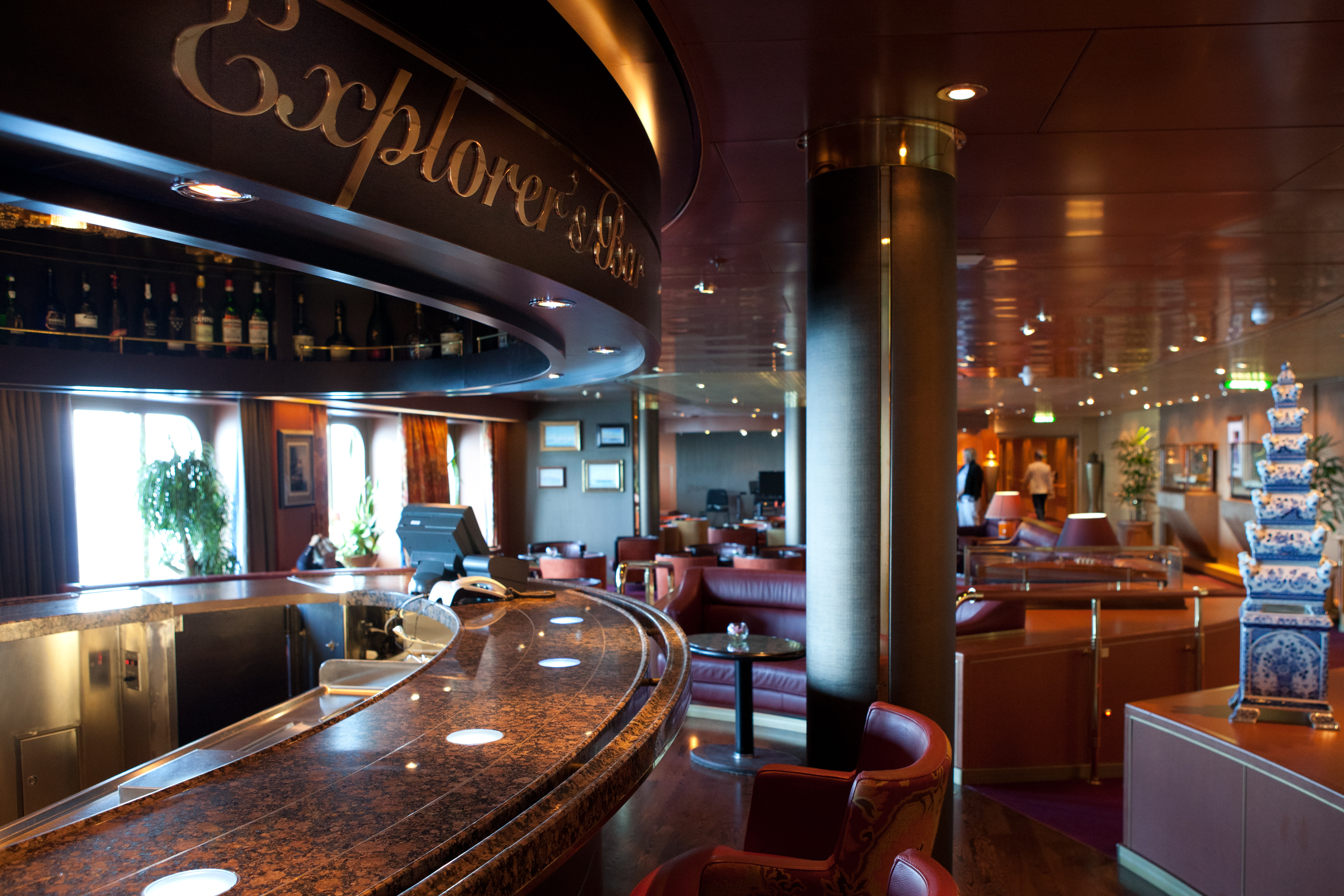
The Explorer's bar

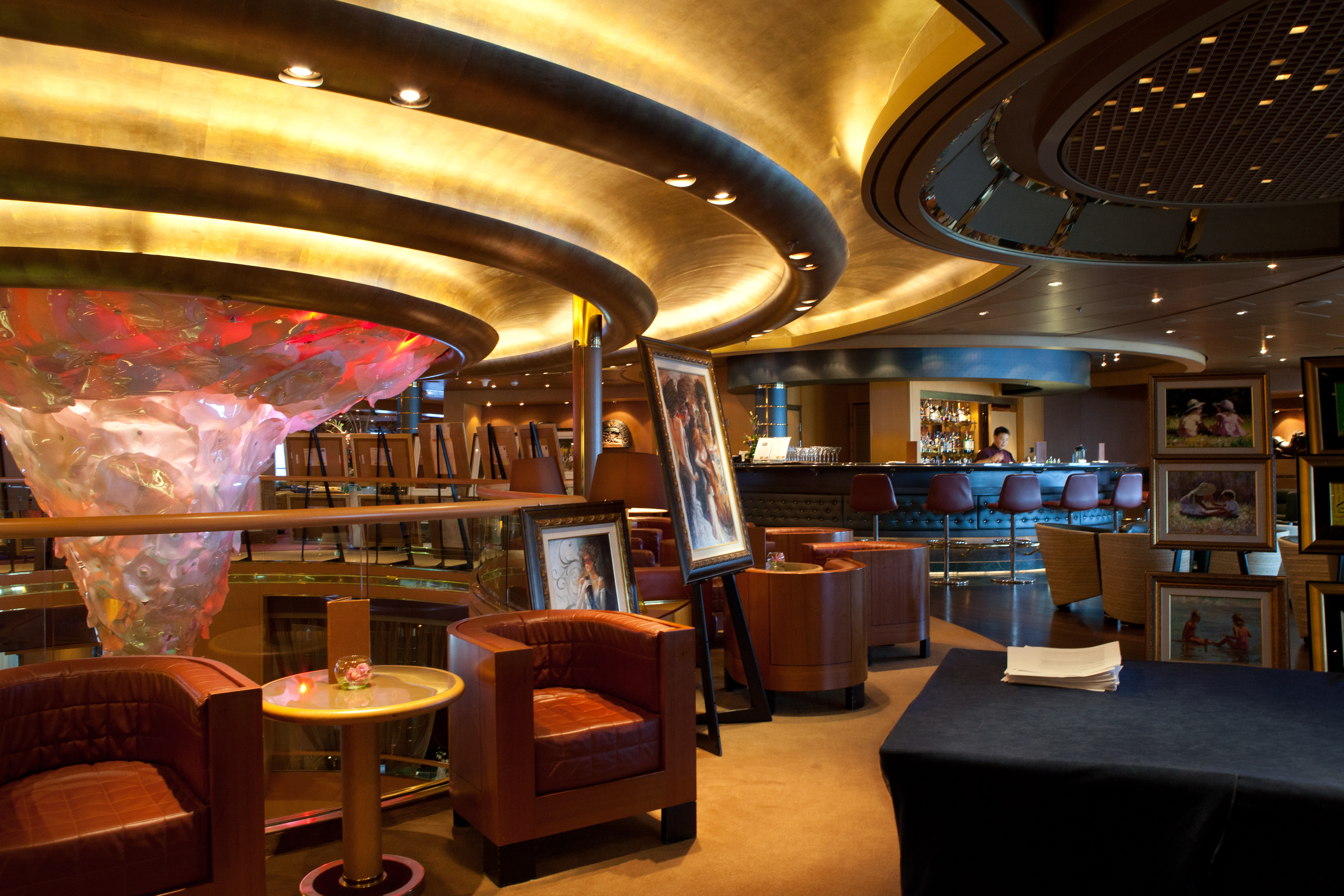
Atrium stairs

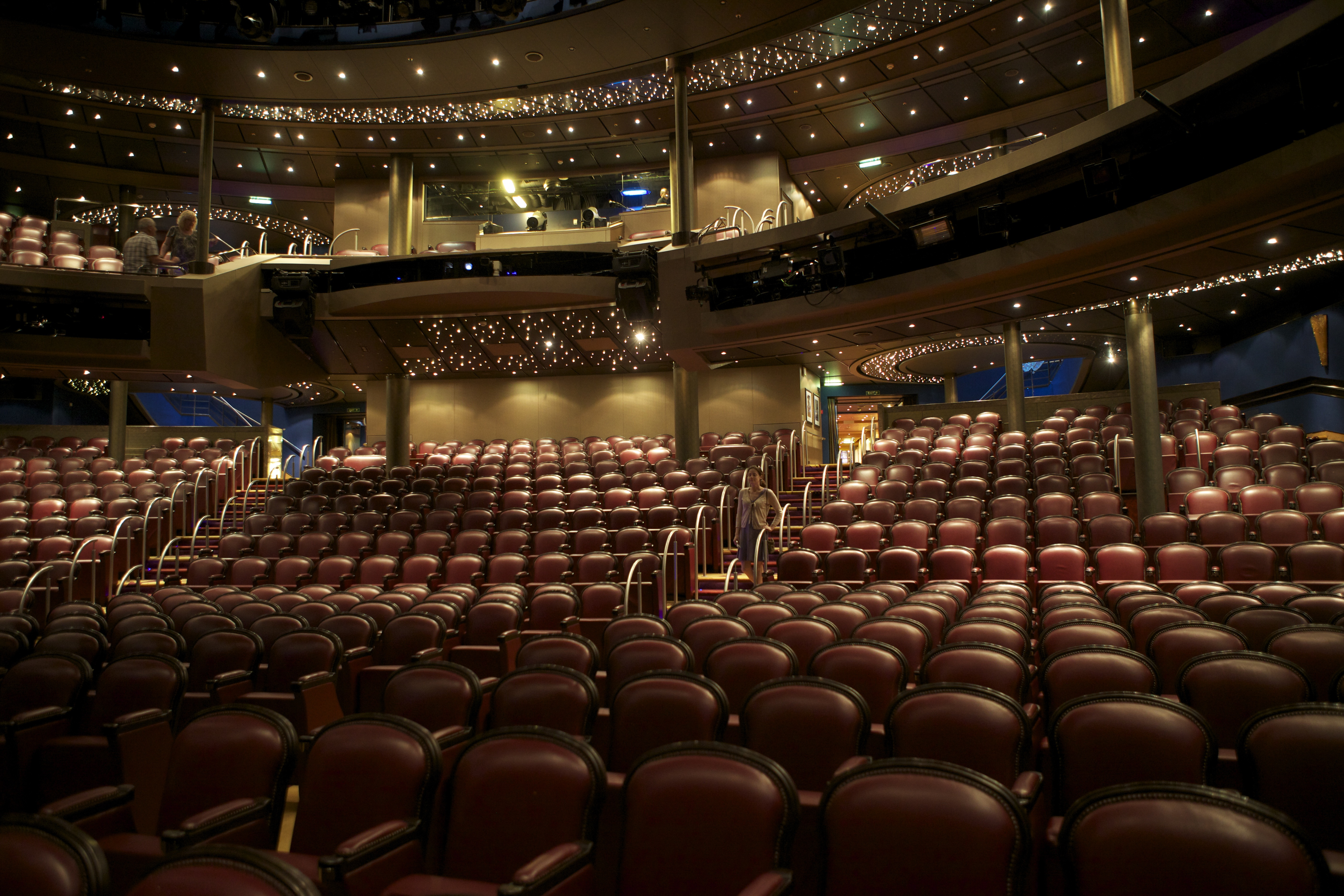
The mainstage

On 15 July 2017 Oprah Winfrey launched the inaugural "Share the adventure cruise" aboard Eurodam, an exclusive Holland America partnership with the Oprah Magazine O, with O Magazine-inspired activities including tai chi, meditation, an onboard O's book club, and healthy cooking demonstrations.

Eurodam set a cruise industry record by earning its 11th consecutive perfect score of 100 on a routine United States Public Health (USPH) inspection conducted by the U.S. Centers for Disease Control and Prevention (CDC) during its last unannounced CDC inspection on 14 January 2017 at homeport Port Everglades (Fort Lauderdale, Florida, US).
