= MS Zuiderdam =

Vista Class cruise ship

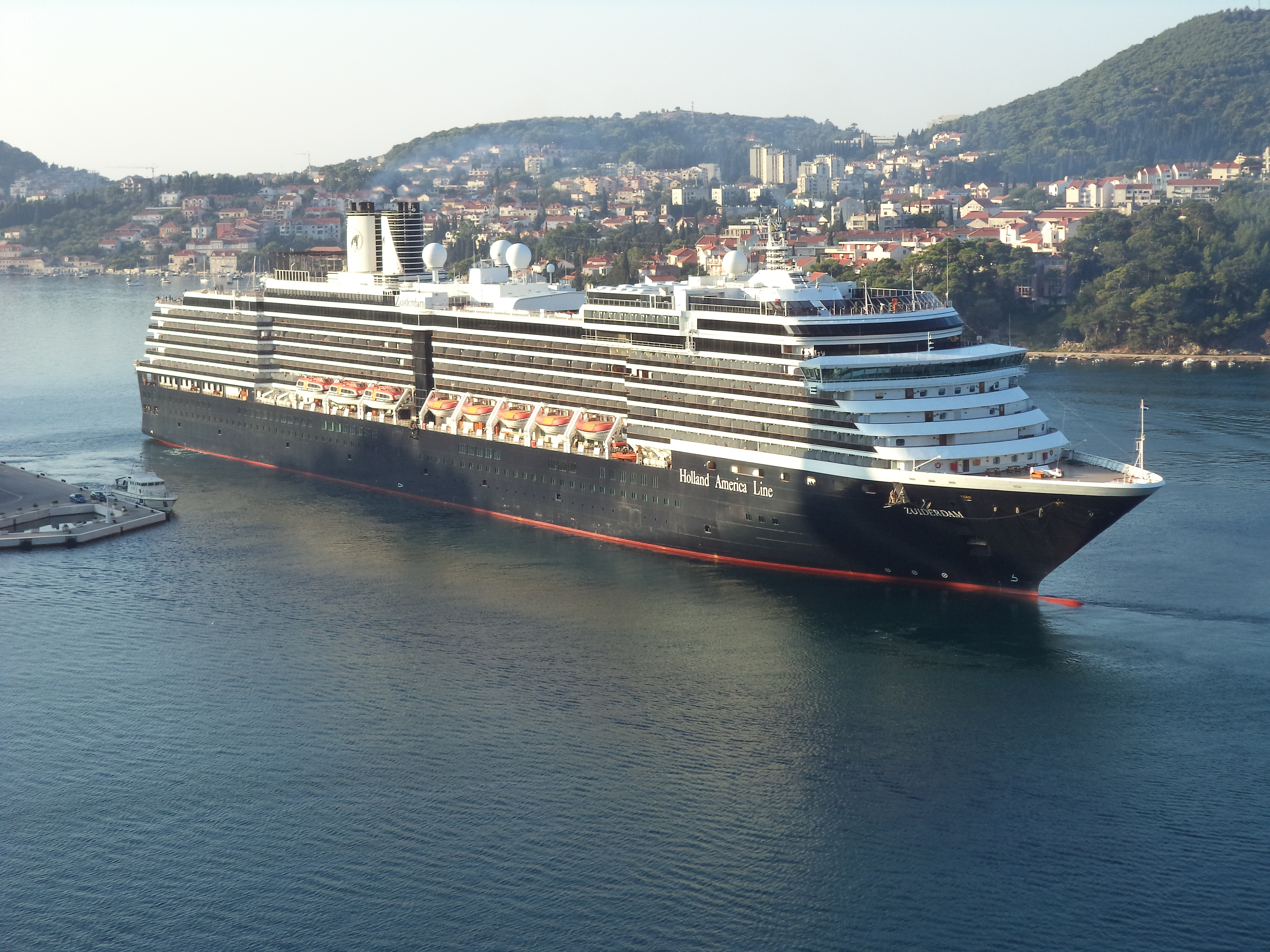
- Zuiderdam departing Dubrovnik

History
- Name: Zuiderdam
- Namesake: Named for the southern compass point
- Operator: Holland America Line
- Port of registry: Rotterdam, (Netherlands)
- Builder: Fincantieri
- Yard number: Marghera 6075
- Launched: 14 December 2001
- Acquired: 15 November 2002
- Maiden voyage: 14 December 2002
- In service: 14 December 2002
- Identification: Call sign PBIG; IMO number: 9221279; MMSI number: 245304000
- Status: In service

General characteristics
- Class & type: Vista-class cruise ship
- Tonnage: 81,769 GT; 10,965 DWT
- Length: 285 m (935 ft 0 in)
- Beam: 32 m (105 ft 0 in)
- Height: 57.83 m (189 ft 9 in) keel to funnel top
- Draught: 7.80 m (25 ft 7 in) max
- Decks: 11 passenger decks, 15 total
- Installed power: 1 × GE LM 2500 gas turbine, Sulzer (now Wärtsilä) ZAV40S 3 × 16-cylinder diesels, 2 × 12-cylinder diesels; combined 51,840 kW (69,520 hp)
- Propulsion: Azipod
- Speed: 24 knots (44 km/h; 28 mph) (maximum); 22 knots (41 km/h; 25 mph) (service)
- Capacity: 1,916 passengers; 2,272 passengers (maximum)
- Crew: 842

MS Zuiderdam /ˈzaɪdərdæm/ is a Vista-class cruise ship owned and operated by Holland America Line (HAL). It is the lead ship of the Vista-class vessels, so named for the extensive use of glass in their superstructure, and is sister to three other HAL ships, Oosterdam, Westerdam, and Noordam. The ship's name is a portmanteau of the Dutch word zuid, meaning 'south,' and the suffix -dam, a common Dutch placename suffix used in the names of all Holland America Line ships.

The ship shares similar exterior dimensions with Carnival Cruise Lines' and Costa Cruises' Spirit class. Cunard Line's Queen Victoria is an enlarged version of the same design, as is HAL's Signature class.

As with all Vista-class ships, Zuiderdam is equipped with a diesel-electric power plant and an Azipod propulsion system, and eighty-five percent of her staterooms have ocean views and sixty-seven percent have verandahs. Her art collection carries a Venetian theme throughout the ship; the most dazzling features figures in the time of Carnival in Venice, created by Daniel Ogier.

== Service history ==
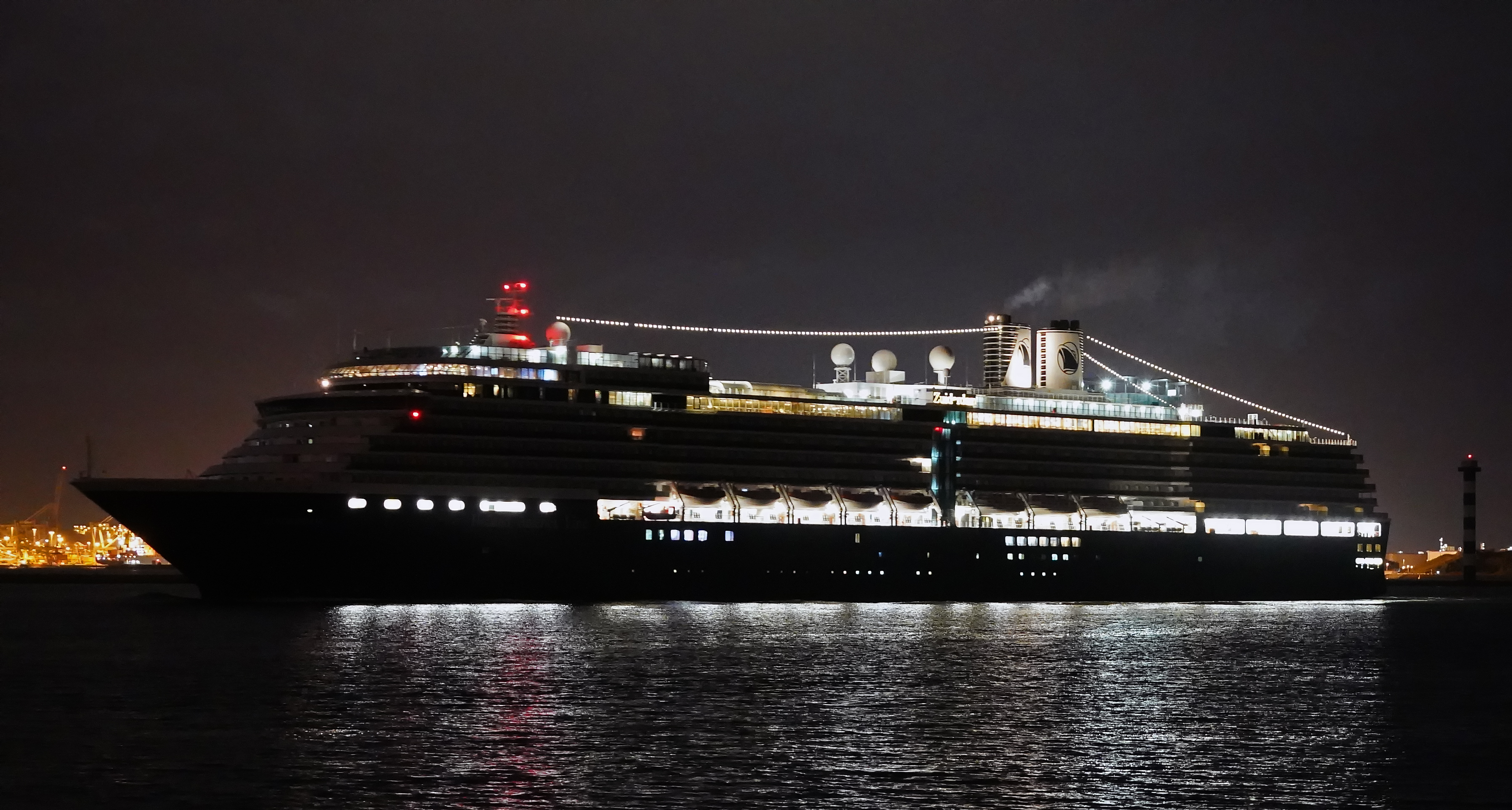
Zuiderdam at Hook of Holland on 16 August 2019

Zuiderdam was christened by American broadcaster Joan Lunden at Port Everglades on 14 December 2002. Between October and April, Zuiderdam largely runs a southern Caribbean itinerary which includes a half-transit of the Panama Canal through the Gatun Locks. From May to September, the vessel travels to Alaska or the Northern Europe/Baltic region.

On 9 June 2019, the ship's departure from the Kiel was delayed when members of the climate activist group Smash Cruiseshit used smaller boats to block the seaport.

== Technical information ==
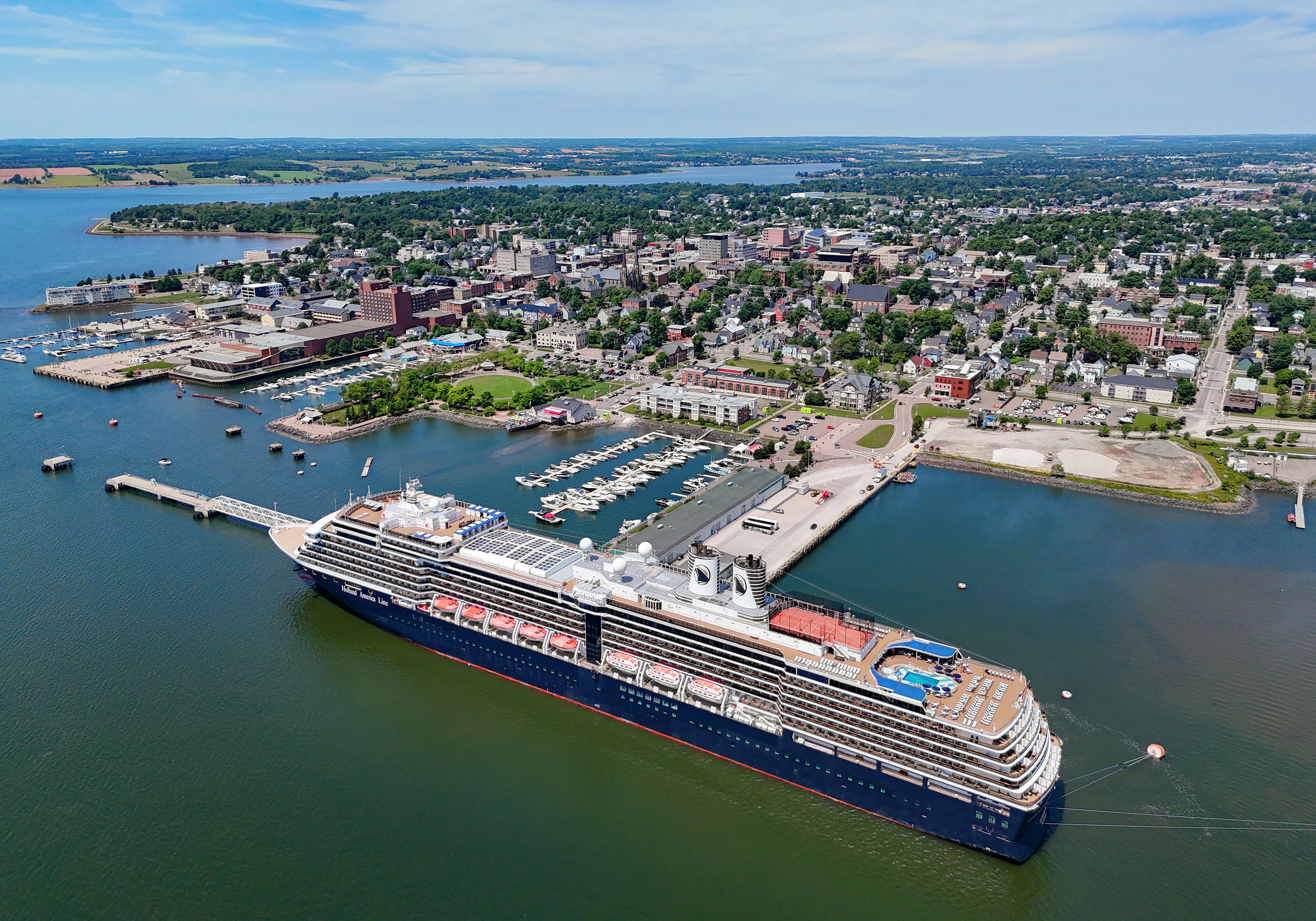
Zuiderdam at Charlottetown on 1 July 2025

The machinery spaces of Zuiderdam are vast and stretch along with two of its lowest decks for the most part of the vessel.

Zuiderdam is powered by a CODAG propulsion system encompassing five (three 16-cylinder and two 12-cylinder) Sulzer ZAV40S diesel engines (built under license by Grandi Motori Trieste, now owned by Wärtsilä, in Trieste, Italy) and a GE LM2500 Gas Turbine. Zuiderdam was the first Holland America Line ship to use a CODAG propulsion arrangement, a GE LM2500 turbine or ABB Azipod propulsors. It is propelled by two 17.62 MW, 160 rpm synchronous freshwater-cooled ABB Azipod propulsors.

The ship has the option to plugin whilst in port (and turnoff the engines), a process known as cold ironing

== Past Zuiderdams ==
The first vessel with the "Zuider" prefix was launched in 1912 as the 5,211-ton cargo ship Zuiderdijk; at the time, "dijk" or "dyk" was the suffix used for cargo vessels, "dam" was used for passenger ships. She sailed between Rotterdam and Savannah, Georgia, for Holland America through 1922 as well as during World War I as a transport.

The second NASM ship to have the name prefix "Zuider", and the first to be whole "Zuiderdam", was launched from a shipyard in Rotterdam for outfitting in 1941. However, on 28 August 1941, she was damaged by a British air raid. The ensuing blaze was fought for at least two days with sergeant W. Ollesch from the German Fire Regiment "Sachsen" killed while fighting the fire aboard the ship on 30 August 1941. The Germans raised her hull and re-floated her by 25 July 1942 only to be scuttled in order to block the port of Rotterdam to Allied forces by 22 September 1944. She was raised a final time after World War II, but the ship was never completed.
