= MS Oosterdam =

Cruise Ship built in 2003

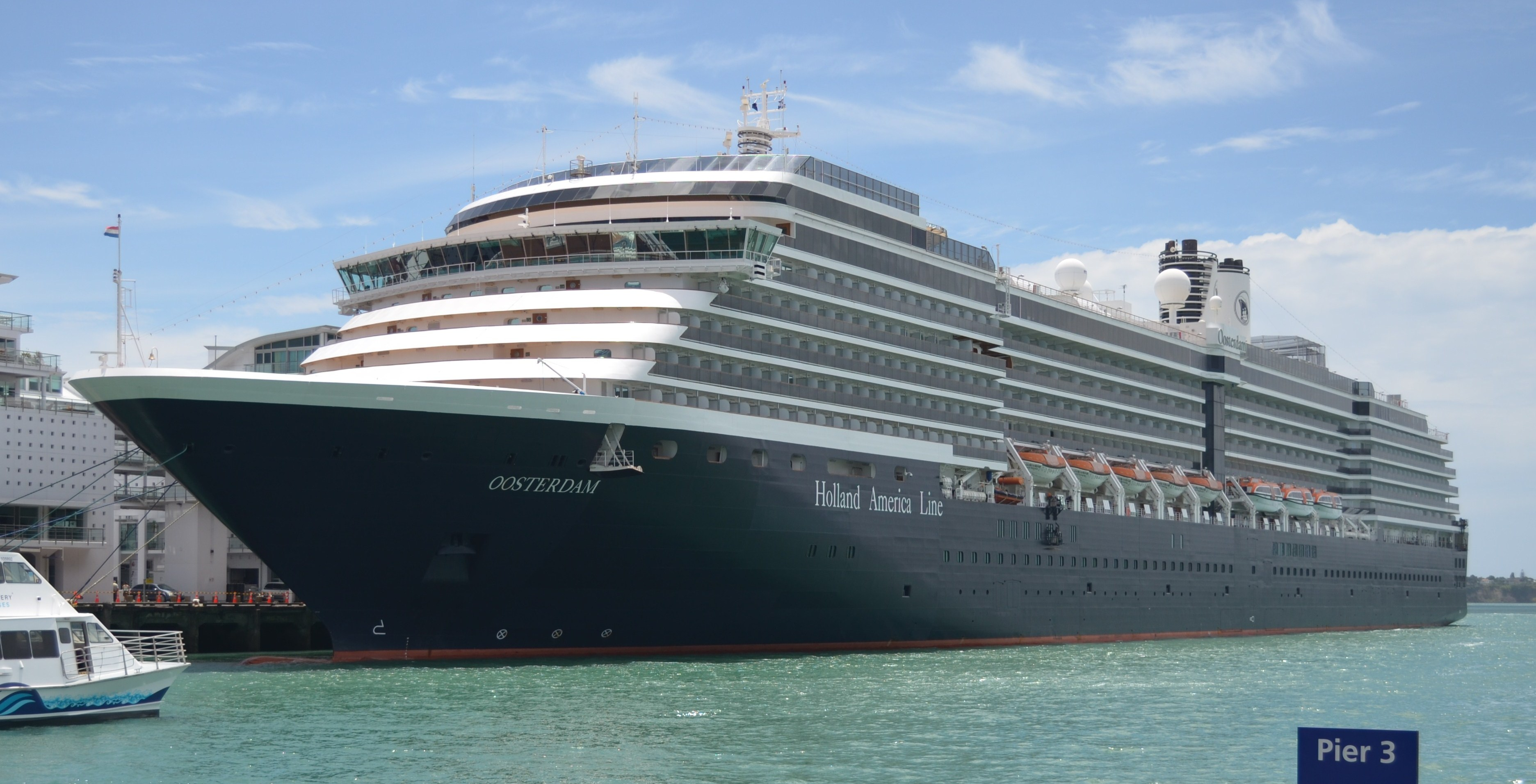
- Oosterdam docked at Auckland in 2013

History
- Name: Oosterdam
- Namesake: The eastern compass point
- Operator: Holland America Line
- Port of registry: Netherlands
- Builder: Fincantieri, Marghera, Italy
- Yard number: 6076
- Laid down: 16 January 2002
- Launched: 18 November 2002
- Christened: 27 July 2003
- Completed: 11 July 2003
- In service: 2003–present
- Identification: Call sign: PBKH; IMO number: 9221281; MMSI number: 245417000
- Status: in service

General characteristics
- Class & type: Vista-class cruise ship
- Tonnage: 82,305 GT; 10,965 DWT
- Length: 285.24 m (935 ft 10 in)
- Beam: 32.25 m (105 ft 10 in)
- Draught: 7.9 m (25 ft 11 in)
- Decks: 11 passenger decks
- Installed power: 3 × Sulzer 16ZAV40S diesel engines; 2 × Sulzer 12ZAV40S diesel engines; General Electric LM2500 gas turbine
- Propulsion: Diesel-electric; 2 × ABB Azipod (2 × 17.62 MW)
- Speed: 24 knots (44 km/h; 28 mph) (maximum); 22 knots (41 km/h; 25 mph) (service)
- Capacity: 1,964 passengers
- Crew: 812 crew
- Notes: Range is 18 days at 19.5 knots

MS Oosterdam (/ˈoʊstərdæm/ OH-ster-dam) is a Vista class cruise ship of the Holland America Line. Launched in 2002 as the line's second Vista, Oosterdam is sister to MS Noordam, Westerdam and Zuiderdam. The ship's name is a portmanteau of the Dutch word oost, meaning 'east,' and the suffix -dam, a common Dutch placename suffix used in the names of all Holland America Line ships.

== Christening ==
Oosterdam was christened by Princess Margriet of the Netherlands in Rotterdam on 29 July 2003, Holland America Line's founding city. The event was held over three days of celebrations marking the company's 130th anniversary. The joint flagship of the fleet, Rotterdam, joined Oosterdam bow to bow in welcoming her.

== Technical information ==
The machinery spaces aboard Oosterdam are vast and extend along two of its lowest decks for the most part of the vessel.

Oosterdam is powered by a CODAG propulsion system encompassing five Sulzer ZAV40S diesel engines (three 16-cylinder and two 12-cylinder, built under license by Grandi Motori Trieste in Trieste, Italy) and a General Electric LM2500 gas turbine. She is one of only a handful of merchant vessels that is powered by such an arrangement. It is propelled by two 17.62 MW (23956.53 ps), 160 rpm synchronous freshwater-cooled ABB Azipod propulsors. Its two engine rooms are separated by a watertight bulkhead. Each engine room is fully independent of the other, with its own fuel, lubricating, cooling and electrical distribution systems.

The ship's potable water is produced by three large Alfa Laval multi-effect flash evaporating desalination plants.

== History of the name Oosterdam ==
While no prior ship has been named Oosterdam, the first vessel with the "Ooster" prefix launched 1913 as the 8,251-ton, one-prop freighter Oosterdijk. At the time, "dijk" or "dyk" was the suffix used for cargo vessels, "dam" was used for passenger ships. She sailed between Rotterdam and Savannah, Georgia for Holland America as well as serving the Allied war effort during World War I.

== Areas of operation ==
In recent years, Oosterdam is sailing in the Mediterranean in summer and spending winters in South America.

The ship had previously been alternating fall/winter cruises along the Mexican Riviera and summer in Alaska. In the autumn of 2011, she visited Hawaii for the first time. After January 2012, Holland America paused visits to Mexico's west coast, in part due to safety concerns there in connection to the Mexican drug war and in part due to the depressed cruise market in Southern California; Oosterdam shifted to Hawaii, Australia and the South Pacific. Holland America was the first cruise line to resume service to Mazatlán in the autumn of 2013 with Veendam, and Oosterdam followed suit shortly thereafter.

On 4 May 2019, Oosterdam collided with Nieuw Amsterdam while docking stern to stern in Vancouver, British Columbia. There were no injuries reported and disembarkation on both ships proceeded as usual.
