= MS Noordam =

Cruise ship

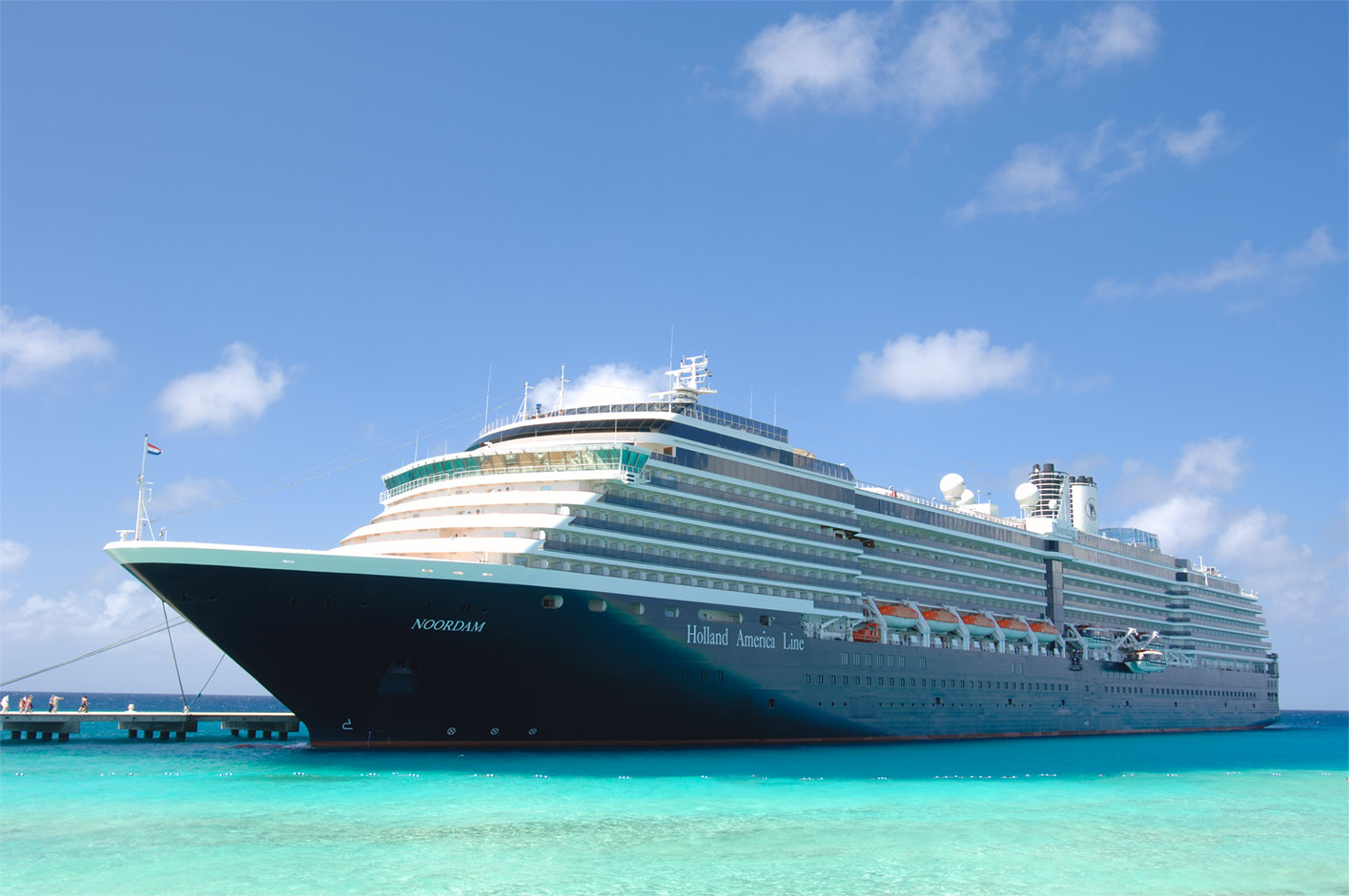
- Noordam docked at Grand Turk Island, March 2007

History
- Name: MS Noordam
- Namesake: The northern compass point
- Operator: Holland America Line
- Port of registry: Netherlands
- Builder: Fincantieri
- Yard number: Marghera 6079
- Launched: 1 April 2005
- Christened: February 2006
- In service: 2006–present
- Identification: Call sign PHET; IMO number: 9230115; MMSI number: 246028000
- Status: in service

General characteristics
- Class & type: Vista class cruise ship
- Tonnage: 82,500 gross tonnage (GT)
- Length: 285.3 m (936 ft)
- Beam: 32.2 m (105.8 ft)
- Decks: 11 passenger decks
- Propulsion: Diesel-electric; two ABB Azipod units
- Speed: maximum 23-knot (43 km/h), service 20-knot (37 km/h)
- Capacity: 1,916 passengers
- Crew: 800 crew

MS Noordam is a member of Holland America Line's Vista class, and the fourth Holland America Line vessel to bear the name. The ship was christened on February 22, 2006, in New York City by the actress Marlee Matlin. Noordam is a sister ship of MS Oosterdam, MS Westerdam, and MS Zuiderdam, alongside five other Vista-class ships. The ship's name is a portmanteau of the Dutch word noord, meaning 'north,' and the suffix -dam, a common Dutch placename suffix used in the names of all Holland America Line ships.

== Design ==
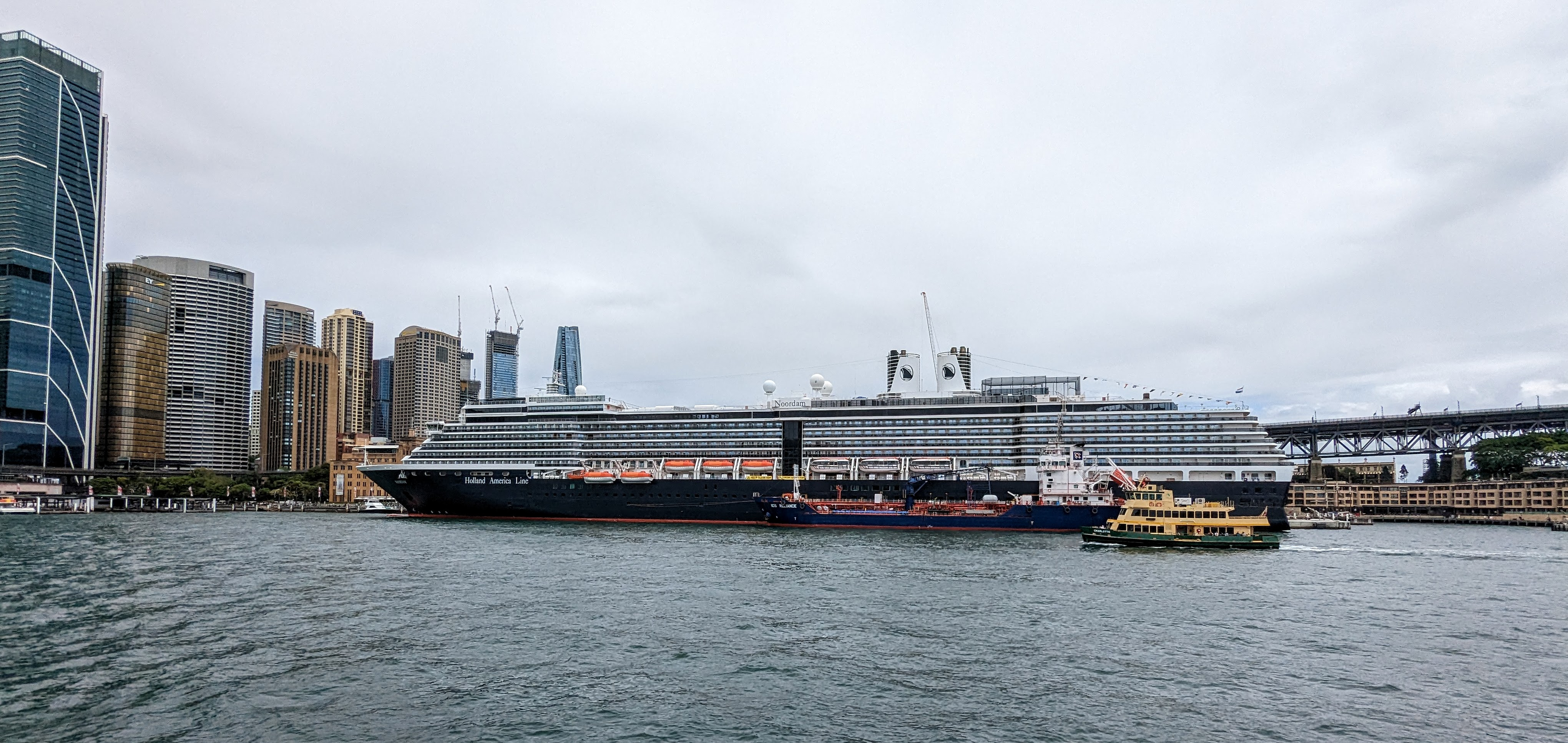
Noordam at Sydney Harbour, being refueled by fuel tanker ICS Reliance

The ship is powered by a CODAG arrangement of five diesel generators (3 x 16,000 HP units, and 2 x 12,000 HP units) and one gas turbine (18,000 HP), for a total power output of approximately 62.6MW (84,000 HP). The power generated is used both for propulsion, via two 17.5MW (23,467 HP) ABB Azipods, and the ship's "hotel load," which includes HVAC and freshwater production. She is capable of producing 1,700 tons (450,000 gallons) of fresh water daily via desalinization, although average consumption is only around 750 tons/day (200,000 gallons). The ship consumes approximately 216 tons/day (57,000 U.S. gallons) of diesel oil, and 90 tons/day (23,000 U.S. gallons) of marine gas oil, at peak power production. She can achieve a maximum speed of approximately 24 knots (44 km/h; 28 mph).

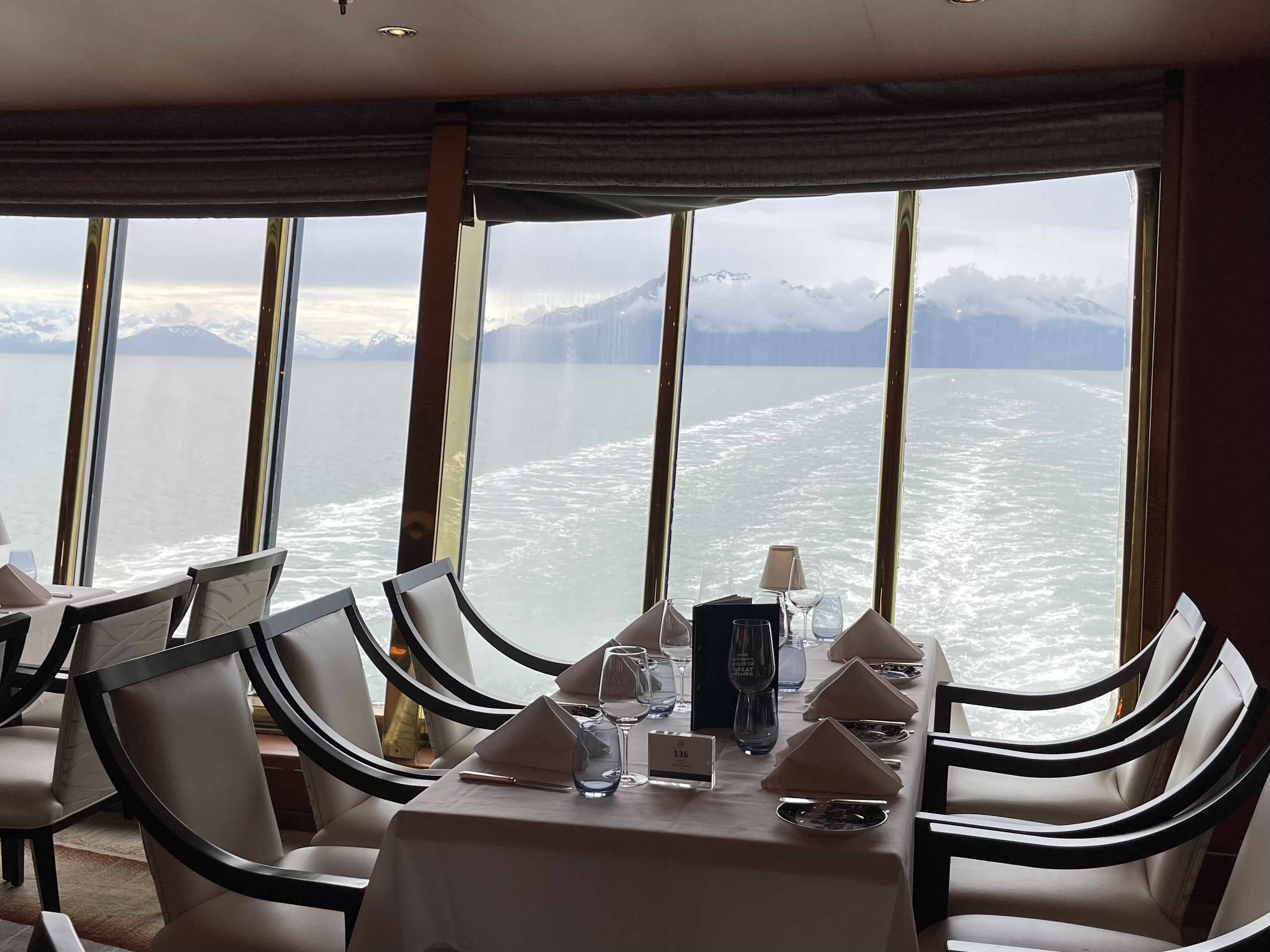
Dining with a view – MS Noordam's general dining room, Glacier Bay Alaska
