= Vista-class cruise ship (2002) =

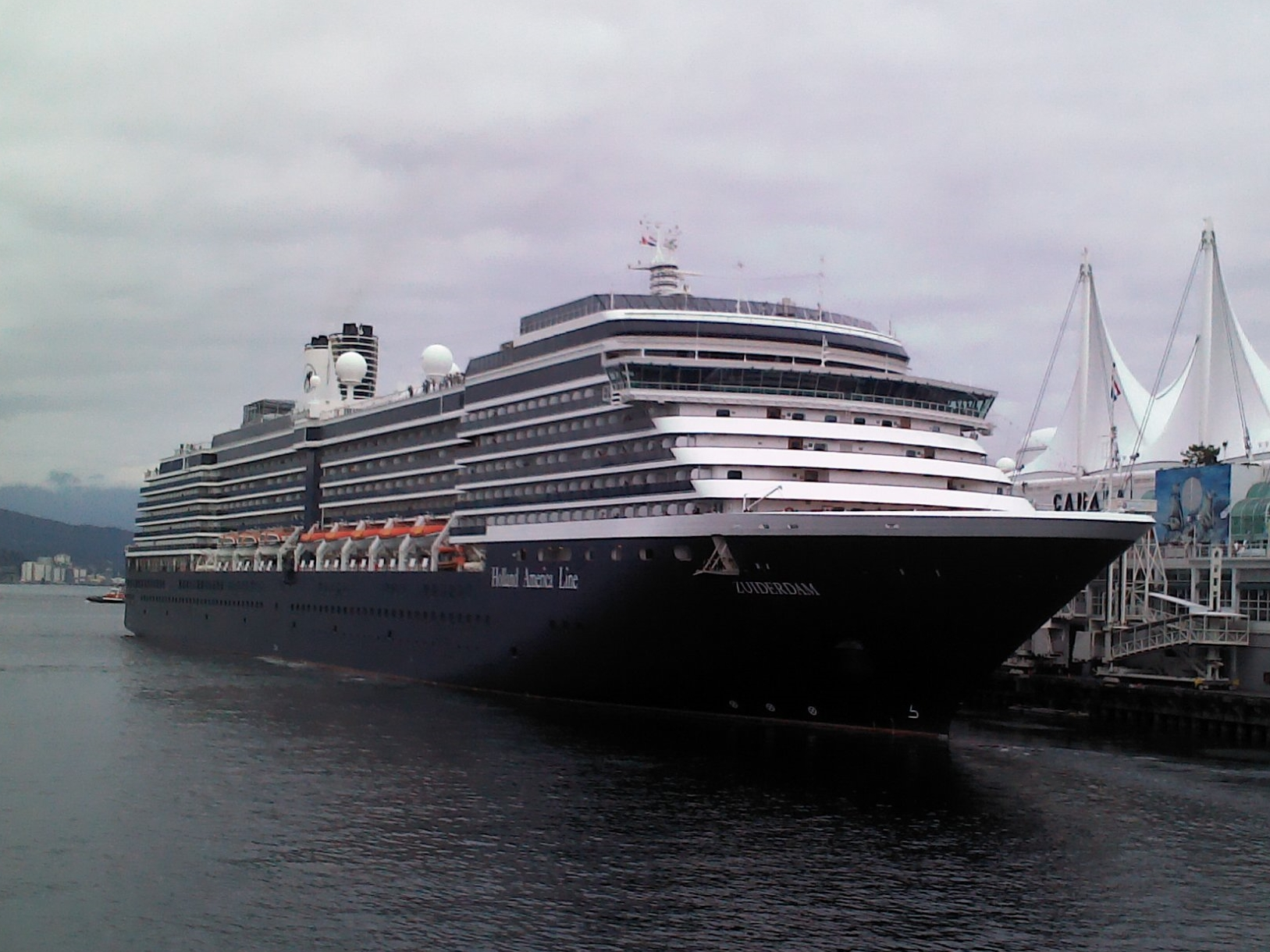
- MS Zuiderdam, the lead ship of the Vista class docked in Vancouver, Canada, August 2013

Class overview
- Builders: Fincantieri Marghera shipyard, Italy
- Operators: Holland America Line; P&O Cruises; Cunard Line; Costa Cruises; Carnival Cruise Line
- Preceded by: Rotterdam class
- Succeeded by: Pinnacle class
- Subclasses: Signature class; Vista Spirit hybrid class
- Built: 2001–2010
- In service: 2002–present
- Planned: 9
- Completed: 9
- Active: 9

General characteristics
- Type: Cruise ship
- Length: Varies
- Beam: 32.23 m (105 ft 9 in)
- Decks: 11 passenger decks
- Installed power: Diesel-electric
- Propulsion: Azipod
- Speed: 24 knots (44 km/h; 28 mph) maximum
- Capacity: varies by configuration; 1,848–1,952 (2 berths/cabin); 2,272–2,388 maximum
- Crew: 800–976

The Vista class is a class of Panamax-type cruise ships, built by Fincantieri at their Marghera shipyard, in Italy for Carnival Corporation subsidy lines Holland America Line, P&O Cruises, Cunard Line, Costa Cruises, and Carnival Cruise Line. It is a design platform that was developed by Carnival that utilised various iterations of the same platform for over two decades.

== History ==
The Vista-class design was created by Carnival Corporation for its Holland America Line, using the Panamax guidelines to determine their designed size. The predecessors to the class was Costa Cruises and Carnival Cruise Line's Spirit class starting with Costa Atlantica and Carnival Spirit.

The ships are equipped with a diesel-electric power plant and an Azipod propulsion system. The ships are designed so that eighty-five percent of the staterooms have ocean views and sixty-seven percent have verandas; the extensive use of glass in the superstructure, (including glass elevators located amidship), is also reflected in the Vista-class name.

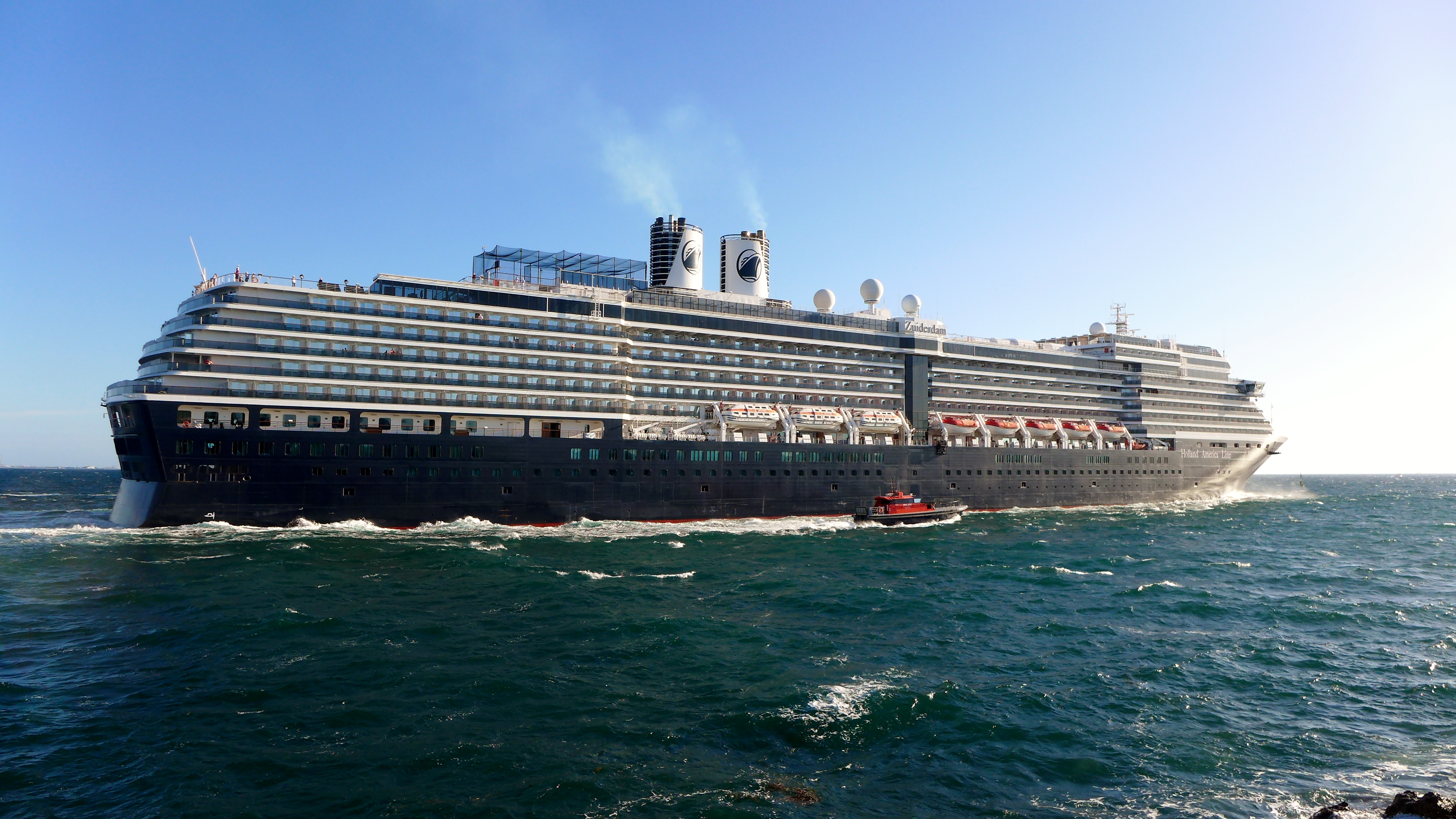
Zuiderdam, the first ship of the Vista class platform

The first ship is the modified Spirit class design was Zuiderdam in 2002.

== Derivative designs ==
=== Signature class ===
A fifth hull which was originally intended for Holland America was transferred to Cunard Line in 2003 where it was planned to become MS Queen Victoria. However, due to restructuring within their parent corporation Carnival Corporation & plc, as well as a later decision by Cunard that modifications should be made to introduce successful elements from the design of RMS Queen Mary 2, the hull was again transferred to become P&O Cruises' MS Arcadia. This would become the first of the modified Vista-Class platform and become known as the Signature class for Holland America.

The second derivative design is Holland America Line's Signature-class cruise ship, MS Eurodam. While the same length as Noordam, she has one more deck than the standard Vista-class design, and her public areas and cabin placement have been significantly redesigned, especially on her upper-most decks (to accommodate the additional 190 passengers berthed just below the popular Crow's Nest). A second Signature-class ship, MS Nieuw Amsterdam, entered service in 2010.

=== Hybrid Vista/Spirit class ===
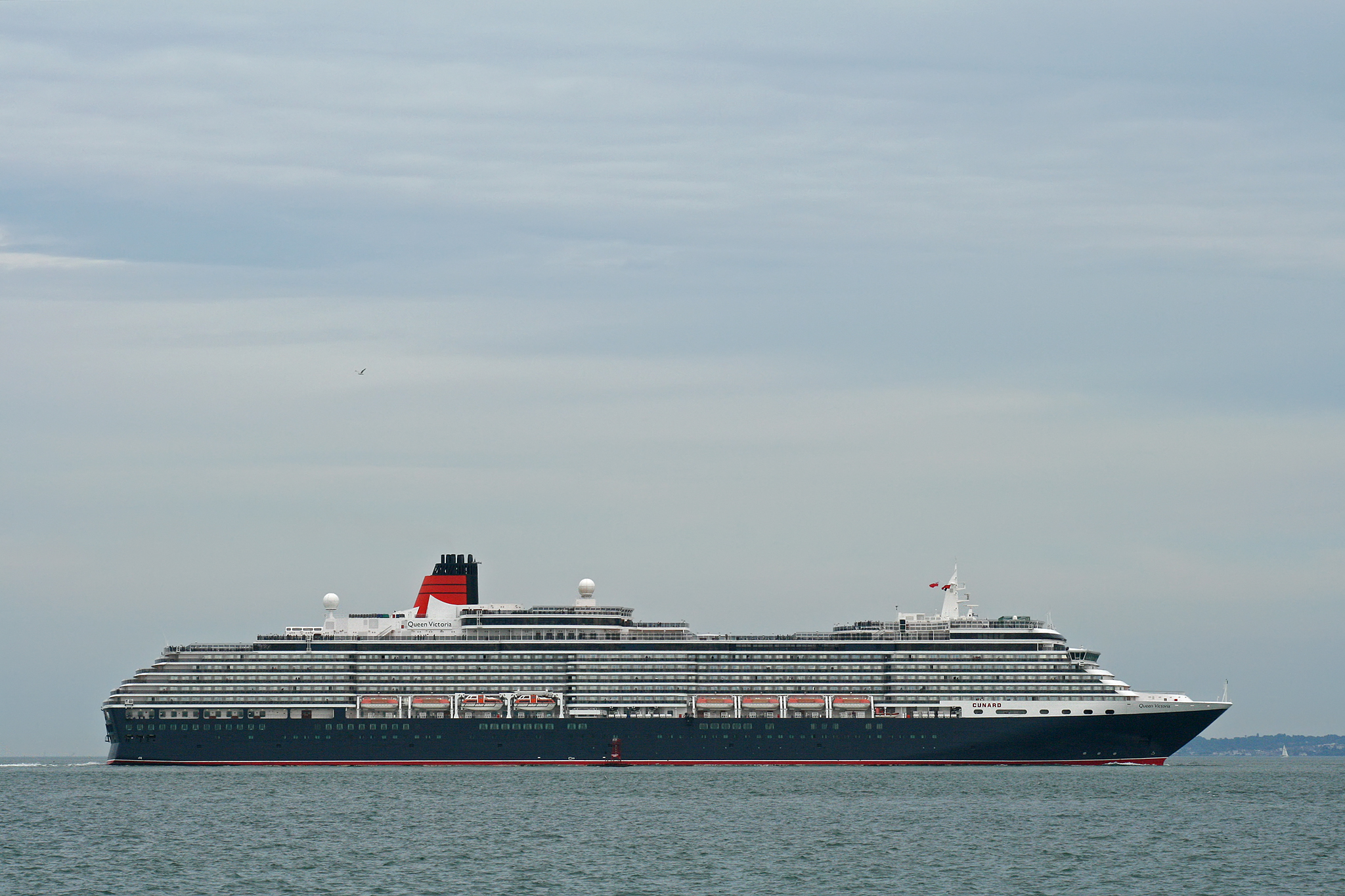
Enlarged Vista-class ship Queen Victoria passing Calshot Spit light buoy outward bound from Southampton

In 2007 Cunard took delivery of Queen Victoria the first ship in a class described as a hybrid design "taking the best parts from Aker Yards' [sic] built Costa Atlantica and Costa Mediterranea, and from Holland America's Vista class ships". Subsequent ships based on this hybrid design include Costa's Costa Luminosa, Cunard's Queen Elizabeth, and Costa Deliziosa.

=== Pinnacle class ===
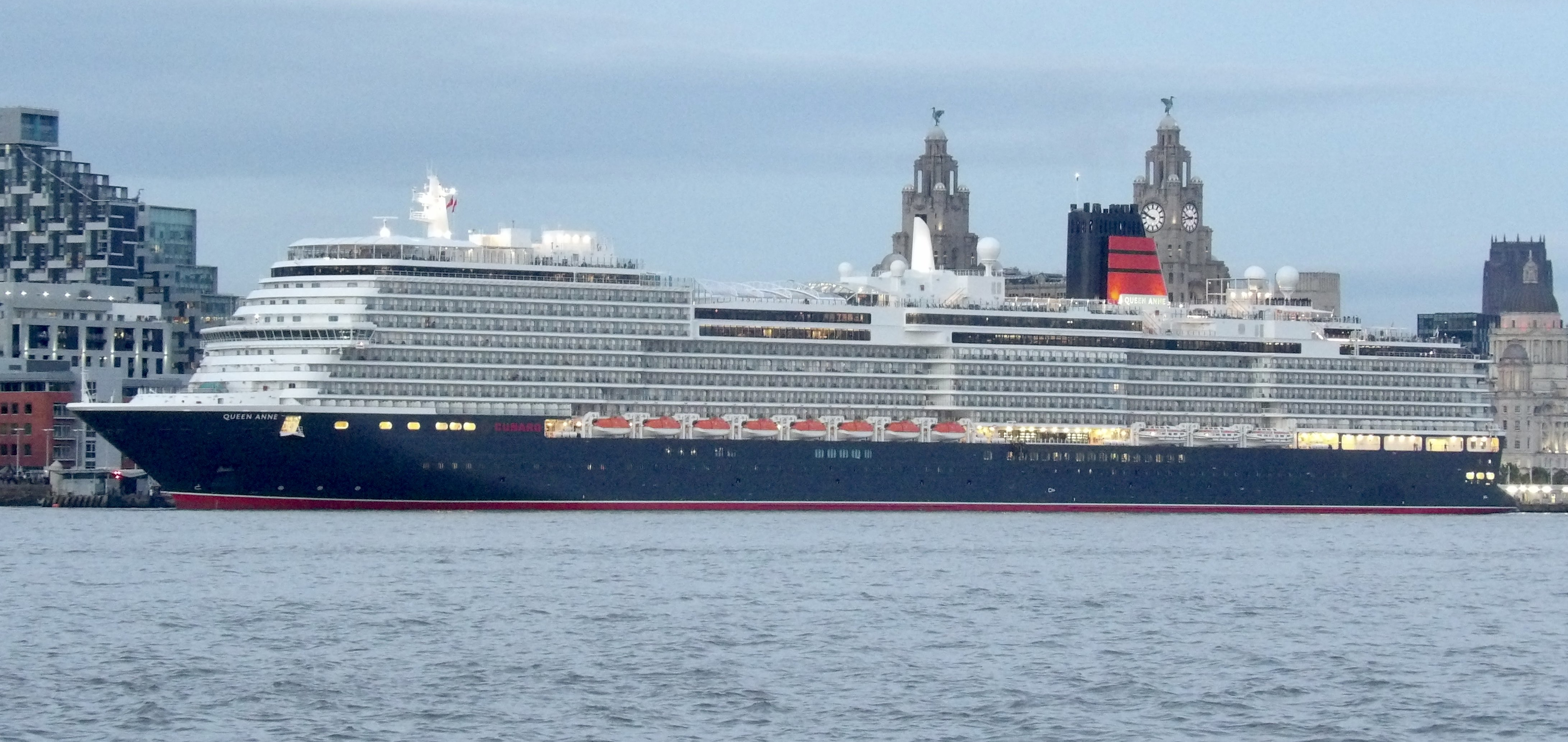
Queen Anne, last ship in Carnival Corps over 20 year Vista class platform

The final iteration of the Vista class debuted with Koningsdam for Holland America Line followed by Nieuw Statendam and Rotterdam. The final ship was a stretched version for Cunard line named Queen Anne, debuting in 2024.

== Ships by delivery date ==
Ship	Built	Operator	Builder	Tonnage	Dimensions	Class	Image
Zuiderdam	2002	Holland America Line	Fincantieri Marghera shipyard, Italy	82,305 GT	285 m (936 ft)	Vista 1	
Oosterdam	2003	Holland America Line	Fincantieri Marghera shipyard, Italy	82,305 GT	285 m (936 ft)	Vista 1	
Westerdam	2004	Holland America Line	Fincantieri Marghera shipyard, Italy	82,305 GT	285 m (936 ft)	Vista 1	
Noordam	2006	Holland America Line	Fincantieri Marghera shipyard, Italy	82,500 GT	285 m (936 ft)	Vista 1	
Arcadia	2005	P&O Cruises	Fincantieri Marghera shipyard, Italy	84,342 GT	289.90 m (951 ft 1 in)	Vista 1 (Vista Stretched)	
Queen Victoria	2007	Cunard Line	Fincantieri Marghera shipyard, Italy	92,700 GT	294.0 m (964.5 ft)	Vista 2 (Vista Spirit Hybrid Stretched)	
Eurodam	2008	Holland America Line	Fincantieri Marghera shipyard, Italy	86,273 GT	285 m (935 ft)	Vista 3 (Signature)	
Carnival Luminosa	2009	Carnival Cruise Line	Fincantieri Marghera shipyard, Italy	92,700 GT	293.5 m (962 ft 11 in)	Vista 4 (Vista Spirit Hybrid)	
Costa Deliziosa	2010	Costa Cruises	Fincantieri Marghera shipyard, Italy	92,700 GT	293.5 m (962 ft 11 in)	Vista 4 (Vista Spirit Hybrid)	
Queen Elizabeth	2010	Cunard Line	Fincantieri Marghera shipyard, Italy	92,700 GT	294 m (964 ft 7 in)	Vista 2 (Vista Spirit Hybrid Stretched)	
Nieuw Amsterdam	2010	Holland America Line	Fincantieri Marghera shipyard, Italy	86,700 GT	285.3 m (936 ft 0 in)	Vista 3 (Signature)	
Koningsdam	2016	Holland America Line	Fincantieri Marghera shipyard, Italy	99,863 GT	299.65 m (983 ft 1 in)	Vista 5 (Pinnacle)	
Nieuw Statendam	2018	Holland America Line	Fincantieri Marghera shipyard, Italy	99,863 GT	299.65 m (983 ft 1 in)	Vista 5 (Pinnacle)	
Rotterdam	2020	Holland America Line	Fincantieri Marghera shipyard, Italy	99,863 GT	299.65 m (983 ft 1 in)	Vista 5 (Pinnacle)	
Queen Anne	2024	Cunard Line	Fincantieri Marghera shipyard, Italy	113,000 GT	322.51 m (1,058 ft 1 in)	Vista 6 (Pinnacle Stretched)	

== Similar Panamax ships ==
- Spirit class, a similar class of Panamax ships operated by Carnival Cruise Line.
- Radiance class, a similar class of Panamax ships operated by Royal Caribbean International
- Millennium class, Panamax ships for Celebrity Cruises
- Coral Princess and Island Princess, a similar set of Panamax ships operated by Princess Cruises
