= MS Westerdam =

Vista Class cruise ship owned by Holland America Line

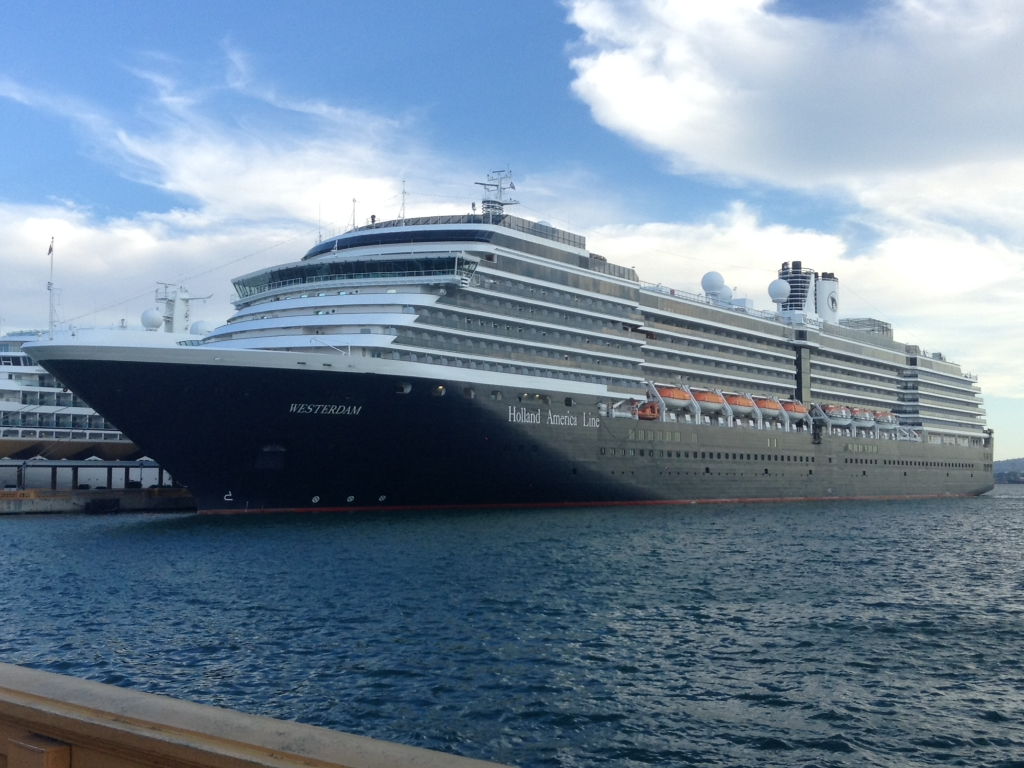
- Westerdam at San Juan, Puerto Rico in 2015

History
- Name: Westerdam
- Namesake: Western compass point
- Operator: Holland America Line
- Port of registry: Netherlands
- Builder: Fincantieri, Marghera, Italy
- Launched: 16 July 2003
- Christened: April 2004
- In service: 2004–present
- Identification: IMO number: 9226891; MMSI number: 244128000; Callsign: PINX
- Status: In service

General characteristics (as built)
- Class & type: Vista-class cruise ship
- Tonnage: 81,811 GT
- Length: 285.3 m (936 ft)
- Beam: 32.2 m (105.8 ft)
- Decks: 11 passenger decks
- Propulsion: Diesel-electric; ABB Azipods
- Speed: 24 knots (44 km/h; 28 mph) (maximum); 22 knots (41 km/h; 25 mph) (service)
- Capacity: 1,964 passengers
- Crew: 800

General characteristics (following April 2007 refit)
- Tonnage: 82,500 GT
- Capacity: 1,964 passengers

MS Westerdam is a Vista-class cruise ship owned by Holland America Line. She is the third ship of the class to be operated by the line, as well as being the third ship to bear the name Westerdam. Her sister ships are Oosterdam, Zuiderdam, and Noordam. The ship's name is a portmanteau of the Dutch word west, the same as 'west' in English, and the suffix -dam, a common Dutch placename suffix used in the names of all Holland America Line ships.

== Construction and career ==
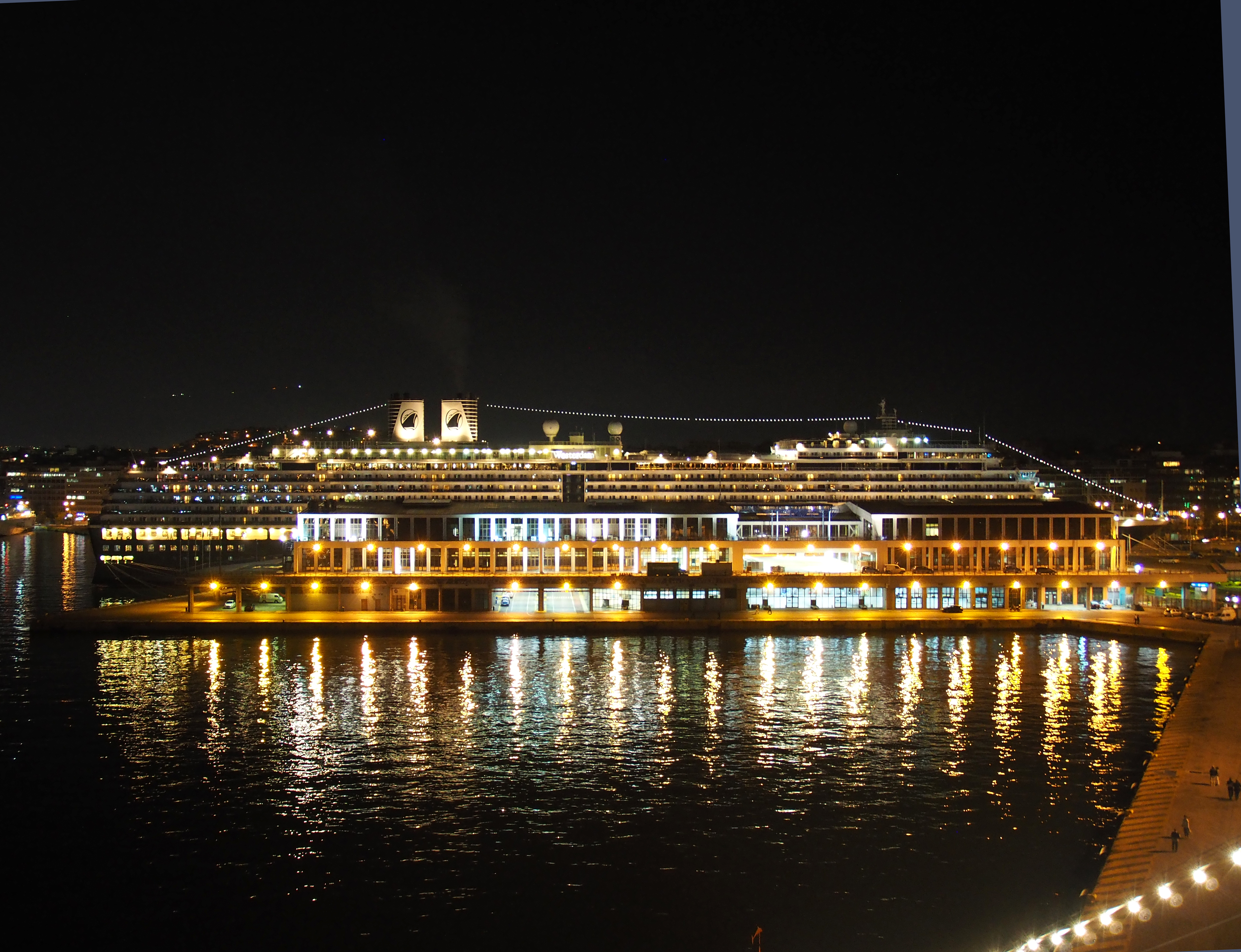
Westerdam at a terminal in Hafen von Piräus

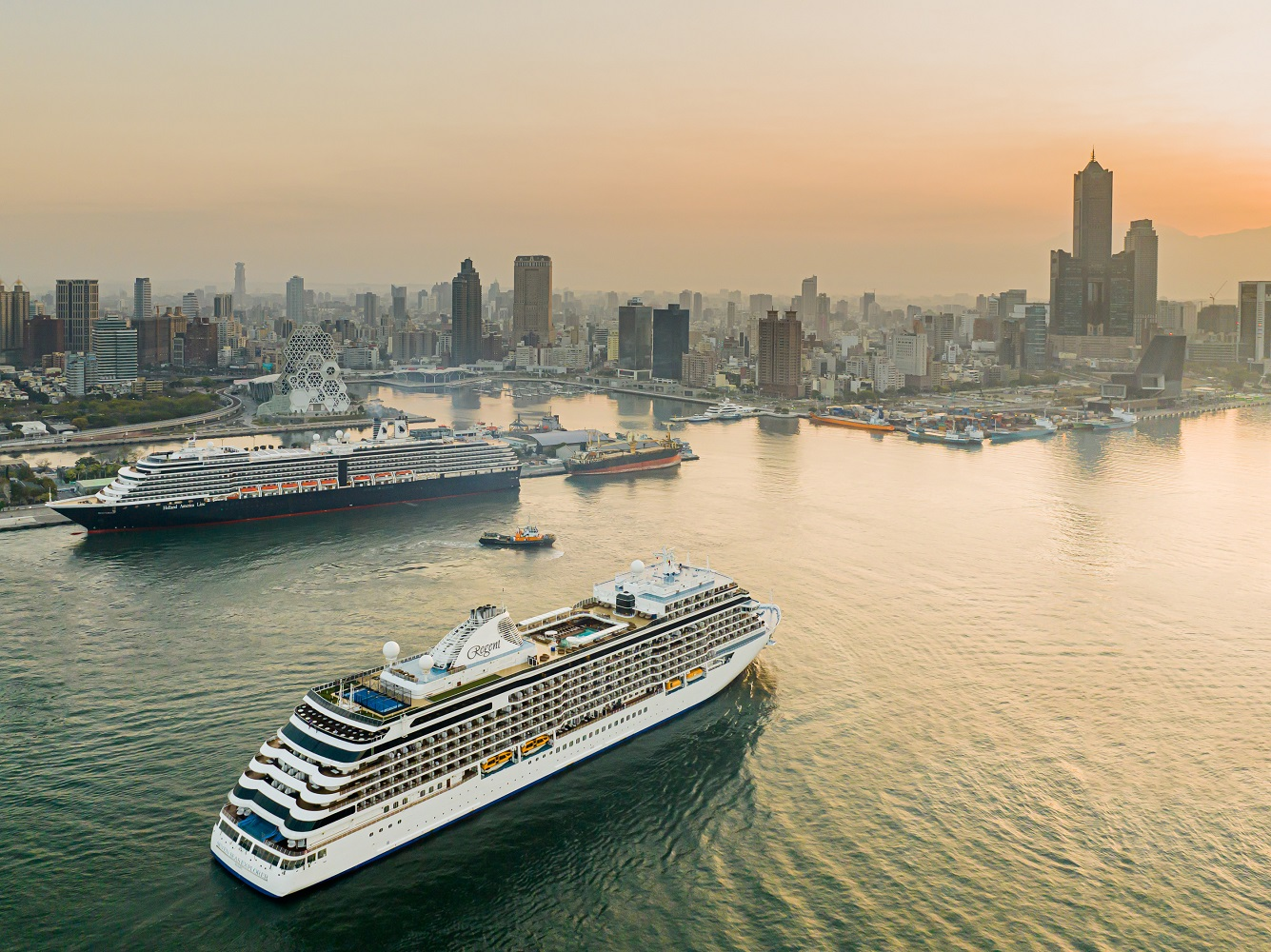
Westerdam at Kaohsiung, Taiwan in 2023

Westerdam was christened on 25 April 2004 in Venice, Italy by Dutch actress Renée Soutendijk. As with all Vista-class ships, Westerdam is equipped with a CODAG power plant and an Azipod propulsion system. The theme of her art collection is Dutch heritage in the New World. Paintings of historic Dutch ships, such as Henry Hudson's Halve Maen (Half Moon), and various sculptures and statues are displayed throughout the ship. Contemporary pieces include an original Andy Warhol portrait and sculptures by Sedona artist Susanna Holt. In an April 2007 refit 34 cabins were added as well as modifications to several public areas of the ship.

On 10 May 2011 while maneuvering through Yakutat Bay, south of Kluane National Park, British Columbia, Westerdam struck ice and incurred hull damage 15 feet (4.6 m) below the waterline.

On 28 June 2014, Westerdam suffered a boiler room fire after leaving the Port of Seattle. There were 2,086 passengers and 798 crew members on board, with no reported injuries. She returned to Seattle and was cleared the next day by the United States Coast Guard to return to sea.

On 25 June 2015, a Promech Air de Havilland Canada DHC-3 Otter carrying a pilot and eight passengers from Westerdam on a Holland America Line sightseeing excursion over southeastern Alaska crashed into the face of a granite cliff near Ella Lake, 20 miles (32 km) northeast of Ketchikan, killing all nine people on board.

=== COVID-19 pandemic ===
In February 2020, the cruise ship, departing after a stop in Hong Kong on 1 February, was denied to call in the Philippines, Japan, and Guam over concerns regarding coronavirus SARS-CoV-2. After initially receiving approval on 10 February to let the passengers disembark in Thailand, as the ship was heading to Laem Chabang port near Bangkok, permission to dock was refused the next day. However, the ship was still maintaining its course to Bangkok and at around 10:30 am CET on 11 February, Westerdam sailed around the southern tip of Vietnam. According to Flip Knibbe, a Dutch passenger on the ship, all the passengers have had their temperatures checked a second time. Speaking to NOS on 11 February, Knibbe said "Dit schip is virusvrij": 'This ship is virus free'. Unlike the cruise ship Diamond Princess, which is located in the port of Yokohama in Japan, those on board are not in quarantine. Everyone can move freely, shops and restaurants are open and the entertainment program continues.

On 13 February, the ship was allowed to dock in Sihanoukville, Cambodia. On 15 February, Malaysia reported that an 83-year-old US citizen who disembarked Westerdam and flew into Malaysia on 14 February had tested positive for COVID-19. In a second test, requested both by the Holland America Line and Cambodian authorities, the woman tested positive again. Despite these findings, Cambodian Prime Minister Hun Sen visited the ship, discouraged use of masks, and encouraged the passengers to tour the city, sparking concerns that another spoke was being added to the contagion network.

On 19 February, the last 233 passengers of the Westerdam cruise were cleared to disembark after all tests to determine the infection of COVID-19 in the 781 passengers of Westerdam gave negative results; the 747 crew members remain on board pending a final decision from the owner Holland America Line.

It is thought that about 650 of the guests on board the ship were from the US, 270 from Canada, 130 from the UK, 100 from the Netherlands, 50 from Germany and several passengers from Australia. The crew consisted largely of Indonesians and Filipinos.

=== 2021–present ===
In February 2026, the ship was affected by a norovirus outbreak during a cruise from Yokohama, Japan to Hong Kong. The Centre for Health Protection temporarily quarantined the ship in Hong Kong before allowing it to proceed.

== Past Westerdam ships ==
The first Westerdam sailed for Holland America Line from 1946 to 1965. It was a combined cargo/passenger ship with accommodations for 143 first-class passengers. While being constructed during World War II, this ship was sunk three times before making its maiden voyage. It was bombed and sunk by Allied forces on 27 August 1942 in the shipyard in Rotterdam. The Germans raised the ship in September 1944, but it was quickly sunk by the Dutch underground forces. After being raised a second time, the resistance again sank it on 17 January 1945. The ship was finally completed and operated on the transatlantic run making two eight-day crossings each month between Rotterdam and New York. She ended her career on 4 February 1965 when she was sold to Spain as scrap.

The second Westerdam began service as Homeric for Home Lines in 1986. Holland America Line acquired the ship in 1988 where the ship was lengthened in 1989 by 130 feet. After 643 cruises spanning over 13 years with Holland America, she was transferred to sister company, Costa Crociere in 2002, and renamed Costa Europa. Since then, she has been placed on a ten-year lease to Thomson Cruises, active as of April 2010, and renamed once more as Thomson Dream.
