= MS Nieuw Amsterdam (2009) =

Cruise ship sailing for Holland America Line

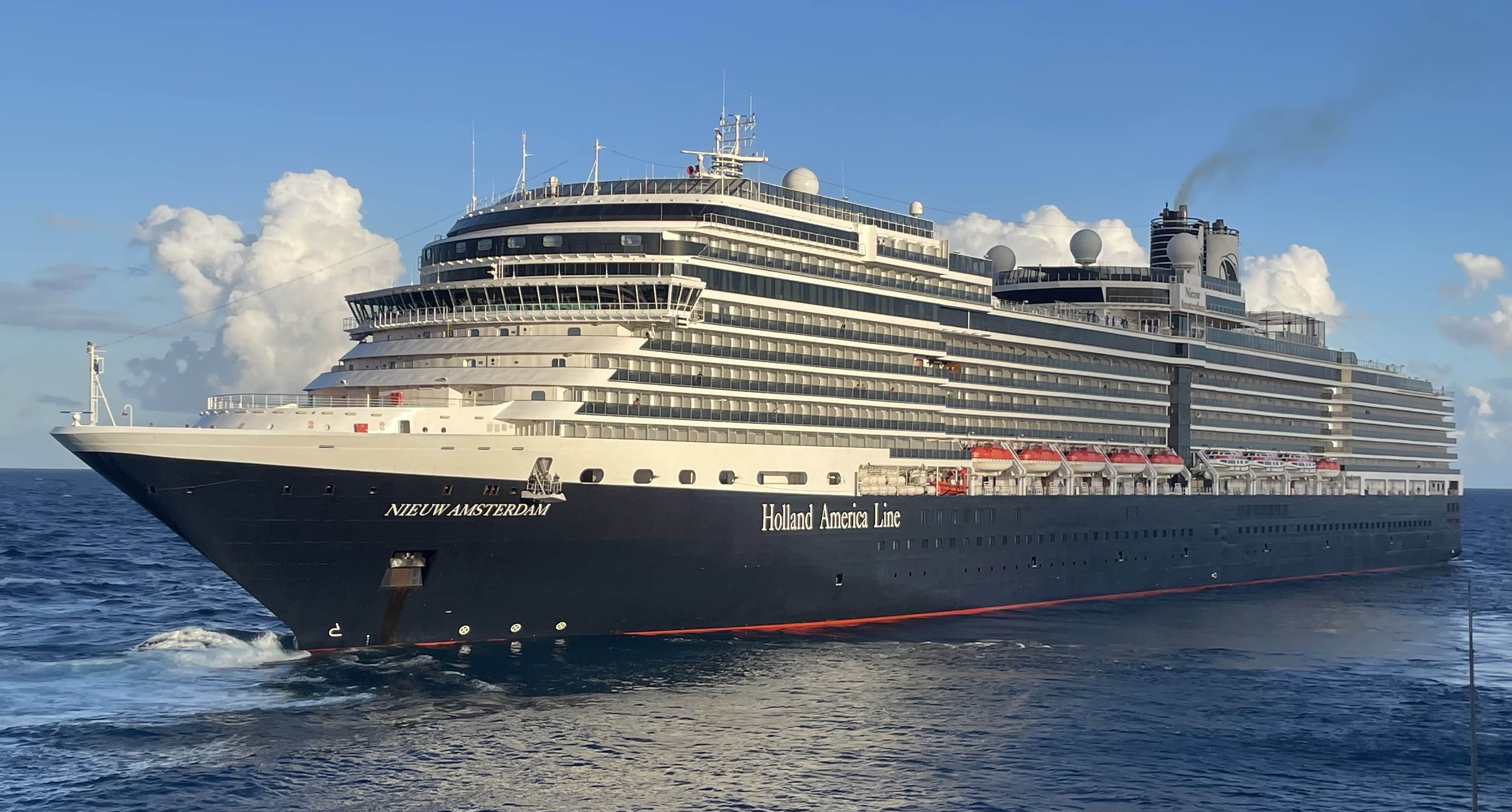
- MS Nieuw Amsterdam in Costa Maya.

History
- Name: Nieuw Amsterdam
- Owner: Carnival Corporation & plc
- Operator: Holland America Line
- Port of registry: Netherlands, Rotterdam
- Builder: Fincantieri; Marghera, Italy
- Cost: US$425 million
- Yard number: 6181
- Laid down: 15 July 2008
- Launched: 30 October 2009
- Christened: 4 July 2010
- In service: 5 July 2010
- Identification: Call sign PBWQ; IMO number: 9378450; MMSI number: 246648000
- Status: In service

General characteristics
- Class & type: Signature-class cruise ship
- Tonnage: 86,700 GT
- Length: 285.3 m (936 ft)
- Beam: 32.3 m (106 ft)
- Draught: 7.9 m (26 ft)
- Decks: 11 passenger decks
- Installed power: 64 MW MaK M43C diesel-electric
- Propulsion: Azipod
- Speed: 23.9 knots (44.3 km/h; 27.5 mph) max; 21.8 knots (40.4 km/h; 25.1 mph) (service)
- Capacity: 2,106
- Crew: 929

MS Nieuw Amsterdam is a Signature-class cruise ship sailing for Holland America Line. The 81st ship to enter Holland America's fleet, she is the fourth ship to bear the name Nieuw Amsterdam in the line's history.

== Service history ==
Nieuw Amsterdam was laid down on 15 July 2008, launched on 30 October 2009 and completed on 30 June 2010.

The ship was christened by Princess Maxima of the Netherlands in Venice, Italy on 4 July 2010 before embarking on its maiden voyage from Venice on 5 July 2010.

On 10 October 2017, Nieuw Amsterdam was driven ashore at Santa Cruz Huatulco, Mexico. Strong winds blew her from her mooring, snapping her lines. She was freed and returned to her berth, but required an extra night of examination for hull damage. She was cleared to sail safely the next day.

On 4 May 2019, Nieuw Amsterdam was struck by fleet-mate MS Oosterdam while docking stern-to-stern in Vancouver, British Columbia. No injuries were reported, and disembarkation on both ships proceeded as usual.

On 15 May 2020, Nieuw Amsterdam aided a sailing vessel in distress in waters off of Cape Town, South Africa. The vessel had lost its mast and was in need of fuel, and Nieuw Amsterdam was directed to its aid by the Cape Town Maritime Rescue Coordination Centre. Following a successful rendezvous, she continued on to Jakarta, Indonesia on a crew repatriation effort due to the COVID-19 pandemic.

On 24 March 2024, while on a cruise from Fort Lauderdale, Florida, Nieuw Amsterdam suffered a steam release in an engineering space. Two crew members died and Carnival Cruises is investigating the incident.

== Mechanics ==
Nieuw Amsterdam has dynamic positioning abilities, and is powered by six diesel generators and propelled by Azipod propulsion technology .

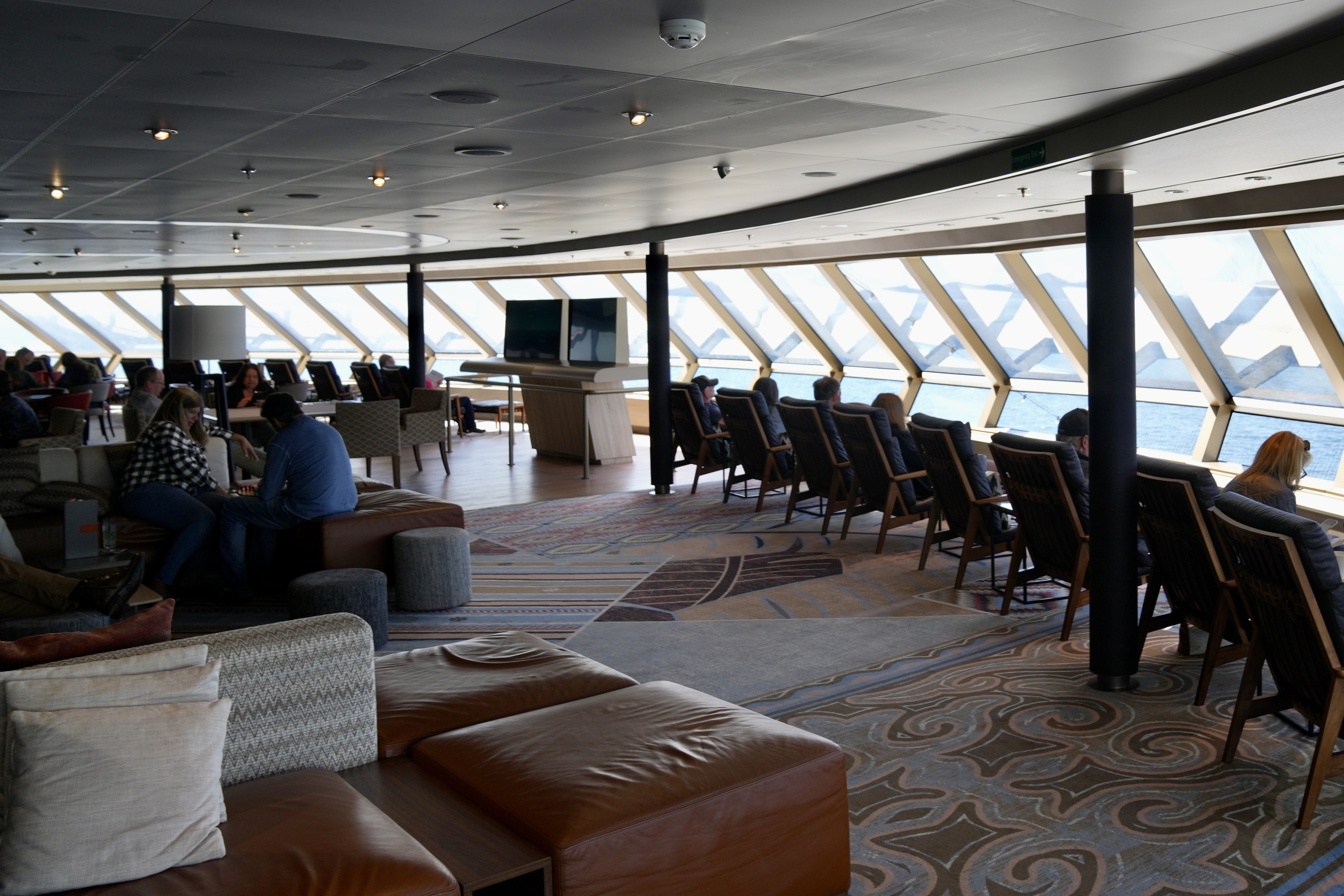
The forward observation lounge on deck eleven of Nieuw Amsterdam

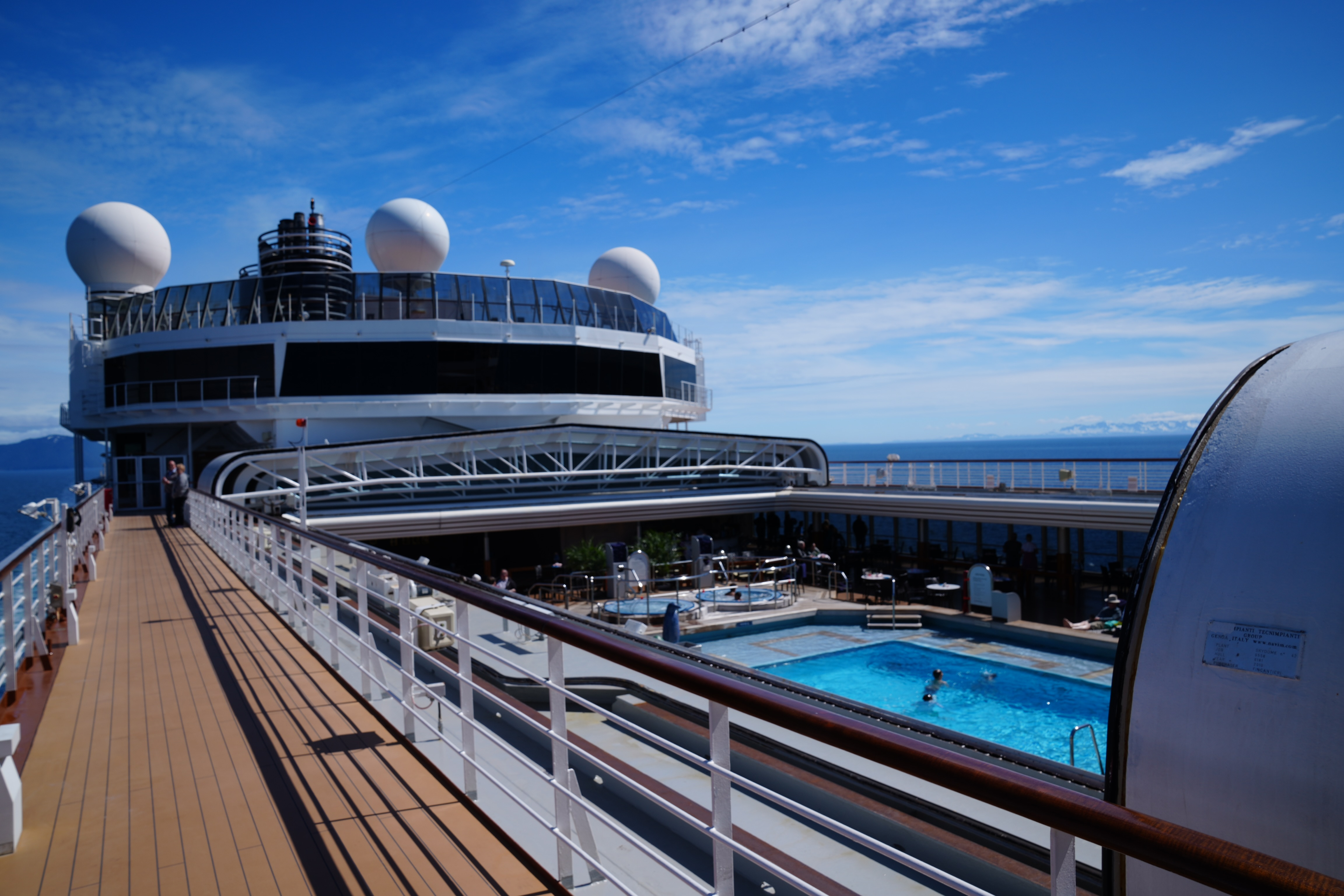
Nieuw Amsterdam with its retractable pool cover open

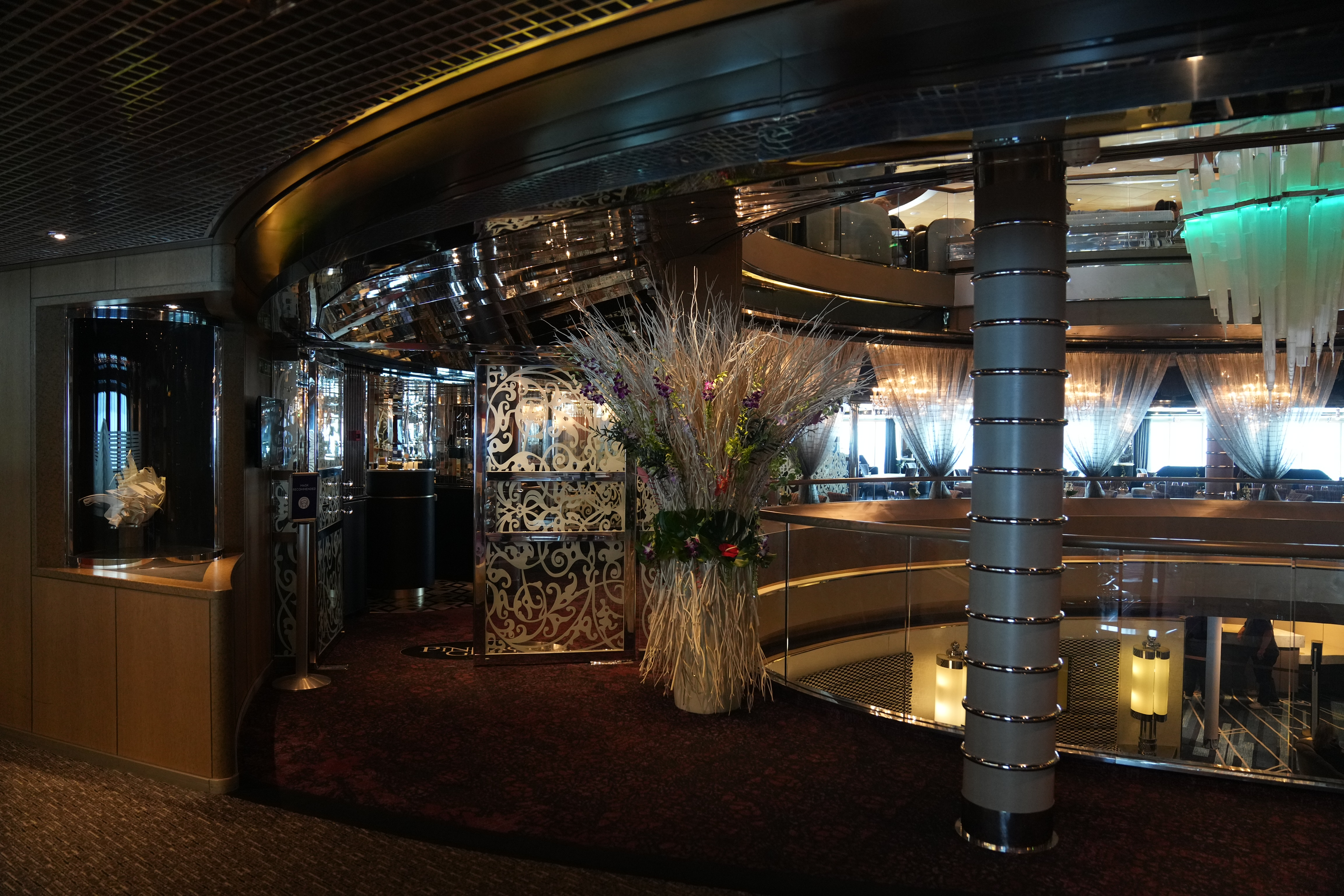
The Pinnacle Grill, specializing in steak and seafood aboard Nieuw Amsterdam
