= MS Queen Victoria =

Vista-class cruise ship

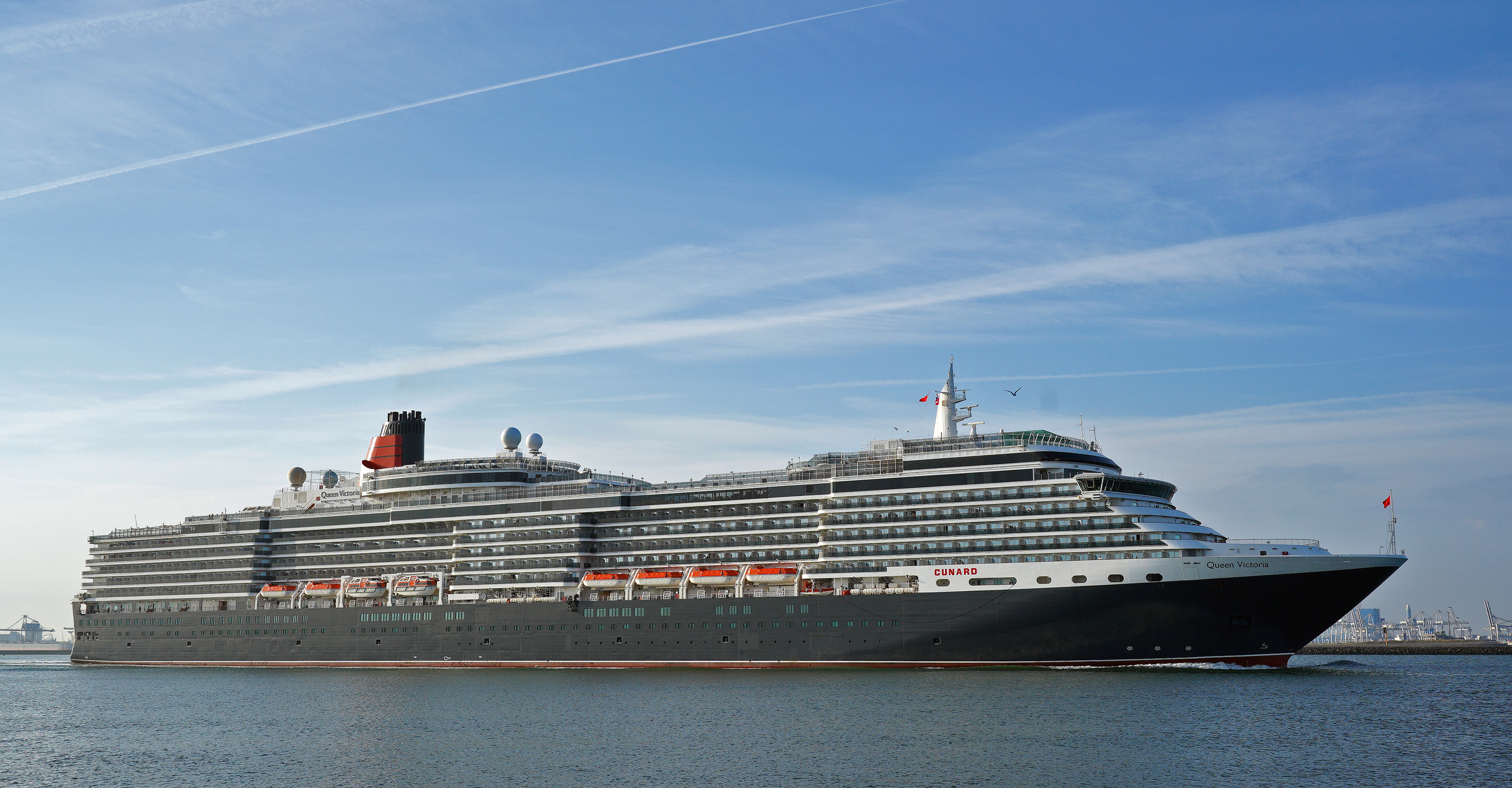
- Queen Victoria near Hook of Holland on 30 August 2022

History

Bermuda
- Name: Queen Victoria
- Namesake: Queen Victoria of the United Kingdom
- Owner: Carnival Corporation & plc
- Operator: Cunard Line
- Port of registry: (United Kingdom) Southampton, U.K. (2007–2011); Hamilton, Bermuda (2011–present)
- Route: Various
- Ordered: 3 December 2004
- Builder: Fincantieri Marghera shipyard, Italy
- Cost: £270 million (approx.)
- Laid down: 12 May 2006
- Launched: 15 January 2007 (float-out)
- Christened: 10 December 2007
- Completed: 2007
- Acquired: 2007
- Maiden voyage: 11 December 2007
- In service: 2007–present
- Identification: Call sign ZCEF3; IMO number: 9320556; MMSI number: 310624000
- Status: In service

General characteristics
- Class & type: Vista-class cruise ship
- Tonnage: 90,049 GT
- Length: 964.5 ft (294 m)
- Beam: 106 ft (32.3 m) waterline, 120 ft (36.6 m) extreme (bridge wings)
- Height: 205 ft (62.5 m) keel to funnel
- Draft: 26.2 ft (8.0 m)
- Decks: 16 total, 12 passenger
- Installed power: Sulzer ZA40 diesel engines; 63,400 kW (85,000 hp) (combined)
- Propulsion: Two ABB Azipods (2 × 16.7 MW)
- Speed: 23.7 knots (43.9 km/h; 27.3 mph) maximum, Service speed 18 knots (33 km/h; 21 mph)
- Capacity: 2,081 passengers
- Crew: 900

MS Queen Victoria (QV) is a Vista-class cruise ship operated by the Cunard Line and is named after the former British monarch Queen Victoria. The vessel is of the same basic design as other Vista-class cruise ships, including Queen Elizabeth. At 90,049 gross tonnage (GT) she is the smallest of Cunard's ships in operation.

== Characteristics and naming ==
Unlike many previous Cunard ships, Queen Victoria is not a traditional ocean liner, as she does not have heavy plating throughout the hull. However, the bow was constructed with heavier plating to cope with the transatlantic run, and the ship has a high freeboard. The Queen Mary 2 had cost approximately $300,000 US per berth, nearly double that of many contemporary cruise ships, so Cunard made the economic decision to base Queen Victoria on a modified Vista-class cruise ship, and Queen Elizabeth retains the same design with some minor changes. Nonetheless, Ian McNaught, who was Queen Victoria's captain in 2009, has asserted that the ship is a liner based on her classic décor.

== History ==
=== Concept and construction ===
An order for a Vista-class vessel was transferred by Carnival Corporation & plc, parent company to Holland America, Cunard and P&O from its Holland America Line to Cunard with the intent that the vessel would become the Queen Victoria Fincantieri laid down the keel in 2003, but Carnival reassigned the hull again to become the P&O ship Arcadia.

The new Queen Victoria ordered from Fincantieri in 2004 was 11 metres (36 ft 1 in) longer, 5,000 tons larger, with an increased passenger capacity of 2,000. and features which had proved successful on Queen Mary 2. The keel was laid on 12 May 2006. Eighty prefabricated steel "blocks", each complete with interior structure, cabling, and ducts, and each weighing 325 tons, were then added. The completed hull with superstructure was floated out on 15 January 2007, after having a bottle of Prosecco smashed against her side by Maureen Ryan, a Cunard employee who has served on all four "Cunard Queens". The ceremony also saw the traditional placing of coins on the mast – in this case a Euro and a gold Queen Victoria sovereign were welded beneath the radar mast.

Queen Victoria departed the Port of Venice on 24 August 2007 to commence her sea trials, and, after handover to Cunard, arrived in Southampton, United Kingdom, to fanfare and media attention on 7 December; much of the coverage was focused on the ship's superlatives, and represented Queen Victoria as "Cunard's most luxurious ship". The same day, the ship was officially named by Camilla, Duchess of Cornwall, continuing the tradition of Cunard "Queens" being named by royalty. The bottle of champagne failed to break upon impact with Queen Victoria's hull, which according to nautical superstition is a bad omen. However, a backup bottle was immediately successful.

=== Service history ===
Captain Paul Wright was appointed as the first master of Queen Victoria in October 2006. Captain Christopher Rynd became secondary master. Captain Ian McNaught briefly commanded Queen Victoria before transferring to Seabourn.

Queen Victoria undertook her maiden voyage, a 10-day cruise to northern Europe, on 11 December 2007. Following this and a cruise to the Canary Islands, Queen Victoria embarked on her first world cruise, circumnavigating the globe in 107 days. (The first ship to have previously done so—also named Victoria—took 1,153 days in 1519 to 1522.) The first leg of this voyage was a tandem crossing of the Atlantic with Queen Elizabeth 2, to New York City, where the two ships met Queen Mary 2 near the Statue of Liberty on 13 January 2008, with a celebratory fireworks display, marking the first time three Cunard "Queens" had been present in the same location. Cunard declared that this would also be the only time the three ships would ever meet, owing to the QE2's impending retirement from service in late 2008, though the ships did meet again in Southampton on 22 April 2008, resulting from a change in Queen Elizabeth 2's schedule.

In May 2008, Queen Victoria struck a pier in Malta after her thrusters malfunctioned. However the damage was minimal, allowing the ship to continue operating, but repairs resulted in her missing a port of call in La Goulette.

Queen Victoria completed her third world cruise in 2010 when she was joined by Captain Chris Wells, who was aboard to familiarise himself with the Vista-class ship before taking command of Queen Elizabeth in late 2010. During a call at Sydney, Queen Victoria was illuminated in pink in support of breast cancer research. On 9 December 2010 Cunard announced its first female captain, Faroese-born Inger Klein Olsen, who took command of Queen Victoria on 15 December.

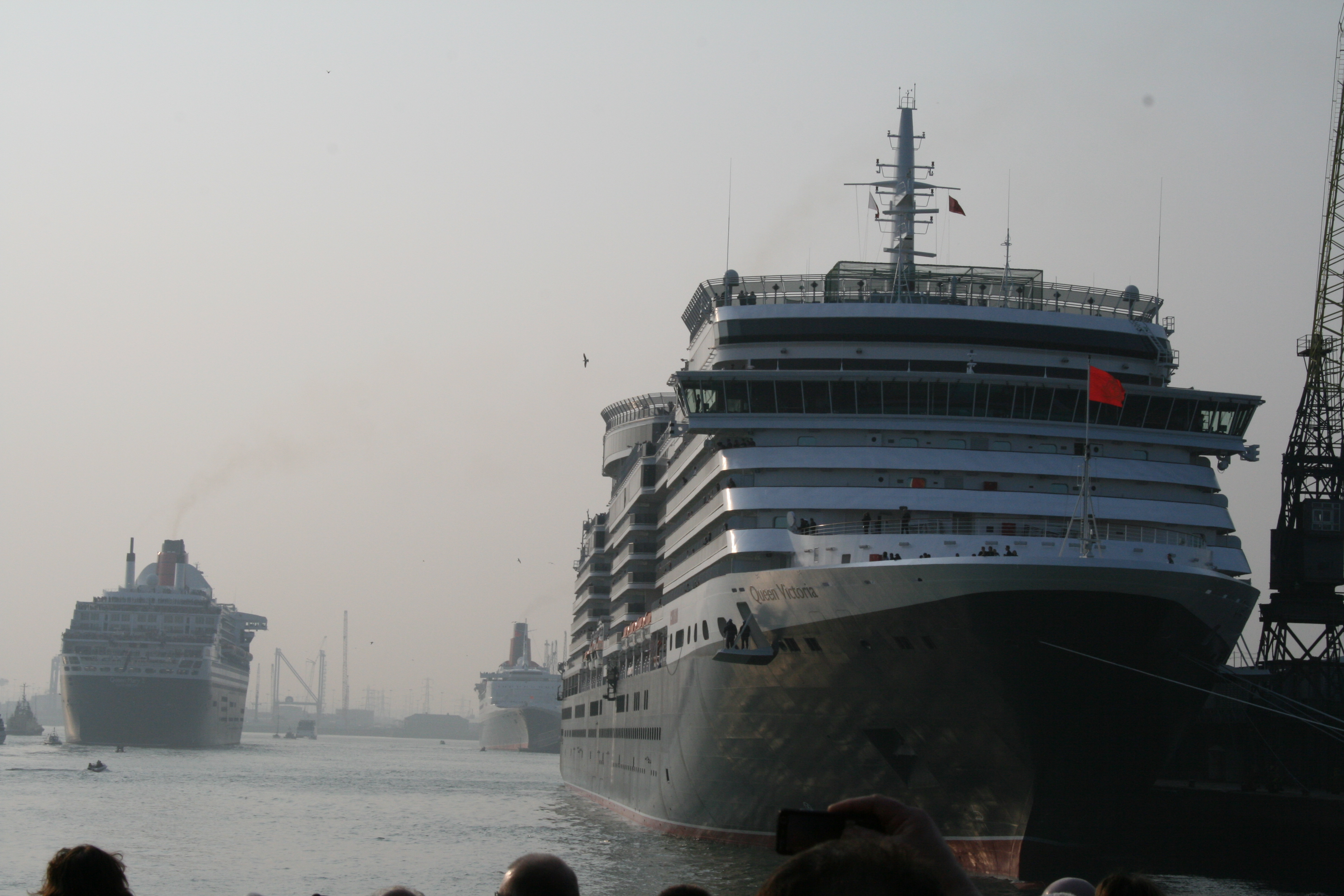
Queen Victoria in her home port; Queen Elizabeth 2 is astern, and Queen Mary 2 is passing them

At the end of October 2011 Queen Victoria and her fleet mates changed their registries to Hamilton, Bermuda, to host weddings on board. Also the word "Southampton" across the stern was replaced by Hamilton.

=== Cunard rendezvous ===
In January 2011, two years after the first Cunard Royal Rendezvous, on the same date, Queen Mary 2 met up with both Queen Victoria and Queen Elizabeth for another Royal Rendezvous in New York City on 13 January 2011. Both the Queen Victoria and Queen Elizabeth made a tandem crossing of the Atlantic for the event. All three ships met in front of the Statue of Liberty at 6:45 pm for a Grucci fireworks display. The Empire State Building was lit up in red to mark the event. In March 2011 Queen Victoria passed the former Cunard retired ocean liner Queen Mary for the first time. The Queen Mary is permanently docked in Long Beach, California and operated as a hotel.

On 5 June 2012 all three Queens met again but this time in Southampton to celebrate the Diamond Jubilee of Queen Elizabeth II.

On 6 May 2014 all three Queens met up for the first time in Lisbon, Portugal, in preparation for Queen Mary 2's 10th birthday. All three on departure sailed in a one-line formation to Southampton. On 9 May both Queen Elizabeth and Queen Victoria led in single file, Queen Mary 2 up the Southampton channel, with both ships docking in a bow to bow formation performing a birthday salute to Queen Mary 2. Later on, all three sisters gather for a fireworks display in which Queen Mary 2 led the vessels back down the channel.

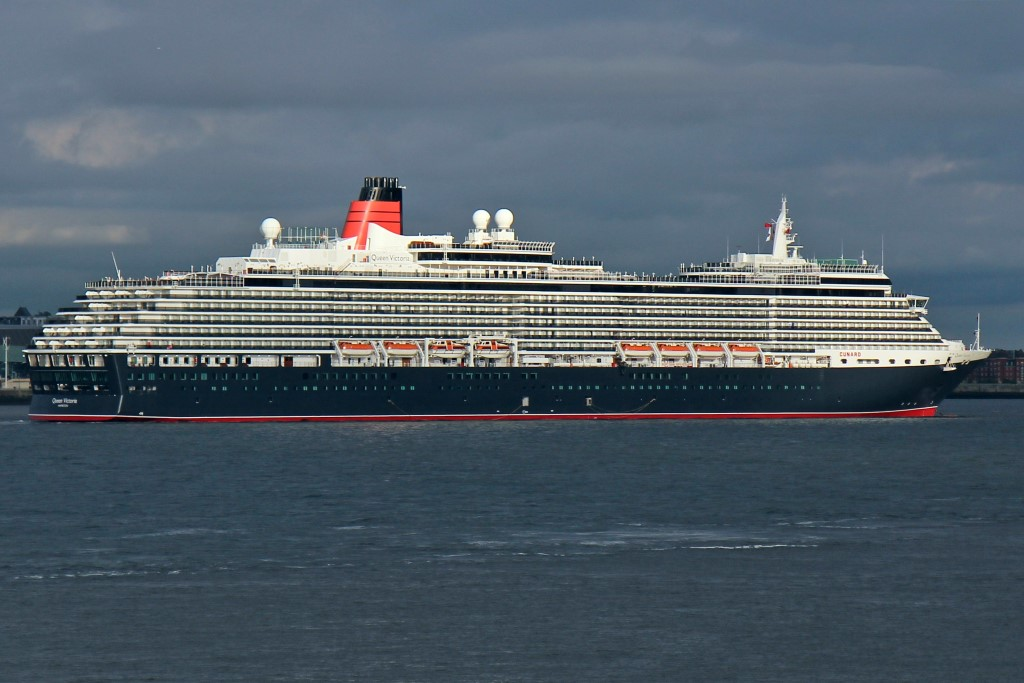
Queen Victoria at anchor in the River Mersey, on 25 May 2015, after the Cunard 175 celebration

On 25 May 2015 the three "Queens" were at Liverpool celebrating 175 years of the formation of the Cunard Line, which was formed and based in the city. At low tide, the three ships stopped in line in the middle of the River Mersey, bow to stern, maneuvered 180 degrees in full synchronisation with each other, which was described as a river dance, and then formed an arrow side by side. Queen Mary 2 was in the centre with her bow in line with the Cunard Building at the Pier Head. The Royal Air Force Red Arrows aerobatics team performed a flypast in Vic formation, emitting red, white and blue smoke, over the vessels. An estimated 1.3 million people lined the river banks to witness the spectacle.

== Design ==
=== Exterior ===
Queen Victoria's exterior design closely resembles that of Vista-class ships built for various cruise companies.

A feature which distinguishes her from her younger fleet mate, Queen Elizabeth, is the more angled sloping stern, as compared to the newer ship's vertical one. In addition to this she lacks the covered games deck above the bridge, a feature which is present on the Queen Elizabeth.

=== Interior ===
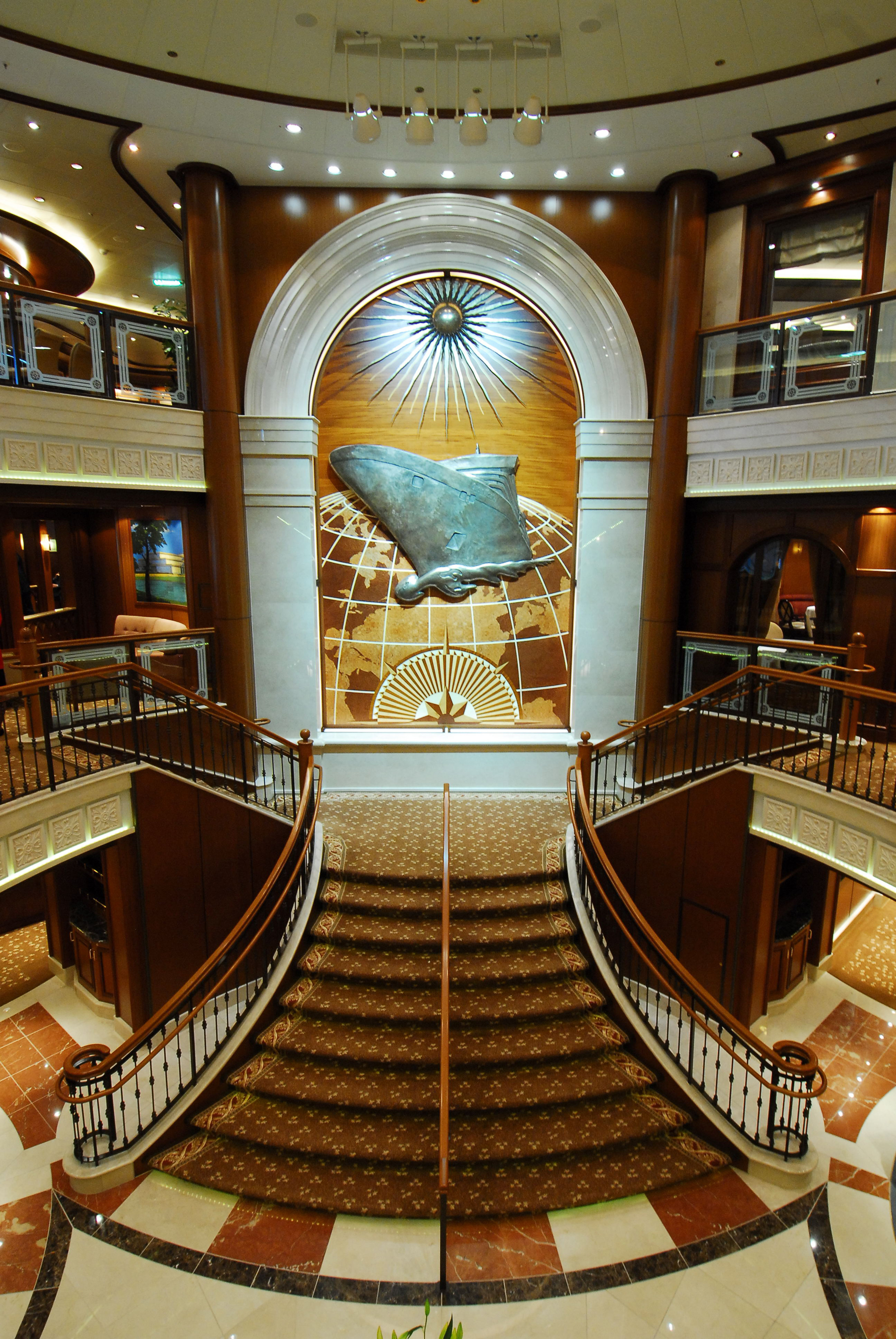
John McKenna's relief sculpture panel on the grand lobby staircase

Queen Victoria's public rooms are mainly located on the lower-level public decks of the ship, 2 Deck and 3 Deck. Unlike Queen Mary 2, however, there is no central circulation access, the main corridors being to the port side. The ship does have the similar grand lobby staircase with an artwork feature as on the Queen Mary ships, a relief portrait of the ship situated on the staircase sculpted by British sculptor John McKenna.

1 Deck, the lowest passenger deck, holds the lowest level of a three-storey stairwell lobby, as well as of the Royal Court Theatre. On 2 Deck can be found the mid-level of the Royal Court Theatre, casino, Golden Lion Pub, Queen's Room, Verandah à la carte restaurant, Chart Room bar, and lower level of both the library and Britannia Restaurant. The topmost level of the theatre, Royal Arcade, Midships Lounge, and upper level of the library and formal dining room are all on 3 Deck, along with a wrap-around exterior promenade. The decks above these contain mostly passenger cabins until 9 Deck, on which are the Cunard Health Club and spa, Winter Garden lounge, Lido Restaurant, and two outdoor pools. On 10 Deck is the Commodore Club, Churchill Lounge (for smokers) and Yacht Club nightclub. The Queen's Grill and Princess Grill, with their attached lounge and an open courtyard between, are on 11 Deck.

The Queen Victoria operates similarly to both the Queen Mary 2 and the former Queen Elizabeth 2, both of which follow the same practice of separating passengers into different restaurants based on the price of the cabin they booked (the Britannia as standard for regular cabins, the Princess Grill as middle for those in junior suites, and the Queen's Grill as superior for deluxe suite occupants), are actually ships divided into three classes, despite the fact that all other public rooms are used by all passengers equally. Though this situation is similar on Queen Elizabeth 2 and Queen Mary 2, it is further enhanced on Queen Victoria by the fact that Grill Passengers (those dining in the Princess Grill or Queen's Grill) also have two private outdoor areas on 10 and 11 Decks with the specific name "Grills Terrace", a feature which also appears on Queen Mary 2 at the aft section of 10 Deck.

Queen Victoria's theatre is the first at sea to have private boxes. There is also has a Winter Garden lounge with a retractable glass roof and a two-story library with a connecting spiral staircase.

==== May 2017 refit ====
In May 2017, Queen Victoria underwent a second major overhaul, which added new cabins aft, as well as refurbishing other spaces and adding new dining facilities. The modifications saw the passenger capacity increase to 1,988 from 2,081.

Changes included a new Britannia Club restaurant, updated Chartroom, refreshed Winter Garden, refreshed Yacht Club and new outdoor pool area.

== Technical ==
=== Power plant and propulsion system ===
Queen Victoria can carry 3,000 tons of heavy fuel and 150 tons of marine gas oil, consuming 12 tons per hour for maximum output. Although the ship burns heavy fuel, it uses low-sulphur fuel in certain jurisdictions.

== Incidents ==
On Queen Victoria's 21 December 2007 voyage, 122 guests and 11 crew on board contracted norovirus. It was officially attributed to a guest who had already contracted the virus prior to boarding the ship. The outbreak was also popularly attributed to the Duchess of Cornwall's initial failure to break the champagne bottle during the ship's christening, which is a bad omen in naval tradition. While most recovered, 30 were still reported to be ill at that time.

This was not reported on the CDC's website, which recorded three more norovirus outbreaks on the ship's 4 January 2010, 12 January 2010, and 21 February 2018 voyages.

On 14 May 2008, on Queen Victoria's first visit to Grand Harbour, Valletta, Malta, the throttles malfunctioned during berthing, resulting in the vessel colliding with the pier. She remained in port for an extra night whilst repairs were carried out to the stern.

On 27 April 2022, the passenger ferry European Causeway suffered a complete power loss just off the coast of Larne, Northern Ireland The Royal National Lifeboat Institution dispatched three lifeboats to the vessel's location, a coastguard helicopter was dispatched and the Queen Victoria was asked to stand by to assist if required. European Causeway recovered power after roughly two hours adrift and continued the voyage to Larne under her own power, escorted by the lifeboats, while Queen Victoria continued on her way.
