= Edam =

Edam may refer to:

- Edam cheese
- Edam, Netherlands, a town in Edam-Volendam, after which the cheese is named
- Edam-Volendam, Dutch municipality that includes towns of Edam and Volendam
- Edam, Saskatchewan, a village in Canada
- Evernote Data Access and Management (EDAM), a protocol for exchanging Evernote data with the Evernote service
- SS Edam, the name of several Holland America Line vessels
- Extended Day Ahead Market (EDAM), a near-term energy trading market proposed by California Independent System Operator (CAISO)
