= Aegean Majesty =

Cruise ship

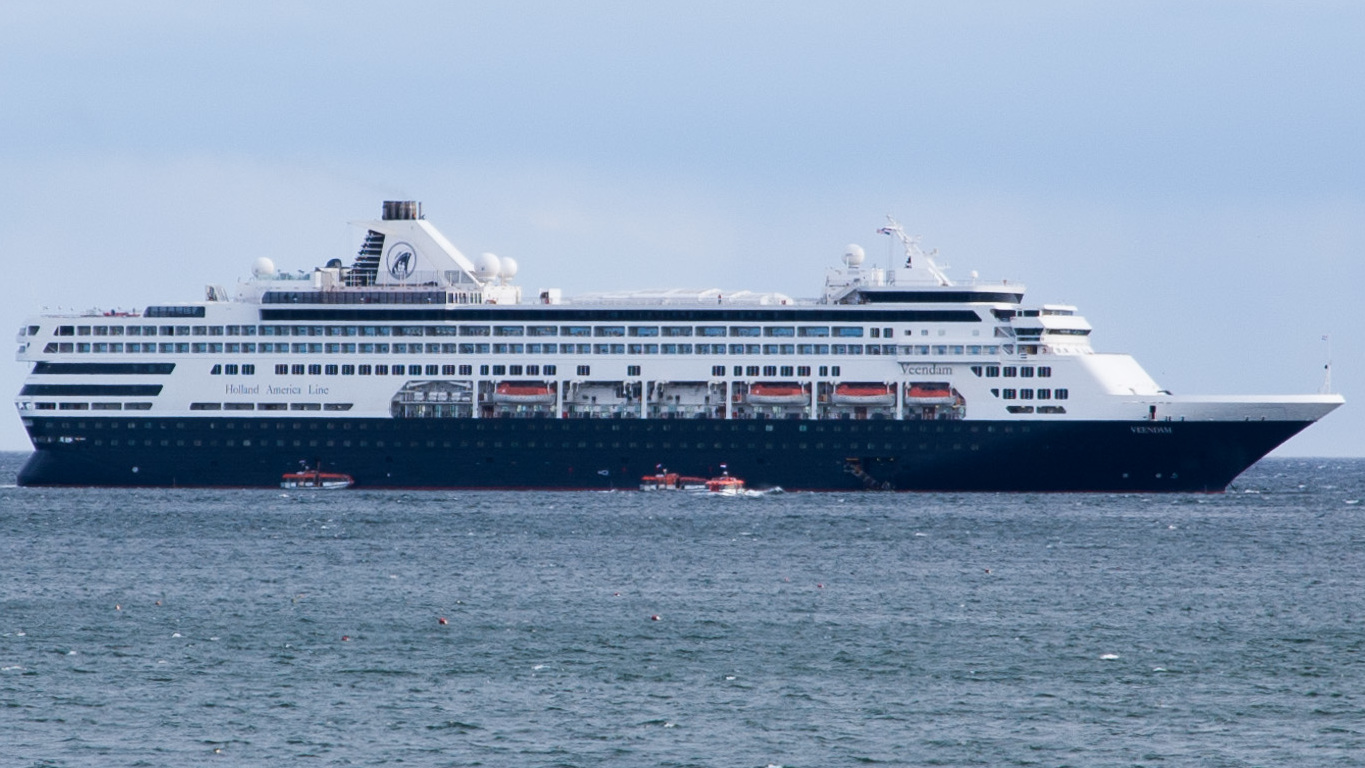
- Veendam sailing outside Gloucester, Massachusetts

History
- Name: Veendam (1996–2020); Aegean Majesty (2020–2026); Victoria Majestic (2022–present); Legacy (2026–present)
- Namesake: Veendam
- Owner: Wind Surf Ltd, Bahamas (1996–2006); HAL Nederland NV, Netherlands (2006–2020); Seajets (2020–present)
- Operator: Holland America Line (1996–2020)
- Port of registry: (The Bahamas) Nassau, Bahamas (1996–2006); Netherlands, Rotterdam (2006–2020); Hamilton, Bermuda (2020–present)
- Builder: Fincantieri, Monfalcone, Italy
- Yard number: 5954
- Laid down: 20 September 1994
- Launched: 24 June 1995
- Completed: 1996
- Maiden voyage: 1996
- In service: 1996
- Out of service: 2020
- Refit: 2016
- Identification: IMO number: 9102992; MMSI number: 310801000 (from 2020); Callsign: ZCEZ7 (from 2020)
- Status: Laid up in Aigio, Greece, since 2020

General characteristics
- Class & type: Statendam-class cruise ship
- Tonnage: 55,451 GT (as built); 57,092 GT (from 2006)
- Length: 219 m (719 ft)
- Beam: 31 m (101 ft)
- Decks: 13
- Installed power: 2 × 12-cylinder 8,640 kW, 3 × 8-cylinder 5,760 kW diesel generators
- Speed: 20.9 knots (38.7 km/h; 24.1 mph)
- Capacity: 1,350 passengers
- Crew: 568

MS Veendam is a cruise ship operated by Holland America Line from 1996 to 2020 and named after the municipality of Veendam in the Netherlands. In 2020, during the COVID-19 pandemic, the vessel was sold to Seajets, Greece, renamed Aegean Majesty, and has remained laid up. As of September 2026 the ship is for sale for US$35 million.

== Service history ==
Veendam was the fourth Statendam-class ship, ordered following the success of her three sister ships. Her keel was laid by Fincantieri as hull number 5954 in 1994. The ship was launched on 24 June 1995 and completed in May 1996. Actress Debbie Reynolds became the ship's godmother, and sailed on her maiden voyage on 15 May 1996. The ship was the fourth Holland America Line ship to be named after the town of Veendam, Netherlands. Her registered owner was Wind Surf Ltd, and she was registered at Nassau, Bahamas.

Veendam was transferred to the Netherlands flag in 2006 and to the ownership of HAL Nederland NV of Rotterdam, continuing under Holland America operation. In April 2009, the ship underwent dry dock renovations at Grand Bahama Shipyard in Freeport, Grand Bahama, which included significant changes to her stern. Two new decks of verandah accommodation were added which necessitated the removal of a portion of her upper decks, and the bridge wings were extended. To structurally support the resulting change in weight, a ducktail was added to her hull.

During winter months Veendam operated from South American ports and, during the summer season, sailed from New York.

On 25 January 2015, Veendam was called by the United States Coast Guard to rescue a pilot who had ditched his plane after experiencing a mechanical failure 225 nautical miles (417 km; 259 mi) from the coast of Maui, Hawaii. Coordinating with the U.S. Coast Guard, Veendam launched a lifeboat in a successful rescue operation.

The ship was sold in July 2020, during the COVID-19 pandemic, to Greek ferry operator Seajets along with sister ship Maasdam. After delivery in Katakolon, Greece in August, Veendam was renamed Aegean Majesty by registered owner Mediterranean Dream Inc, reflagged from Netherlands to Bermuda, and berthed at Corinth. In the early morning of 7 November 2020, in strong winds, the ship broke its moorings in Corinth and grounded on a sandbank in the harbour. Two days later she was refloated, undamaged.

From 2022, the ship was advertised – under the name of Victoria Majestic – as a residential cruise ship operated by Victoria Cruises Line. Despite an initially advertised May 2023 departure date, no sailings have thus far taken place, and when contacted by the BBC, the firm that owns the ship denied any association.
