= SS W. A. Scholten =

Passenger ship built for the Holland-America Line

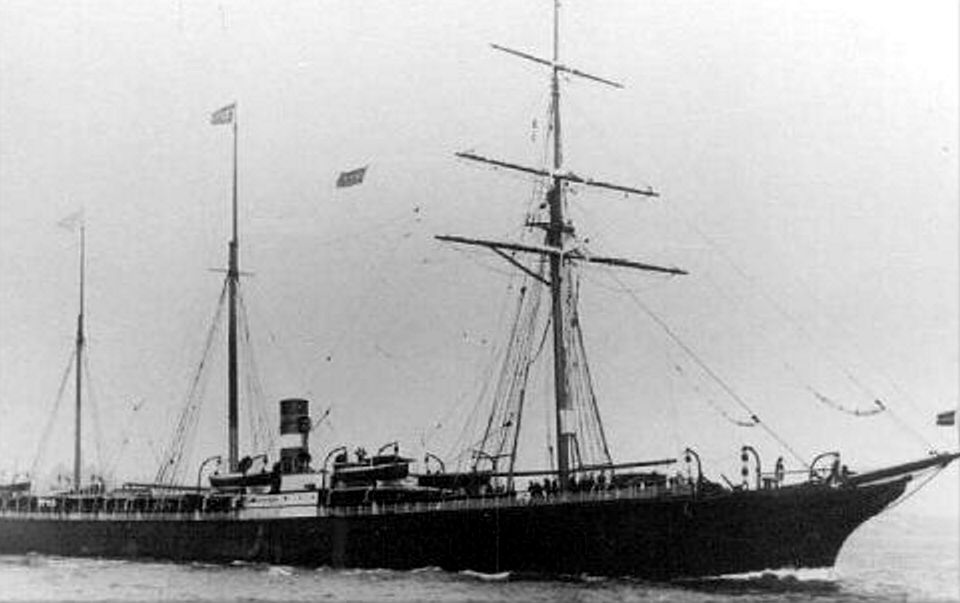
- The W. A. Scholten between 1874 and 1878

History
- Name: W.A. Scholten
- Operator: Holland-America Line
- Builder: Robert Napier & Sons, Glasgow
- Launched: 16 February 1874
- Fate: Sank after collision

General characteristics
- Type: Ocean Liner
- Tonnage: 2,589 grt (7,330 m^{3})
- Length: 112.16 m (368 ft 0 in)
- Beam: 11.58 m (38 ft 0 in)
- Draft: 8.68 m (28 ft 6 in)
- Installed power: 360 horsepower (270 kW)
- Propulsion: compound inverted engine, single shaft and screw
- Sail plan: 3 masts
- Speed: 11 knots (20 km/h; 13 mph) max
- Capacity: 24 First, 18 Second (After refit) and 500 Third Class

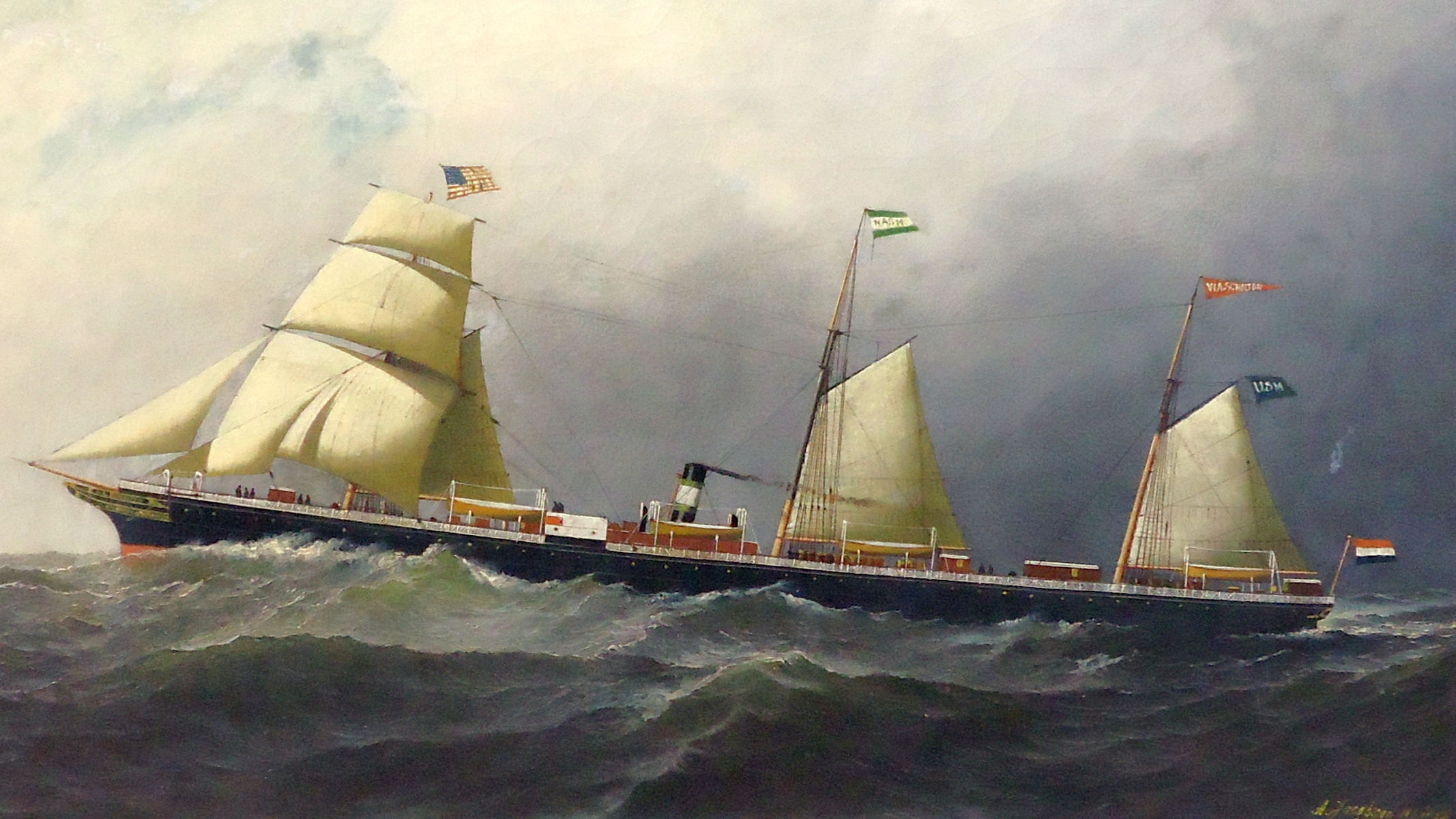
Drawing of the W. A. Scholten (1878)

SS W. A. Scholten was a passenger ship built for the Dutch shipping company Holland-America Line. Her launching took place on 16 February 1874, and the ship was handed over on April 11, 1874, which was used as an ocean liner on the North Atlantic and carried passengers, freight, and mail from Rotterdam to New York between 1874 and 1887. On 19 November 1887, the steamer sank after a ship collision in the English Channel, killing 132 people. The ship was named after Willem Albert Scholten, an industrialist from Groningen.

== History ==
The ship was built at Robert Napier & Sons shipyard of Glasgow and was launched on 16 February 1874. She and her sister ship the P. Caland were handed over to Nederlandsch-Amerikaansche Stoomvaart Maatschappij, better known as Holland America Line. On May 16, 1874, departed on her Ten-day long maiden voyage from Rotterdam to the New York route. She would continue this service until she departed on what would be her last voyage. On 18 November 1887, when she was struck by another ship, the Rosa Mary. The Scholten suffered severe damage with a 2.43 meters (7.9 ft) wide hole in her port bow. As the water flooded the ship, the captain ordered everyone to abandon the ship. She was sunk on 19 November 1887.
