= MS Marella Dream =

Cruise ship

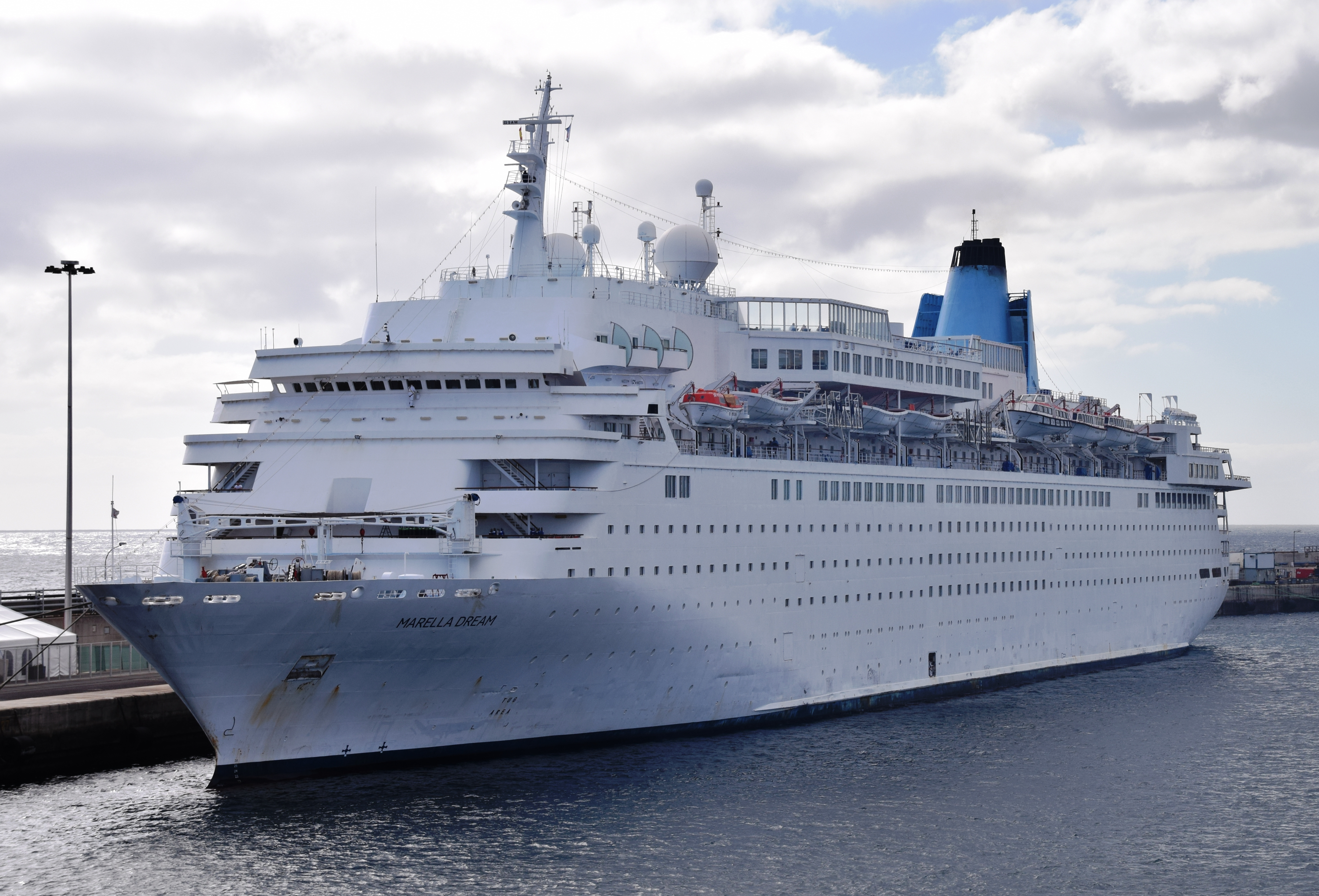
- Homeric as Marella Dream in 2019

History
- Name: 1986–1988: Homeric; 1988–2002: Westerdam; 2002–2010: Costa Europa; 2010–2017: Thomson Dream; 2017–2021: Marella Dream; 2021–2022: Ella
- Owner: 1986–1988: Home Lines; 1988–2002: Holland America Line; 2002–2010: Costa Crociere; 2010–2020: TUI UK Ltd.; 2020–2022: Rota Shipping, Turkey
- Operator: 1986–1988: Home Lines; 1988–2002: Holland America Line; 2002–2010: Costa Crociere; 2010–2017: Thomson Cruises; 2017–2020: Marella Cruises
- Port of registry: 1986–1988: Panama, Panama; 1988–1996: Nassau, Bahamas; 1996–2002: Rotterdam, Netherlands; 2002–2010: Genoa, Italy; 2010–2020: Valletta, Malta; 2020–2022: Moroni, Comoros
- Builder: Meyer Werft, Papenburg, West Germany
- Cost: $150 million
- Yard number: 610
- Launched: 28 September 1985
- Completed: 1986
- Acquired: 6 May 1986
- Maiden voyage: 1986
- In service: 1986
- Out of service: 2020
- Identification: IMO number: 8407735; DNV ID: G142990
- Fate: Scrapped at Aliağa, Turkey in 2022.
- Notes: Beached for scrap

General characteristics (as built)
- Type: cruise ship
- Tonnage: 42,092 GT; 5,157 DWT
- Length: 204 m (669 ft 3 in)
- Beam: 29.73 m (97 ft 6 in)
- Installed power: 2 × 10-cyl, B&W-MAN diesels; combined 23800 kW
- Propulsion: Two propellers
- Speed: 22.5 knots (41.7 km/h; 25.9 mph) service speed
- Capacity: 1,132 passengers

General characteristics (as Thomson Dream)
- Type: cruise ship
- Tonnage: 54,763 GT; 5,340 DWT
- Length: 243.2 m (798 ft)
- Beam: 29 m (95 ft 2 in) (waterline)/32 m (105 ft 0 in) (max)
- Draught: 7.214 m (23 ft 8.0 in)
- Decks: 12 (9 passenger accessible)
- Installed power: 4 × MaK 8M 453B diesel engines (2308 kW each); 1 × MaK 6M 453B diesel engines (1800 kW); 1 × Deutz BA12 M816 emergency generator (550 kW); 2 × B&W-MAN 10 L 55 GB propulsion engines (11,898 kW each)
- Propulsion: 2 × controllable pitch propellers; 3 × Wärtsilä CT175 G maneuvering thrusters (2 forward, 1 aft)
- Speed: 19 knots (35 km/h; 22 mph) service speed; 20 knots (37 km/h; 23 mph) maximum speed
- Capacity: 1,506 passengers
- Crew: 600

MS Marella Dream was a cruise ship built in 1986 at the Meyer Werft shipyard in Papenburg, West Germany as Homeric for Home Lines, and their last newbuild to remain in active service. In 1988 she was sold to Holland America Line, renamed Westerdam, and in 1990 lengthened by 36.9 m (121 ft 1 in) at Meyer Werft. In 2002 she was transferred to the fleet of Costa Cruises and renamed Costa Europa. In April 2010 she was taken on a ten-year charter by Thomson Cruises, under the name Thomson Dream.

Following the 2017 renaming of Thomson Cruises to Marella Cruises, TUI Group also changed the ship's name to Marella Dream. She was retired from Marella Cruises in November 2020 and was sold, then broken up in 2022.

== Concept and construction ==
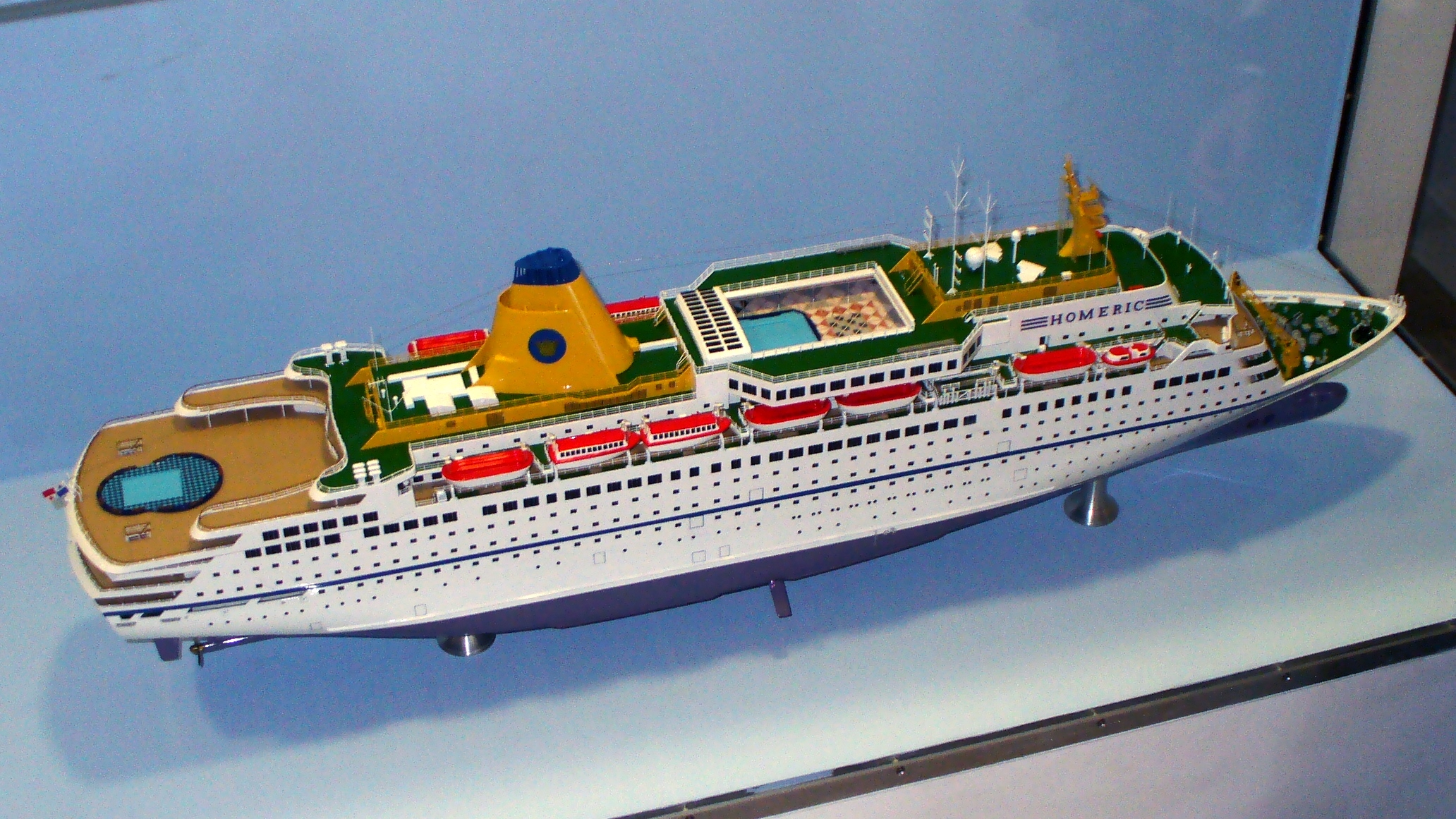
A model of the Homeric as built

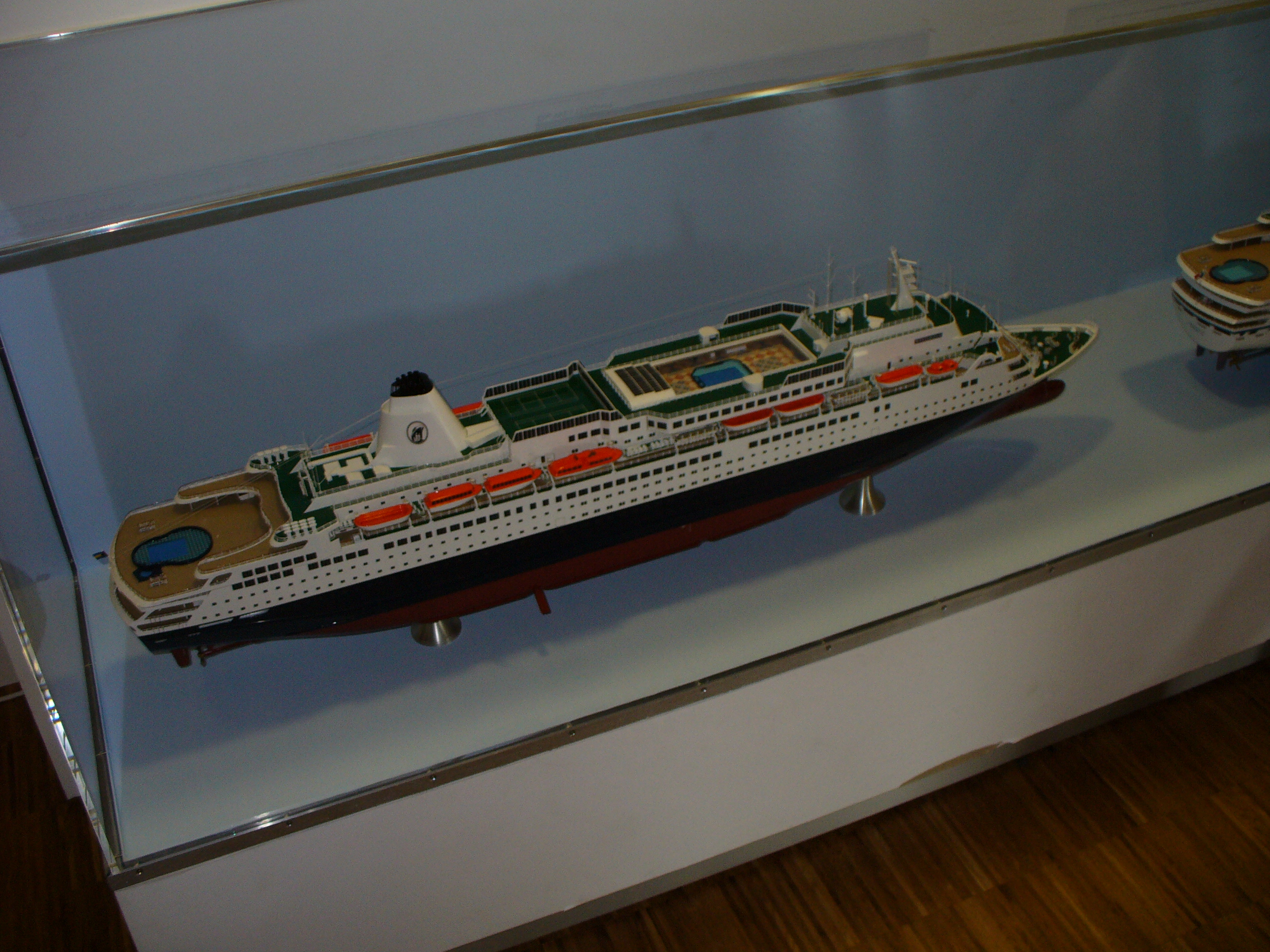
A model of the Westerdam as with Holland America Line

Home Lines planned Homeric during the first half of the 1980s as a replacement for their aging SS Oceanic. Meyer Werft in Papenburg, West Germany was chosen as the shipyard to build her. The ship was named in honour of the company's earlier SS Homeric, a popular ship that had been destroyed by a fire in 1973. The new Homeric was launched on 28 September 1985, and was the largest cruise liner to be launched sideways from a slipway. She performed her sea trials between 26 and 30 December 1985, but was not delivered to Home Lines until 6 May 1986.

Following the sale of the ship to Holland America Line (and the sale of HAL itself to the Carnival Corporation), the ship was renamed Westerdam, and returned to Meyer Werft on 30 October 1989 for a $84 million refit. The ship was lengthened by 36.9 m (121 ft 1 in) and many of her interiors were rebuilt. The refit, one of the most extensive ever performed on a passenger ship, was completed on 12 March 1990.

A model of Costa Europa as with Costa Cruises on display in İzmir, Turkey

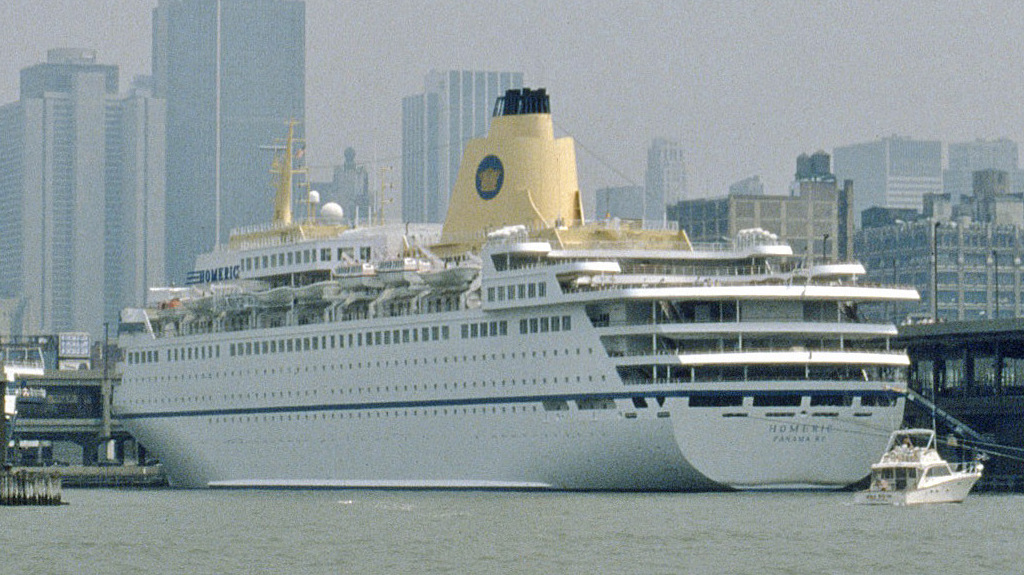
Homeric in New York City in 1987

In 2002, prior to entering service as Costa Europa for Costa Cruises, the ship received a £5 million refit, with some of the public rooms redecorated and six balcony suites added.

== Service history ==
=== 1986–1988: Homeric ===
During her service with Home Lines the Homeric was used for cruises from New York to Bermuda during the Northern Hemisphere summer season and cruises in the Caribbean during the rest of the year. While popular, especially with Home Lines' loyal base of repeat passengers, the ultimate success of the Homeric in service with the historic company has been questioned. One author described her in summation as the "giant swan song" of the company. Certainly, times were changing and the end of the company reflected trends in the quickly evolving cruise market. Home Lines was finally purchased by the Holland America Line in 1988.

=== 1988–2002: Westerdam ===
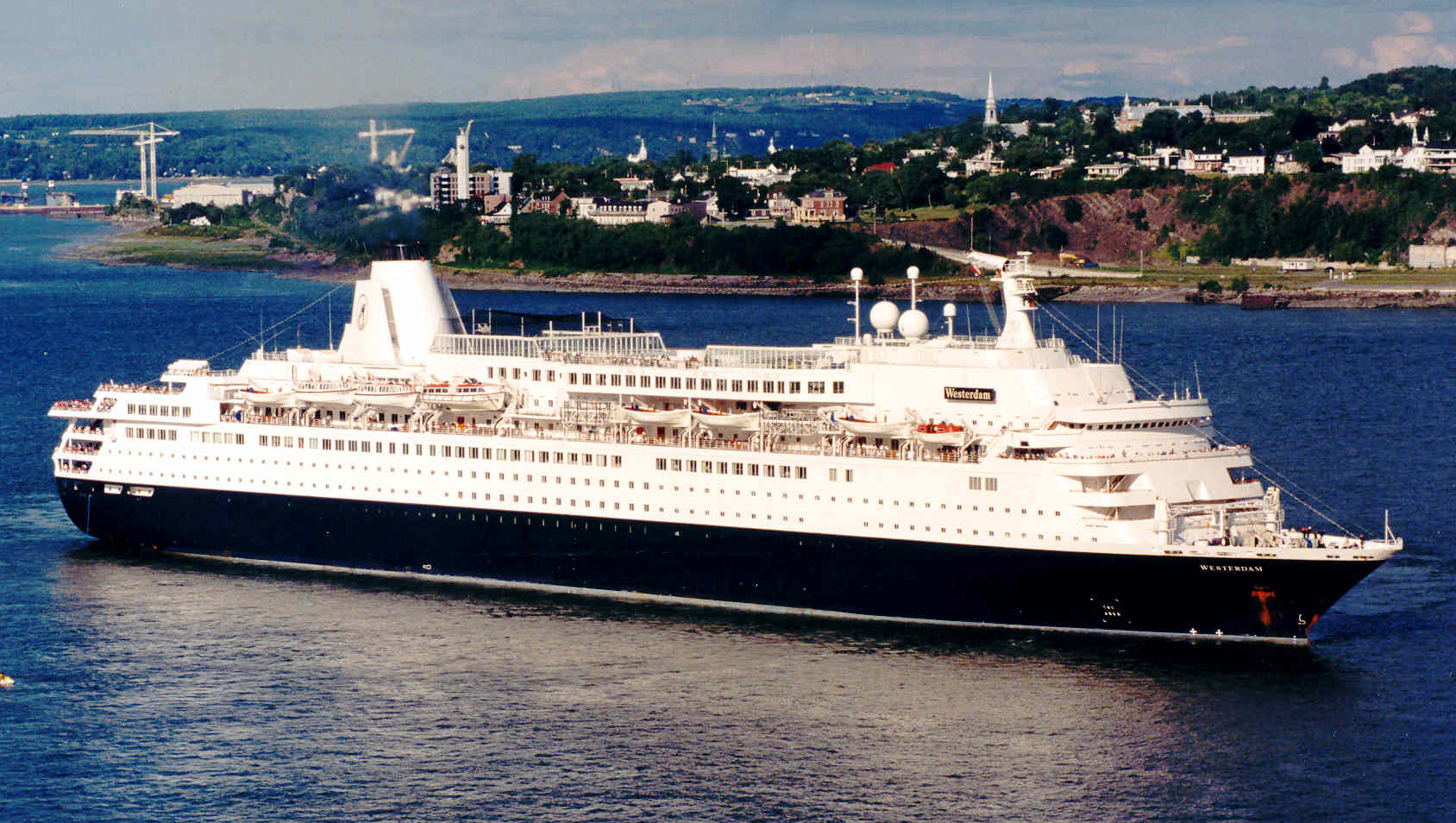
Westerdam at Quebec City, Canada

In November 1988 the Homeric joined the fleet of Holland America Line and was renamed Westerdam (different sites state different dates for her transfer to the HAL fleet). In service with her new owners, the Westerdam cruised to Alaska during the summer season, returning to the Caribbean for the winter. Soon after Home Lines had been purchased by Holland America, HAL itself was purchased by the Carnival Corporation. HAL's new owners decided to invest heavily in the fairly new Westerdam, and between October 1989 and March 1990 she was extensively rebuilt and enlarged at Meyer Werft. When the Westerdam entered service for HAL, she was registered in The Bahamas, but in 1996 she was re-registered to the Netherlands.

In 2002, following the delivery of several newbuilds for Holland America Line, the Westerdam was transferred to the fleet of Costa Cruises.

=== 2002 – April 2010: Costa Europa ===
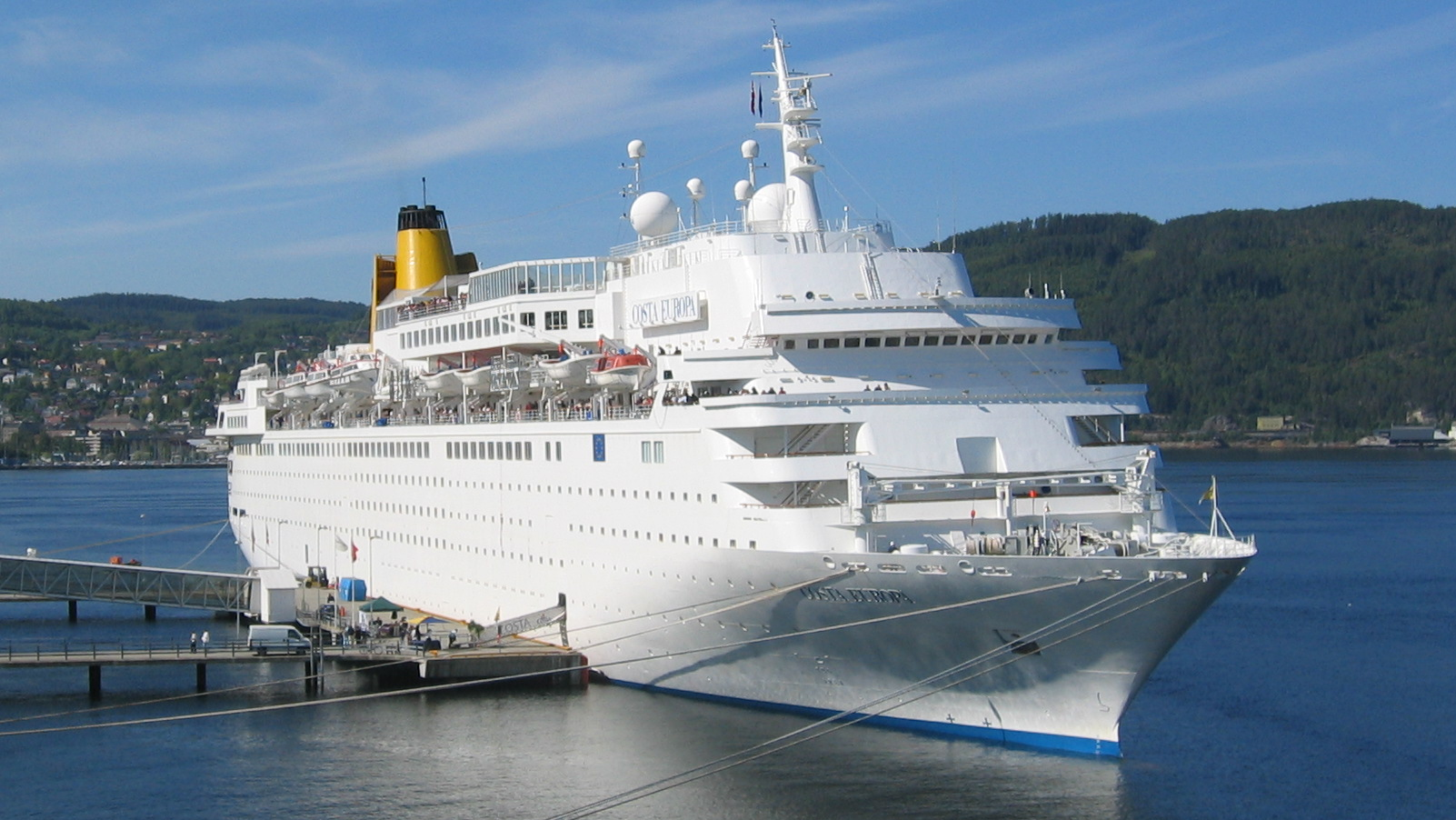
Costa Europa in Trondheim, Norway

Following the transfer to Costa Cruises in April 2002, the Westerdam was renamed Costa Europa and re-registered in Italy. On 27 April 2002 she started on her first cruise for her new owners from Genoa, subsequently being used for cruises around Europe.

=== April 2010 – October 2017 ===
Costa Europa left the fleet of Costa Cruises in April 2010, being bareboat chartered to the United Kingdom-based Thomson Cruises for ten years. The charter agreement also included an option for Thomson Cruises to buy the ship after five years. The ship was renamed Thomson Dream for her service with Thomson. Thomson Dream received a refurbishment at the end of 2012 and introduced into the Platinum collection of cruises.

=== October 2017 – 2022 ===
The ship served as Marella Dream for cruises with the newly rebranded Marella Cruises, previously known as Thomson Cruises, until 1 October 2020, when Marella announced that she would be retired and all her summer sailings would be transferred to Marella Discovery. Afterwards, the ship was sold to Turkish shipbreakers and laid up at Perama, Greece, along with other cruise ships and drillships, awaiting capacity at the Turkish yard. In 2021 the ship was renamed Ella and on 18 June 2022 arrived in tow at Aliaga for demolition.

== Incidents ==
=== 2009 passenger mutiny ===
In February 2009, Costa Europa had engine trouble on an Indian Ocean cruise and passengers mutinied after scheduled stops were cancelled.

=== 2010 dock collision ===
On 26 February 2010, Costa Europa collided with a dock at Sharm al-Sheikh in Egypt, after attempting to dock in bad weather. The collision killed three crew members and injured at least four other people, three of them passengers. The incident tore a 2 metres (6 ft 7 in) wide hole in the hull, and the ship was listed to port to lift the damaged area clear of the water. The report into the incident, to be handled by the Italian maritime authorities based in Genoa, had still not been handed to the IMO in January 2012.

=== Coronavirus pandemic ===
On 2020.03.27, a 48-year-old Indonesian crew member of MS Marella Dream died on board the ship with symptoms consistent with COVID-19 while the ship was anchored near Gibraltar. A spokesperson for owner TUI Group stated that "[t]he crew member had underlying health issues and had not tested positive for Covid-19 and there are no positive cases of Covid-19 on board the ship", leading sources to conclude that either he had not been tested, (Note: This is possibly because the spokesperson had not been reported to have stated that the crew member had tested negative.) or that he had died of the virus. Gibraltar officials refused permission for the disembarkation of the body, asked the ship to leave British Gibraltar Territorial Waters, and stated that any inquiry into the death of the crew member was the responsibility of Malta, the ship's flag state. Marella Dream later docked in Málaga, Spain, on 28 March 2020, to disembark the deceased crew member.

== Design ==
=== Exterior design ===
The Homeric was built with a terraced forward and rear superstructure, with lifeboats placed fairly high. She had a relatively large funnel, with a large arch behind it to deflect some soot away from the rear decks. In original Home Lines livery she had a white hull and superstructure, with a blue decorative riband separating them. Her funnel and radar mast, the structures immediately below them and the cranes on her forward deck were painted yellow. The ship's name was painted in tall letters on the side of the superstructure below the radar mast.

On entering service with Holland America Line, the Westerdam received HAL's dark blue hull colours, with her funnel and radar mast painted white. The 1989–90 lengthening altered her exterior appearance somewhat. The windows of the added section are larger than those forward and aft.

As Costa Europa, the ship was painted all-white, with a yellow funnel and a small flag of the EU painted on the side of the superstructure.

As Thomson Dream the ship retains an all-white livery, but with a blue funnel bearing the TUI/Thomson group logo.

=== Interior design ===
Unusually for a cruise ship of her time, the Homeric was built with a somewhat ocean liner-like layout, with her dining room in particular reflecting liner-like design, being located on a lower deck. She was also built with a sizeable promenade deck and a one-deck-high theatre. She was built with two swimming pools, one to the rear of the ship and another amidship which was covered with a magrodome.

During the 1989–90 refit, two lounges in the forward section of the ship were combined to create a large two-level theatre, with the original theatre retained as a cinema. In HAL service, she was decorated with artworks drawing on the history of the Dutch Empire. On entering service with Costa Cruises, the ship was refurbished, with some of the interior decorations changed to brighter and more southern / Pan-European style. The original theatre was built in with six balcony suites, and a new ballroom with a hardwood dance floor replaced an earlier lounge. Despite the refit, most of the ship's decorations have been retained from the HAL days, resulting in the Costa Europa having somewhat different interior decorations from her "Italian-style" fleetmates.

=== Decks and facilities ===
1. Tank Top – Laundry, engine room
2. C – Crew cabins, engine room, stores
3. B – Crew cabins, hospital, tender embarkation area, engine room, garbage area, stores
4. Orion deck – Orion restaurant (main dining room), inside and outside cabins, main galley, crew messrooms
5. Pegasus deck – Inside and outside cabins
6. Perseus deck – Inside and outside cabins
7. Auriga deck – Suites, inside and outside cabins
8. Hercules deck – Theatre (lower level), Medusa ballroom, Ocean bar, Argo lounge, lecture room, card room, library, shops, games arcade, beauty salon, casino, discothèque, Kidzone
9. Andromeda deck – Theatre (upper level), buffet restaurant, outside cabins, sun deck, swimming pool. The two muster stations (A and B) are located on this deck.
10. Cassiopea deck – Bridge, fitness center, outside cabins, officers' cabins, sun deck
11. Sirens deck – A la carte and buffet restaurants, sun deck, magrodome covered swimming pool, suites
12. Centaurus deck – Tennis courts, crew sunbathing deck, funnel, pool deck, upper level open top sun deck

== Media appearances ==
MS Westerdam was featured in the 1997 comedy film Out to Sea with Jack Lemmon and Walter Matthau.

The ship appeared on BBC One's Watchdog during an investigation into customer complaints. The report found broken air conditioning units and sewage and plumbing problems during the first few voyages with Thomson. The company were also criticised for broadcasting "misleading" advertisements, claiming the ship was "luxury, brand new and 5*" when in fact it was over 24 years old.
