= SS Edam =

SS Edam was the name of four ships operated by the Holland America Line.

- Edam (1881) - 2,950 tons, sank 1882 in a collision with SS Lepanto of the Wilson Line.
- Edam (1883) - 3,130 tons, sank 1895 in a collision with SS Turkistan.
- Edam (1895) - 3,329 tons, former British Empire and SS Rotterdam, scrapped 1899 in Italy.
- Edam (1921) - 8,871 tons, scrapped 1954 in Hong Kong.
