= SS Rotterdam (1886) =

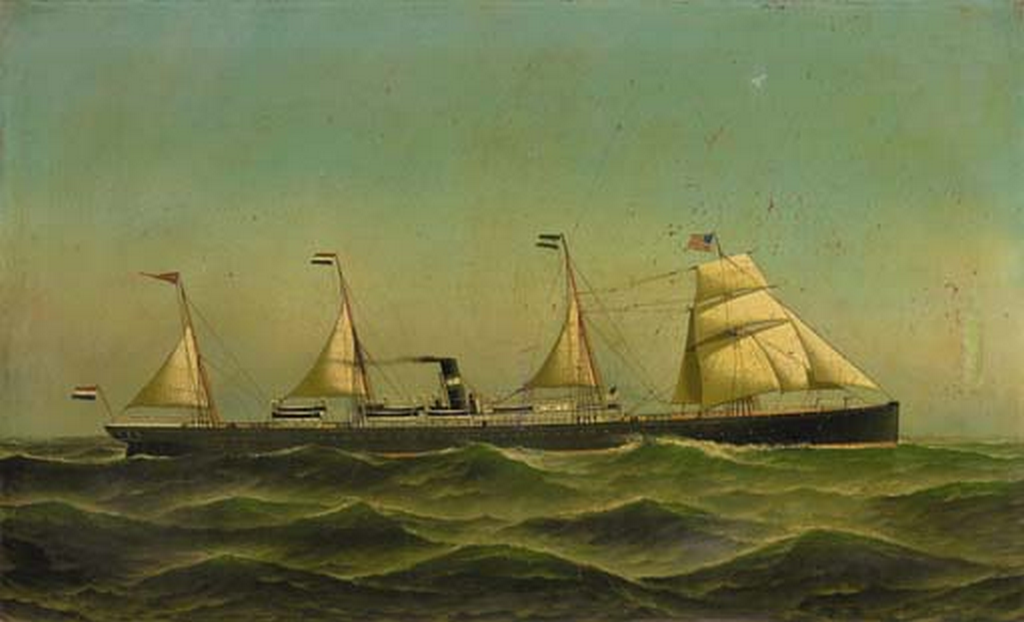

History

(1878–1880)United Kingdom
- Name: SS British Empire
- Namesake: British Empire
- Owner: British Ship Owners Co.
- Operator: chartered to American Line and Guion Line
- Route: Liverpool-Philadelphia
- Builder: Harland and Wolff
- Launched: 18 May 1878
- Maiden voyage: 25 September 1878
- Fate: Sold 1886 to Holland America Line

History

Netherlands
- Name: Rotterdam
- Namesake: Rotterdam (1886-1895) - Rotterdam Edam (1895-1899) - Edam, Netherlands
- Owner: Holland America Line
- Operator: Holland America Line
- Route: Rotterdam-New York City (1886-1890, 1892-1895); Amsterdam-New York City (1890-1892, 1895-1899)
- Renamed: Edam (1895)
- Fate: Scrapped in Italy in 1899

SS Rotterdam was a 19th-century ocean-going steamer. She was built in 1878 by the shipbuilding firm, Harland and Wolff, and had a gross tonnage of 3,361 tons. Originally named British Empire, she was owned by the British Ship Owners Co. and operated by the American Line. Her maiden voyage began on September 25, 1878, going from Liverpool, England, to Philadelphia, Pennsylvania in 13 days, arriving on October 7, 1878. The Liverpool-Philadelphia line was her main route until being sold in 1886 to the Nederlandsche-Amerikaansche Stoomvaart Maatschappij (Dutch-American Steamship Company), more commonly known as the Holland America Line. She was then renamed Rotterdam, being the second HAL ship to bear that name. Her route was also changed to Rotterdam-New York City, later being modified in 1890 to Amsterdam-New York City. In 1895, her name was once again changed to SS Edam, of which she was the third HAL ship. She continued ferrying passengers and cargo across the Atlantic Ocean until 1899 after which she was scrapped in Italy.
