= Coat of arms of Rotterdam =

Versions
- Escutcheon-only version
- Armiger: Rotterdam
- Shield: two red Dutch lions and two black Hainaut lions, green field charged with a white pale
- Supporters: two golden lions
- Compartment: stone pedestal
- Motto: Sterker door strijd (Stronger through conflict)

The coat of arms of Rotterdam is the official symbol of the city of Rotterdam. It consists of a shield and has a green band of the original arms of Weena, bisected by a white band symbolizes the Rotte, two golden lions, and four lions, two black and two red on a gold field, and the motto of Rotterdam.

To the surrender of Rotterdam, the weapon was given by William I, Count of Holland and Hainaut in thanks for the support of the lords of the Court of Wena in its fight against Flanders in 1304. The lions are the two red Dutch lions and two black Hainaut lions.

After World War II the motto Sterker door strijd (Stronger through struggle) was added to the coat arms of Rotterdam. This motto was granted in January 1948 by Queen Wilhelmina.

== Heraldic elements ==
=== Escutcheon ===
The flag from the shield of the coat of arms of Rotterdam

In the coat of arms of Rotterdam, the field of the escutcheon (heraldic shield) is green. The field is charged with a white pale. The field and the pale result in three vertical bands in the colours green, white, and green.

=== Golden lions ===
The supporters of the escutcheon are two rampant golden lions. The compartment the lions stand on is a stone pedestal. The lions were added to the coat of arms in the 16th century.

=== Motto ===
The Queen of the Netherlands wanted to remember the role of the citizens of Rotterdam during World War II and created a motto consisting of the Dutch words "Sterker door strijd", meaning "Stronger through conflict". The American town of Rotterdam, New York also uses this motto. In January 1948, Wilhelmina presented the motto as part of the coat of arms of Rotterdam to the city government.

...as a reminder also for posterity of the courage and strength with which the people of Rotterdam bore all the trials of the war and the important part they took in the liberation of the fatherland....
—Wilhelmina of the Netherlands

In the coat of arms of Rotterdam, the motto is written on a scroll. This scroll is positioned on top of the compartment under the escutcheon.

== Use of the coat of arms ==
As a coat of arms of a Dutch municipality, the coat of arms of Rotterdam is registered with the Hoge Raad van Adel (cf. College of Arms). These coats of arms are all effectively in the public domain, as the municipalities cannot claim copyright. In contrast, actually using the coat of arms to suggest any kind of official endorsement is restricted. The coat of arms may only be used by others than the city with the explicit permission of the municipal government. In general permission is not granted to others, because the coat of arms designates the city of Rotterdam.

== Notes ==
1. ^{i} Original quote in Dutch: "Als herinnering ook voor het nageslacht aan de moed en de kracht waarmede de bevolking van Rotterdam alle beproevingen van de oorlog heeft gedragen en het belangrijke aandeel dat zij genomen heeft in de bevrijding des vaderlands."
