= Holland America Line =

Cruise line; former transatlantic passenger and cargo line

Holland America Line N.V.
- Type: Subsidiary
- Industry: Hospitality; Tourism; Transportation
- Founded: 1873; 153 years ago (as the Netherlands-America Steamship Company)
- Headquarters: Seattle, Washington, United States
- Key people: Beth Bodensteiner (President)
- Products: Cruises
- Parent: Carnival Corporation & plc
- Website: www.hollandamerica.com

Holland America Line N.V. (HAL) is an American cruise line. Founded in 1873 in Rotterdam, Netherlands, as the Netherlands-America Steamship Company (NASM), the company operated regular transatlantic passenger and cargo services between Rotterdam and North America until 1971. As a dedicated cruise line, the company expanded through multiple acquisitions including Westours in 1971, Windstar Cruises in 1988, and Home Lines in 1988. In 1989, the company was acquired by Carnival Corporation.

Headquartered in Seattle, Washington, the line's cruise ships carry the names of former transatlantic ocean liners operated by the company. Its current flagship, Rotterdam (2020), is the seventh ship to bear such a name. As a major operator of cruises and overland tours in Alaska, the company owns multiple hotels and two railroads throughout the state. The line also offers an annual world cruise and cruises throughout the Caribbean, South America, Europe, Asia, and Antarctica.

== History ==
=== Early decades ===
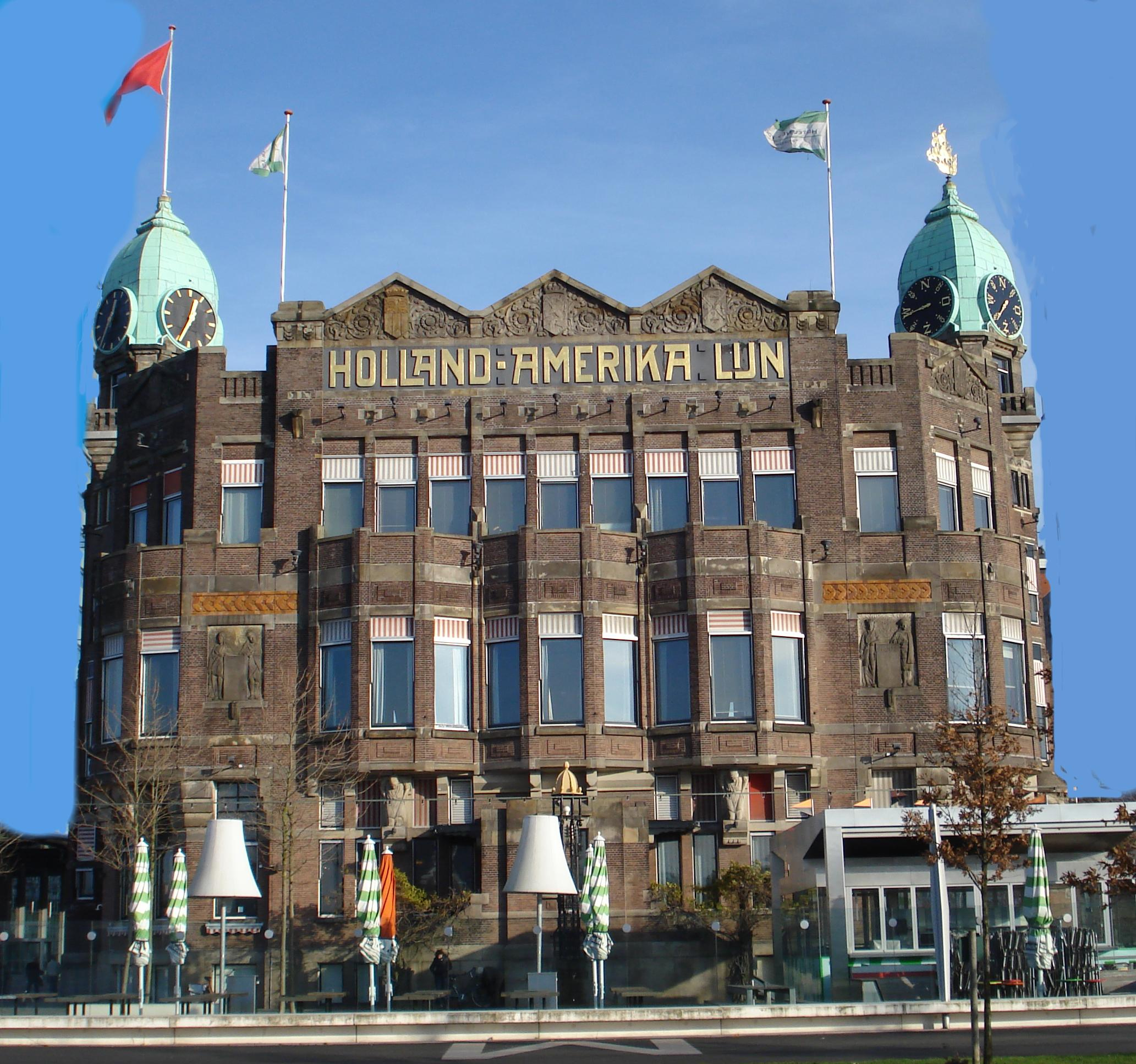
The first Holland America headquarters in Rotterdam, now the Hotel New York.

Holland America Line was founded in 1873 as the Nederlandsch-Amerikaansche Stoomvaart Maatschappij (NASM). Known colloquially and advertised as Holland-Amerika Lijn (HAL), the company was founded after Rotterdam (I) operated its first crossing from Rotterdam to Hoboken in October 1872. Rotterdam (I) operated regular fifteen-day crossings with intermediate stops in Boulogne, France and Plymouth, United Kingdom until she sank in 1883. By that time, the line's fleet had grown to include the combination liners SS W.A. Scholten, SS P. Caland, SS Leerdam, and SS Edam. In 1885, Rotterdam (II) was acquired to replace the original. HAL's first house flag was introduced at around this time, featuring a tri-band of green-white-green derived from the flag of Rotterdam. This design, which was also replicated on ships' funnels, remained unchanged until 1971.Rotterdam (II) operated the line's first pleasure cruise in 1885, transiting the Kiel Canal to Copenhagen. Rotterdam (III) followed in 1897 as the company expanded rapidly. Statendam (I) of 1898 was HAL's first ship of greater than 10,000 gross register tons (GRT) and by the line's 25th anniversary that year, the company had successfully carried over 400,000 immigrants from Europe to North America.

Holland America Line's first house flag, based on the flag of Rotterdam.

=== Larger ships ===
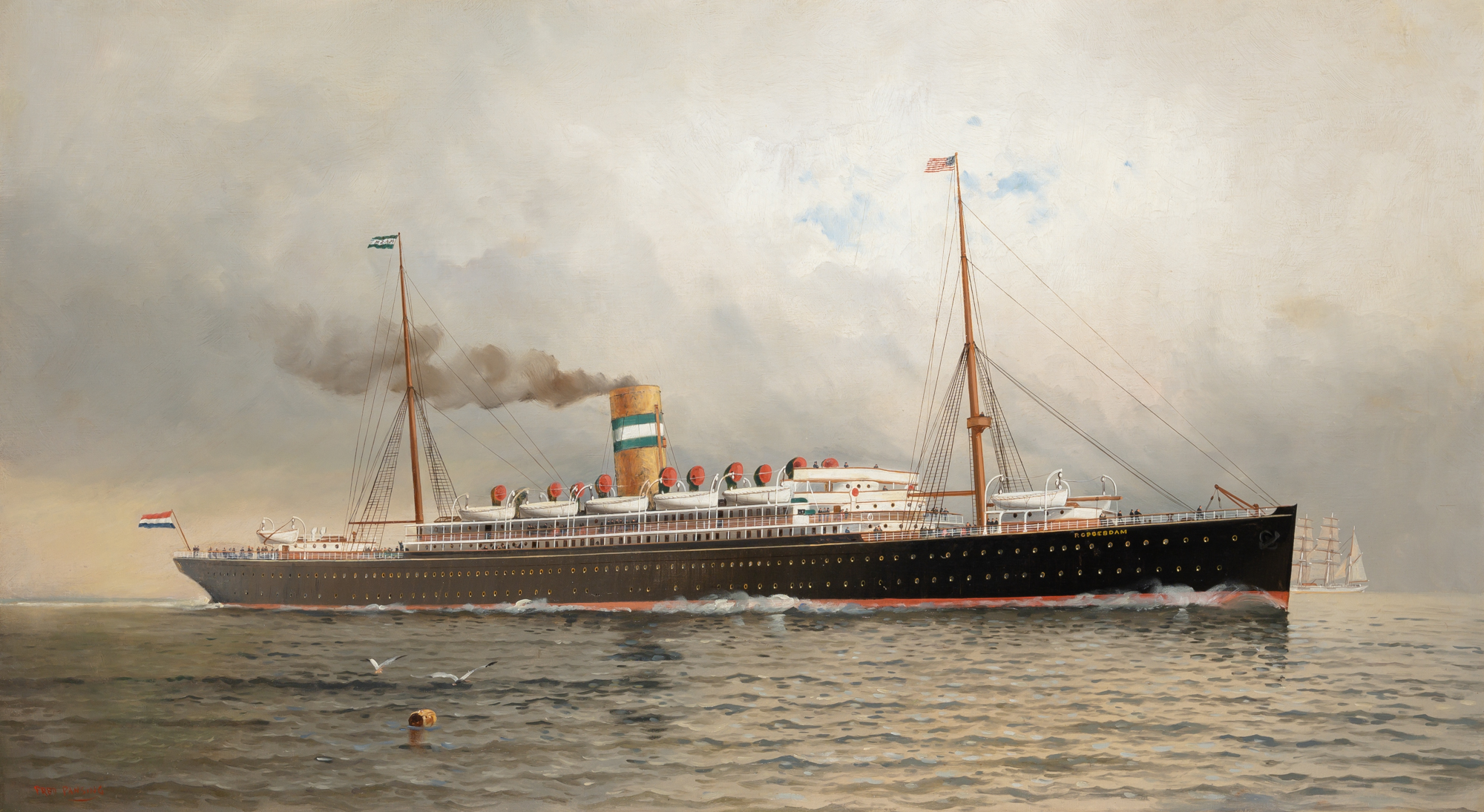
A painting of Rotterdam (III), launched by Harland & Wolff in 1897.

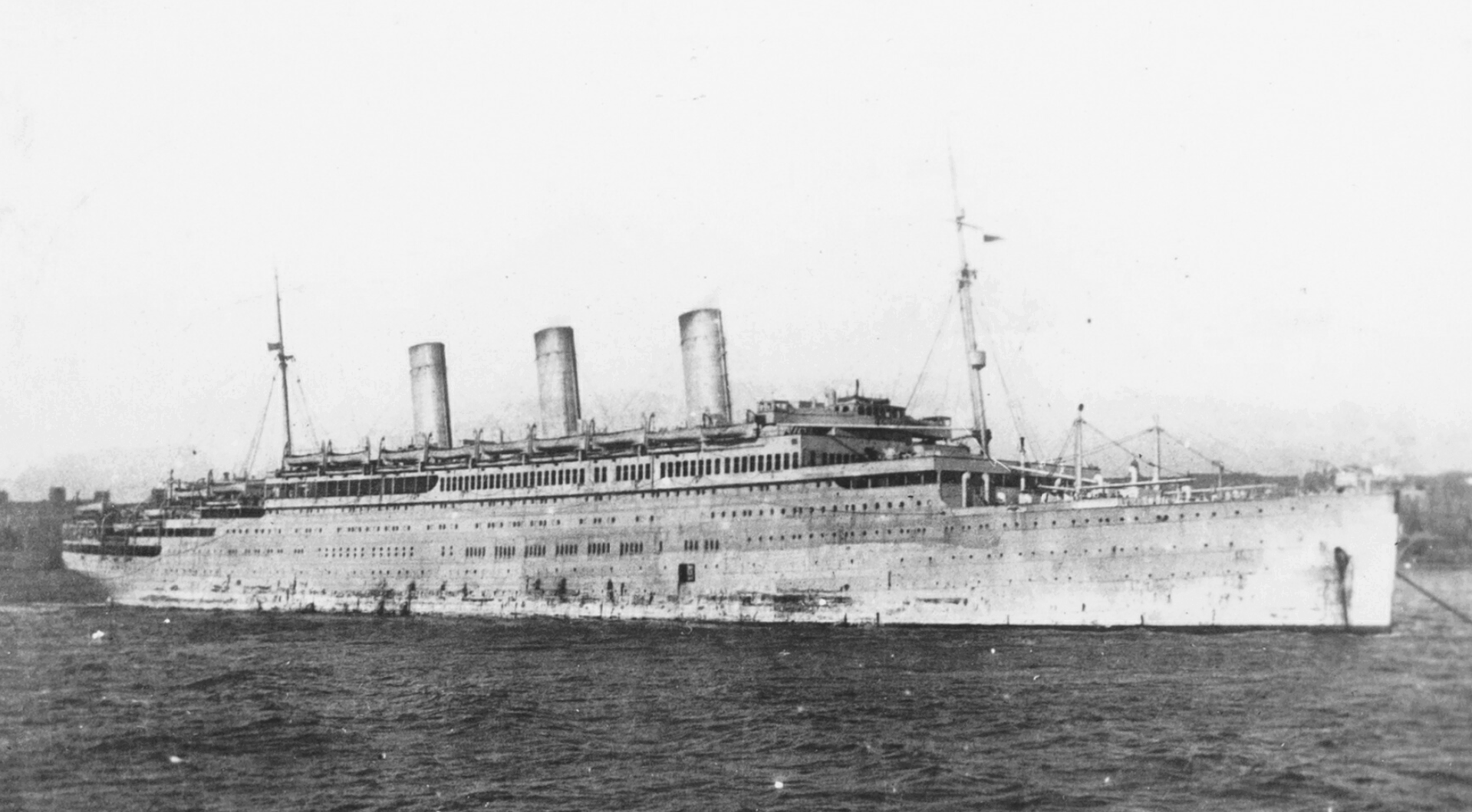
Statendam (III) became troopship Justicia in 1914, and was sunk in 1918.

A trio of large ships built at Blohm+Voss entered service starting with SS Potsdam in 1899, Rijndam (I) in 1901, and Noordam (I) in 1902. Each ship measured at greater than 12,000 GRT, increasing the line's capacity significantly. In 1902, the independent line was acquired by the International Mercantile Marine Company (IMM). Owned by American industrialist J.P. Morgan as a price-fixing cartel, Holland America was approached by Harland & Wolff shipyard chairman William Pirrie in a transaction that did not disclose his IMM connections.

As an unwitting member of IMM, the line introduced ever-larger ships including the 16,967 GRT Nieuw Amsterdam (I) of 1905 and the 24,129 GRT Rotterdam (IV) of 1908. Both ships were built by Harland & Wolff.

=== First World War ===
Statendam (II) launched in July 1914 and was due to be HAL's largest-ever ship at 32,120 GRT. However, World War I ignited one month later and the ship was requisitioned by the United Kingdom during outfitting at Harland & Wolff. Reconfigured as the Justicia, she became the largest troopship to serve in the war and was torpedoed by a U-boat in 1918. NASM eventually accepted compensation in the form of 60,000 tons of steel from the UK Government. Dutch neutrality throughout the war did not spare multiple HAL ships, and the line lost five ships totalling over 30,000 GRT. Two German mines sank SS Eemdijk in 1915, and in 1916 U-53 sank SS Blommersdijk. In February 1917, U-21 sank an entire Dutch convoy including the SS Noorderdijk and SS Zaandijk.

During the war, Dutch capitalists progressively purchased large shares of HAL from IMM and its subsidiaries. By 1917, these investors had successfully acquired half of IMM's shares in Holland America Line for over $3.5 million. In 1918, American president Woodrow Wilson issued authorization to seize 89 Dutch ships under angary. Nine of the line's ships were seized by the United States Shipping Board, including Rijndam (I) who survived the war as a troopship under the name USS Rijndam. Of these nine ships, only SS Ossterdijk did not return after sinking due to a collision.

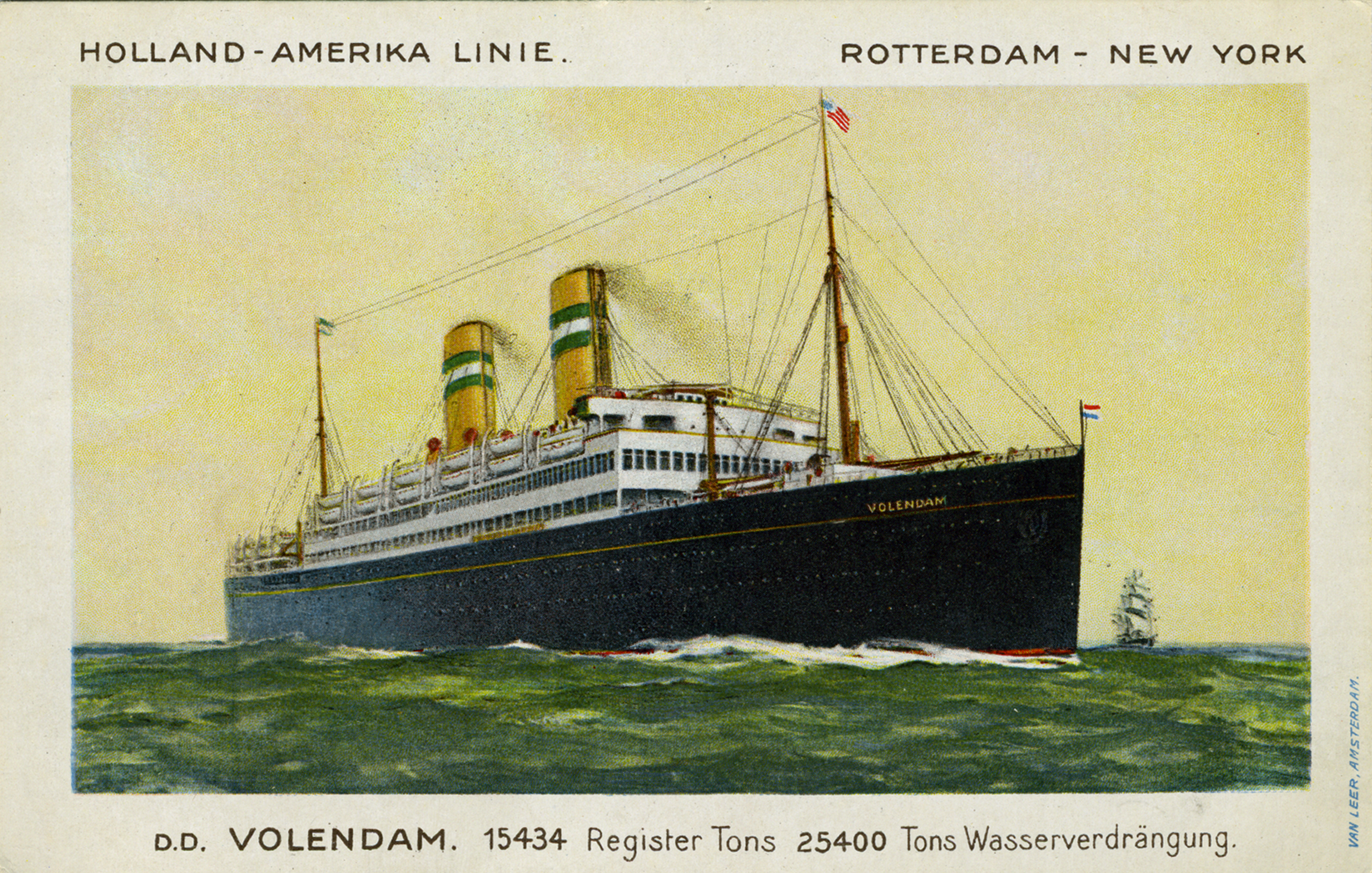
A painting of Volendam (I), completed in 1922.

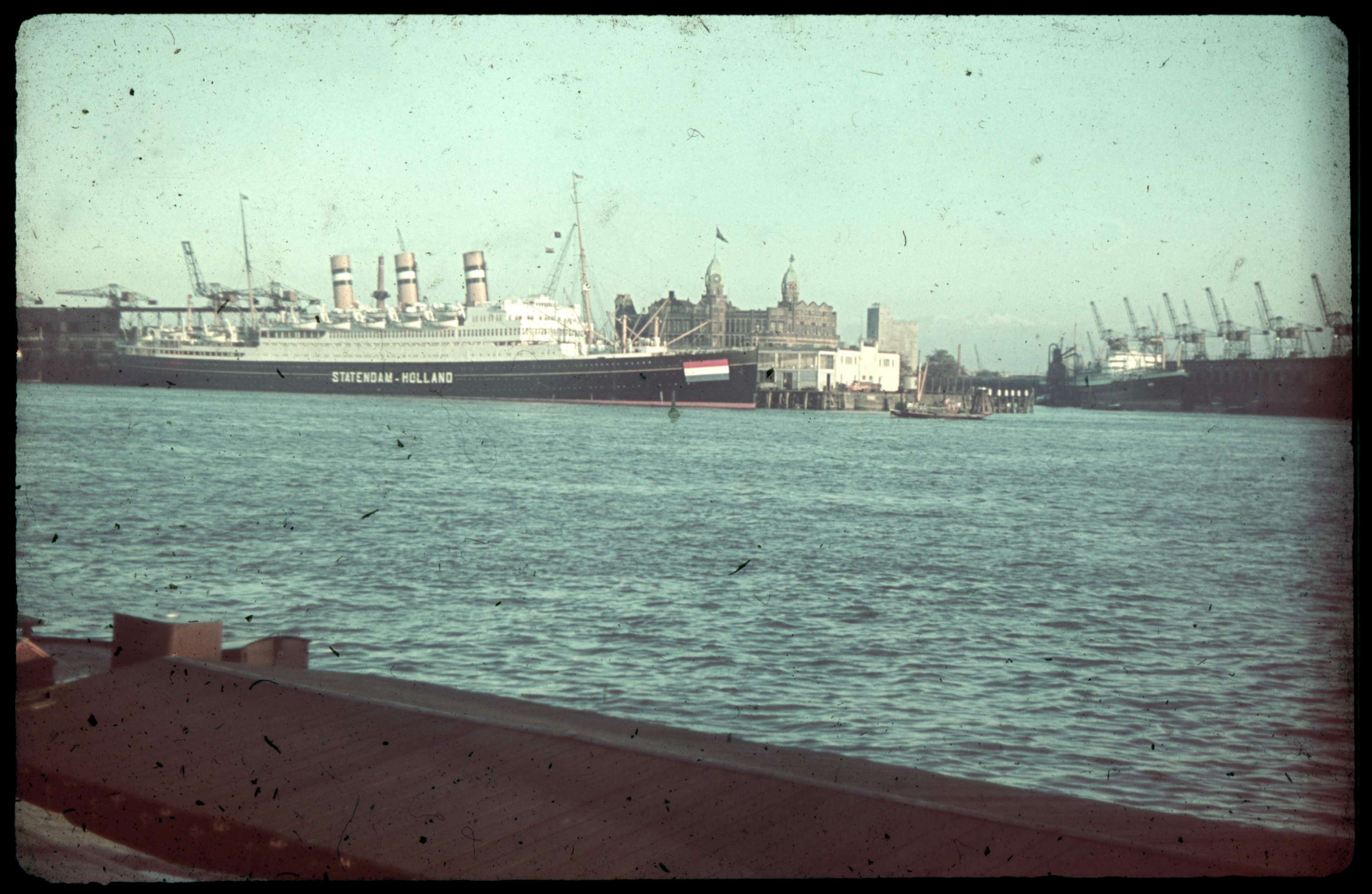
Statendam (III) was laid down in 1921 but was not completed until 1929. Photographed in 1939, in Rotterdam.

=== Between the World Wars ===
Maasdam (I) and Edam (III) introduced steam turbine power to the Holland America fleet in 1921, entering service as 8,800 GRT ships serving ports including Antwerp, Bilbao, Santander, Gijón, Vigo, and Havana en route to Tampico. Volendam (I) and Veendam (I) followed in 1922, both of which served the flagship transatlantic route to Hoboken via Southampton, Halifax, and Boulogne.

Also in 1921, the line introduced its first motor ships with MV Dinteldijk and MV Drechtdijk. The 9,350 GRT refrigerated cargo ships had berths for up to 19 first class passengers and were followed by the larger MV Delftdijk and MV Damsterdijk in 1929 and 1930.

Statendam (III) was commissioned at Harland & Wolff for completion in 1924, but Holland America Line ordered work to stop due to a lack of funds. After being laid up in an incomplete state for three years, the Dutch government issued NASM a loan for the ship's completion. After being towed to Wilton's Dok- en Werf Maatschappij in Schiedam, work was finally completed in 1929. Despite the onset of the Great Depression, Statendam (III) proved economical to run and served on the transatlantic run coupled with cruises to the Caribbean throughout the 1930s.

By 1930 Holland America had expanded as far as the West Coast of the United States via the Panama Canal. In collaboration with Royal Mail Lines, HAL's refrigerated cargo ships (as indicated by the -dijk suffix) ran tandem routes with RML ships including the Lochmonar and Lochgoil. New destinations for the line on these services included London, Vancouver, Guayaquil, and Bermuda.

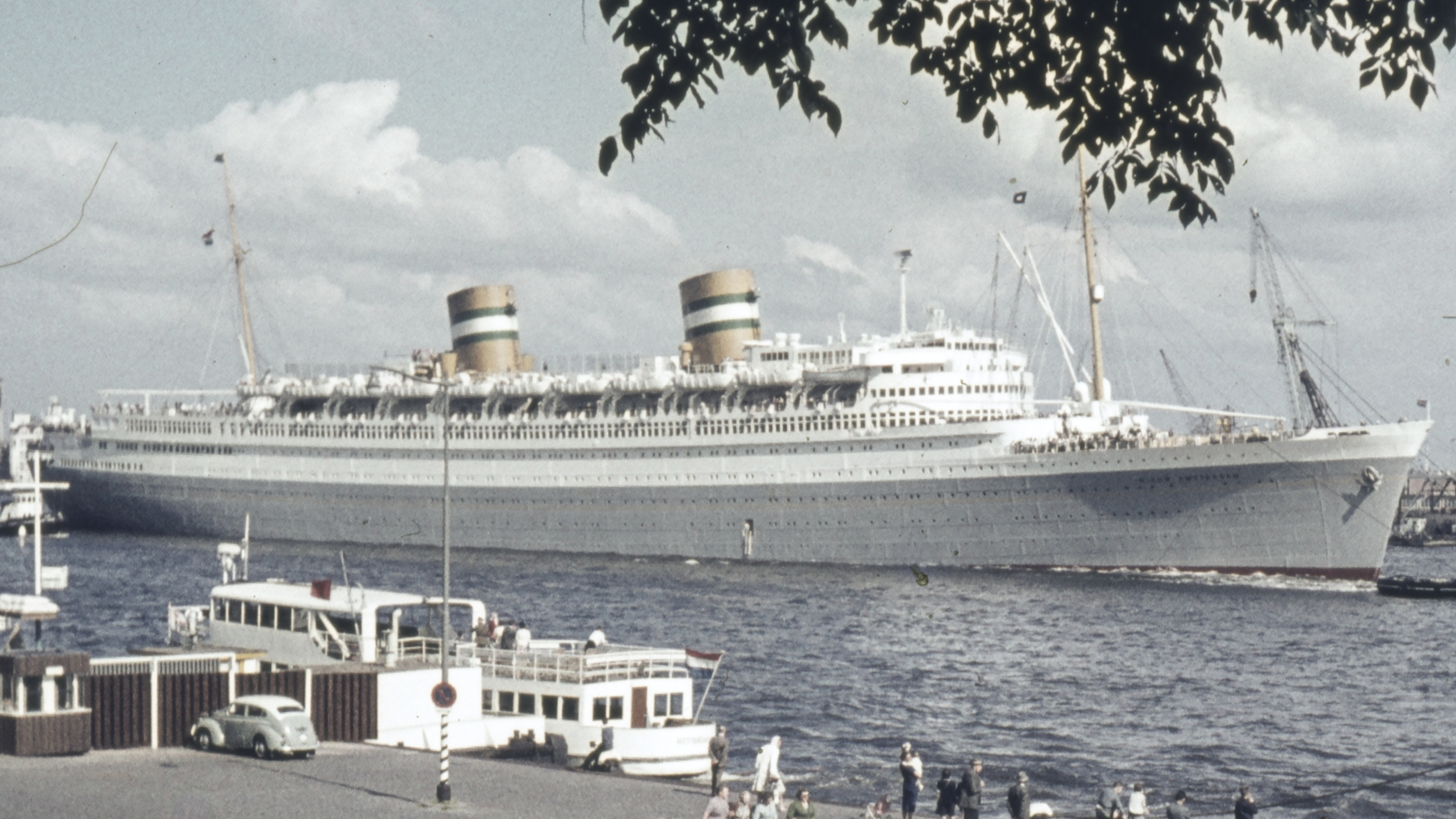
Nieuw Amsterdam (II) entered service in 1938. She is the line's modern logo.

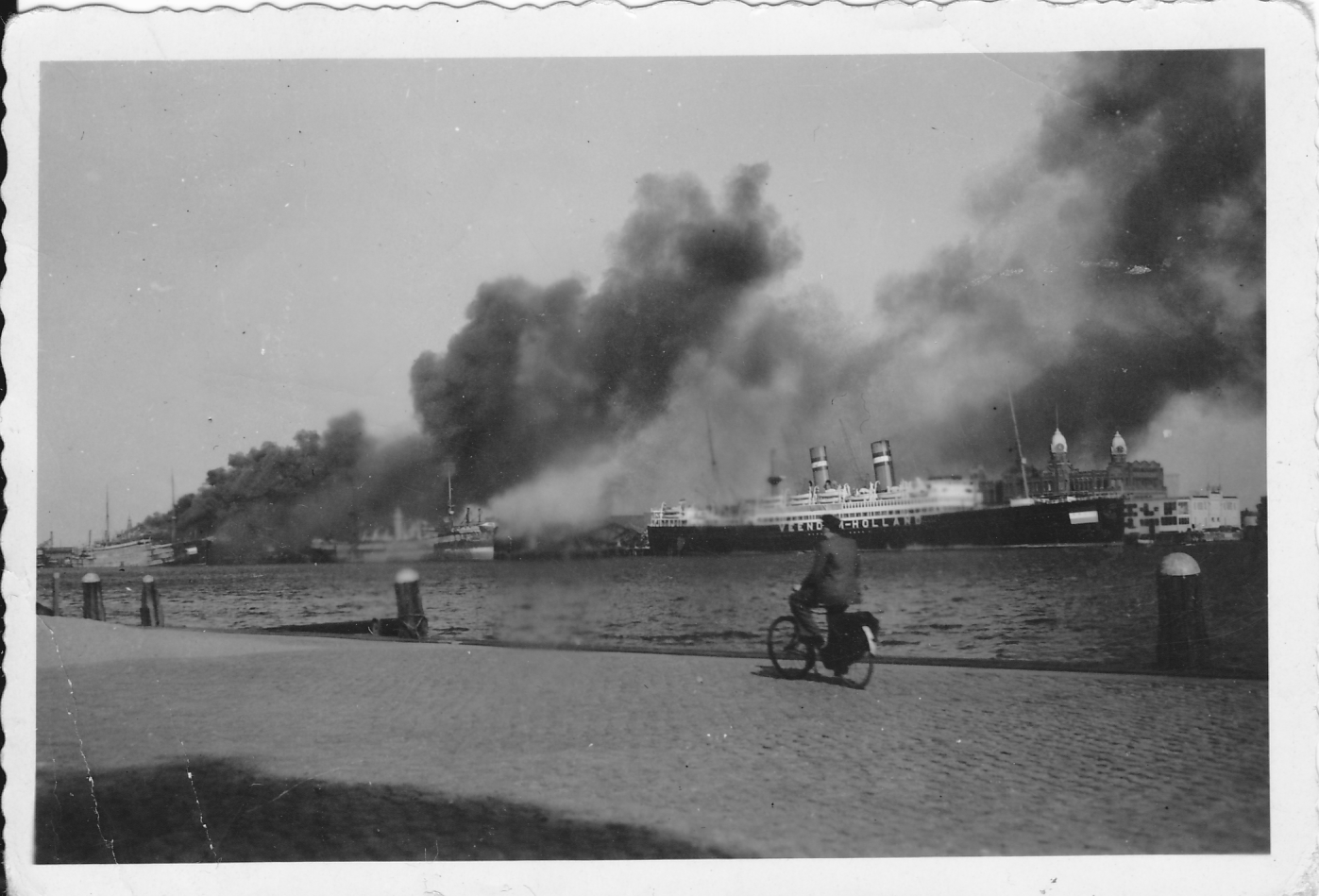
Statendam (III) at left and Veendam (II) at right burning during the battle for Rotterdam.

In 1937 the line introduced Nieuw Amsterdam (II) as its new flagship. The 36,287 GRT liner cost the line 20 million guilders and immediately became the largest ship in the Dutch merchant fleet. Variously hailed as the 'Darling of the Dutch' and a 'Ship of Tomorrow', Nieuw Amsterdam (II) earned prestige as the new Dutch ship of state, rivaling contemporaries such as the RMS Queen Mary, SS Normandie, and SS Rex. The line's modern logo, in use from 1983 to present day, is an artistic depiction of Nieuw Amsterdam (II) at sea.

=== Second World War ===
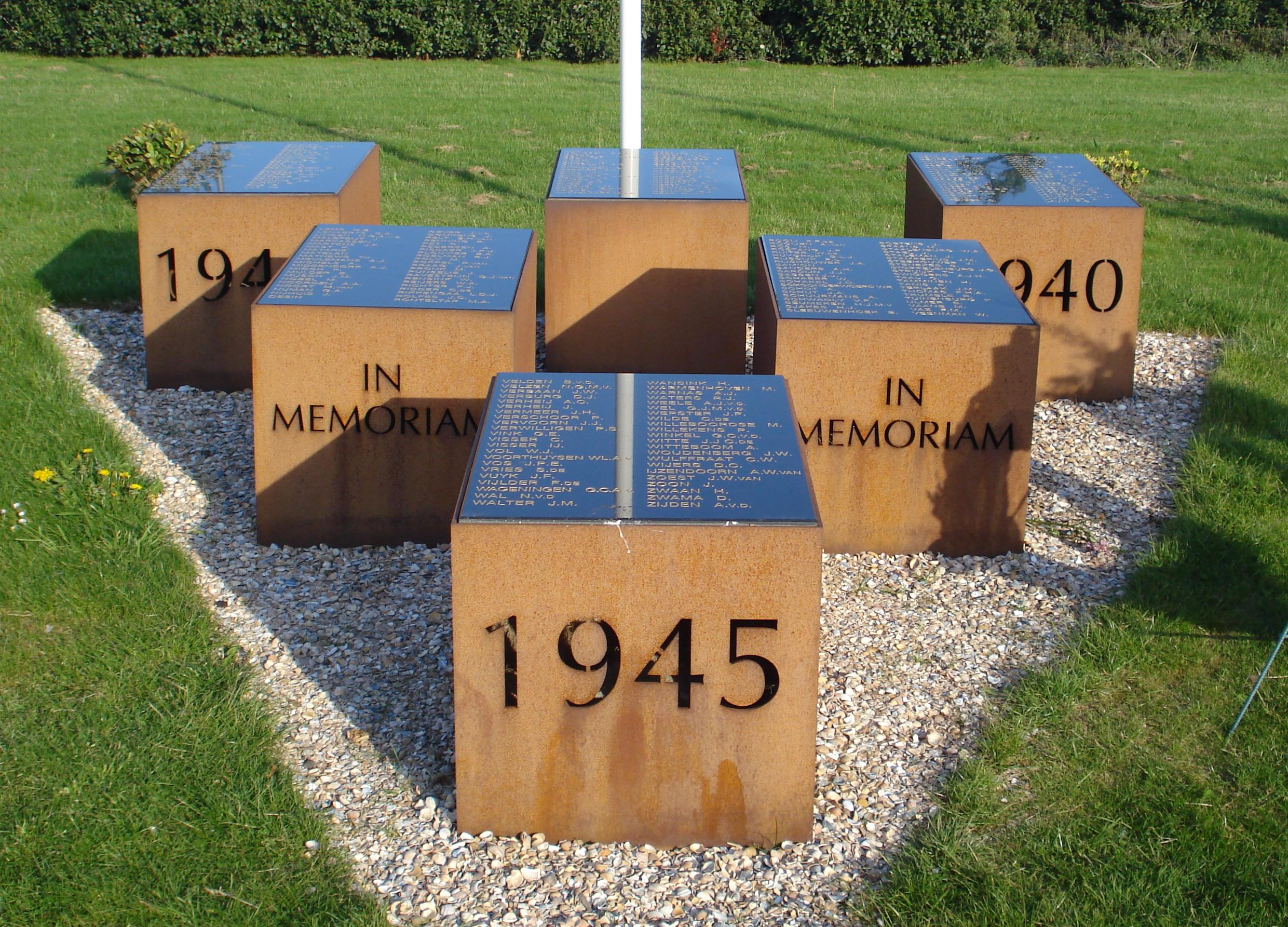
Holland America's World War II memorial in Katendrecht, Netherlands.

In World War II, Holland America lost thirteen ships totaling over 140,000 GRT. Early in the war MV Binnendijk and SS Spaarndam were lost to mines, and MV Burgerdijk was sunk by U-48 in 1940. During the German invasion of the Netherlands, multiple HAL ships were burnt out during the battle for Rotterdam. Statendam (III), MV Boschdijk, and MV Dinteldijk were lost in the initial battle, with MV Boschdijk later towed to the Baltic Sea as target practice for the Luftwaffe. MV Dinteldijk was eventually scuttled in Rotterdam harbor as a blockship.

During the German occupation of the Netherlands, Holland America Line warehouses in Rotterdam were used to store hundreds of household shipments belonging to Jewish refugees who had fled Nazi Germany. In 2026, an investigation by the Dutch newspaper NRC reported that at least 460 such shipments were held in HAL facilities, including the San Francisco warehouse. According to the investigation, many of these goods were subsequently released to German occupation authorities and Nazi confiscation agencies, which auctioned, redistributed, or otherwise disposed of the property. The investigation further reported that HAL charged storage fees on the goods and, after the war, generally rejected compensation claims submitted by former owners and their heirs. The company and its wartime directors were not prosecuted after the war.

After the establishment of the Dutch government-in-exile, Holland America announced its intention to charter all of its transatlantic ships to the UK Government with the exception of Nieuw Amsterdam (II). SS Pennland and SS Westernland were quickly requisitioned as troopships, and Nieuw Amsterdam (II) eventually joined the war effort in October 1940. She survived the war, sailing over half a million miles and transporting over 400,000 military personnel for the allied forces as a troopship.

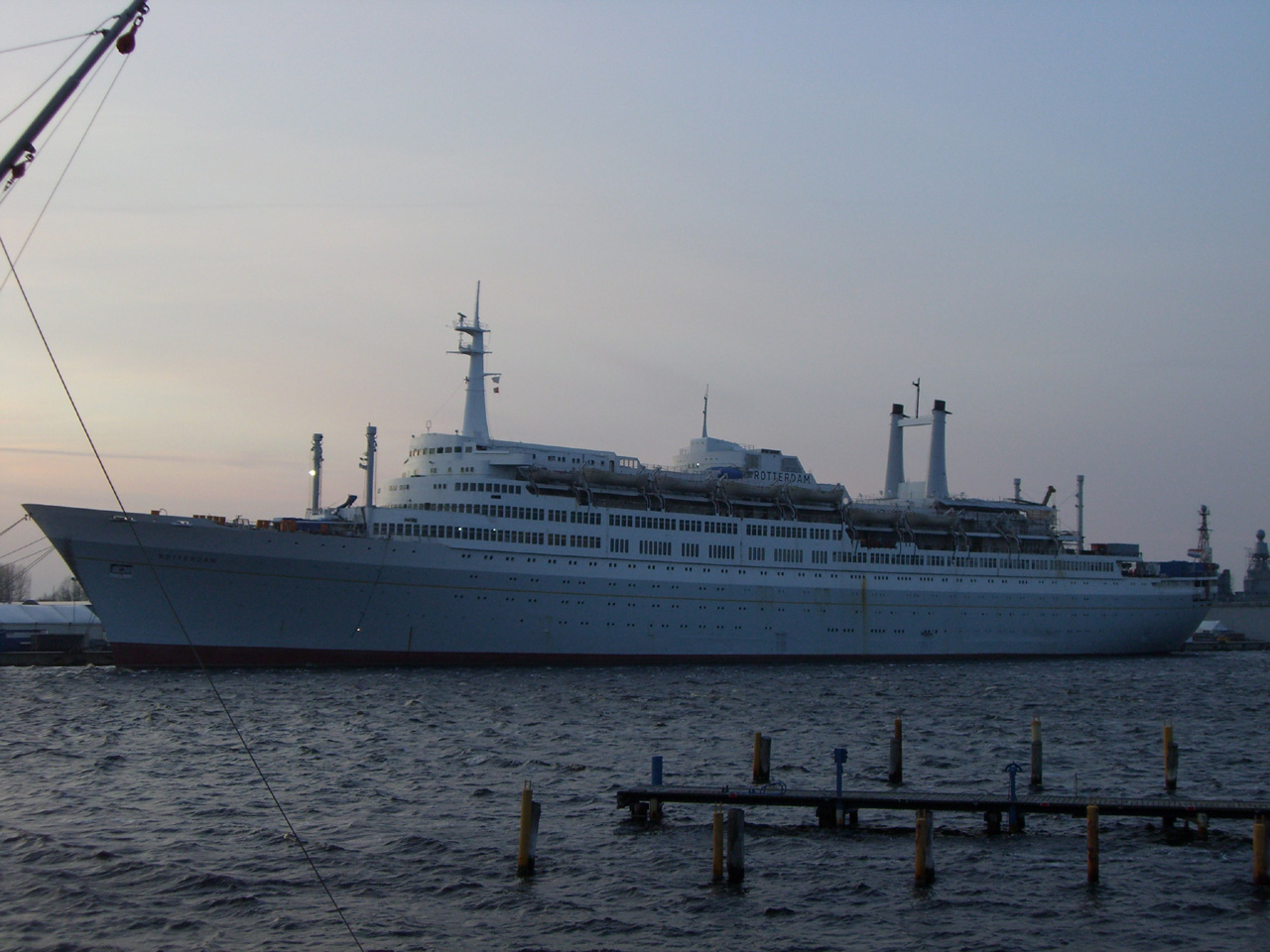
Rotterdam (V) was introduced as HAL's new flagship in 1958.

It is estimated that nearly 200 people were killed in wartime sinkings of HAL ships. The largest loss of life occurred in November 1942 when U-174 sank Zaandam (II), taking 135 souls. In January 1941, 39 souls were lost when MV Beemsterdijk struck a mine. More casualties occurred during the sinking of MV Bliderdijk by U-38 in October 1940, U-564's sinking of Maasdam (III) in 1941, and the sinking of SS Pennland during the German invasion of Greece. Another U-boat sinking occurred in September 1942, when MS Breedijk was sunk by U-34. Allied forces inflicted losses on board MV Drechtdijk during an air raid after she had been captured by German forces.

=== Post-war era ===
After the war, HAL transported a large wave of emigrants from the Netherlands to Canada and elsewhere. The Rotterdam to Hoboken route continued to serve Southampton, but by 1948 the port of Boulogne was still unable to resume handling large ocean liners. Instead, from February 1948 Nieuw Amsterdam (II) started calling at Le Havre. At first she was the only HAL ship to do so. Veendam (II) made intermediate calls at Southampton only, and Noordam (II) and Westerdam (I) ran direct between Rotterdam and Hoboken. By 1959, Holland America ships were also calling at Cobh, Quebec and Montreal. By 1963, they also served Bremerhaven.

Holland America's second house flag, in use from 1971 to 1988.

In 1958 Holland America launched Rotterdam (V), who quickly replaced Nieuw Amsterdam (II) as the new Dutch ship of state. Equipped for both two-class transatlantic service and one-class luxury cruising, her distinctive architecture and modern interior design placed her among the most innovative ships of the era. However, by the late 1960s, air travel began to displace transatlantic liner crossings. Nieuw Amsterdam (II) operated the line's final scheduled transatlantic service in 1971 as the line pivoted to cruising exclusively. To coincide with this change, the line introduced a new dark blue hull color for the entire fleet and rebranded the line's house flag for the first time in its history.

In 1973, the line introduced its first purpose-built cruise ship with Prinsendam (I) and retired Nieuw Amsterdam (II). Through the line's 1971 acquisition of Westours, an Alaskan tour group, HAL's cruise schedule increasingly prioritized sailings throughout the Pacific Northwest. Rebranded as Holland America Line-Westours, the company built multiple hotels throughout Alaska and acquired the Rocky Mountaineer train line. In 1978, the line reincorporated in the United States and moved its headquarters to Stamford, Connecticut. New purpose-built cruise ships followed in the 1980s, including running mates Nieuw Amsterdam (III) and Noordam (III). In the late 1980s, the line introduced a new house flag and logo featuring a depiction of Nieuw Amsterdam (II) with Henry Hudson's Halve Maen. An iteration of this logo still exists today as the line's modern logo.

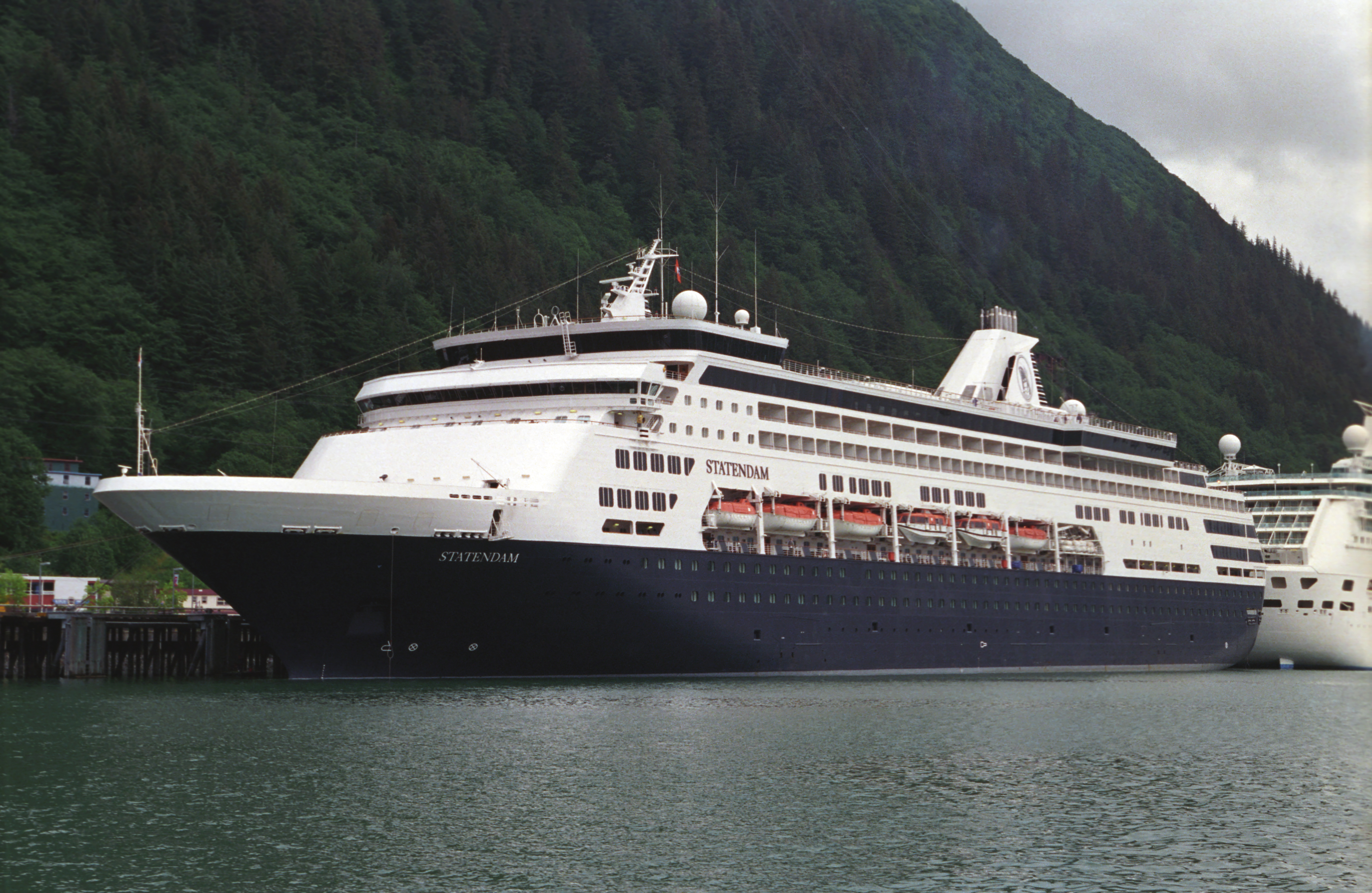
Statendam (V) was the first ship built under Carnival Corporation ownership.

After relocating to Seattle, Washington, the company diversified into luxury cruising through an acquisition of Windstar Cruises in 1988. In that same year, Holland America purchased the struggling Home Lines and renamed the MS Homeric to Westerdam (II). In 1989, Carnival Corporation purchased the entire organization for 1.2 billion guilders. The former Dutch owners used the proceeds of the sale to establish the HAL Trust and HAL Investments, both of which are owned by the van Der Vorm family. The logo for these organizations is the line's original tri-band NASM house flag.

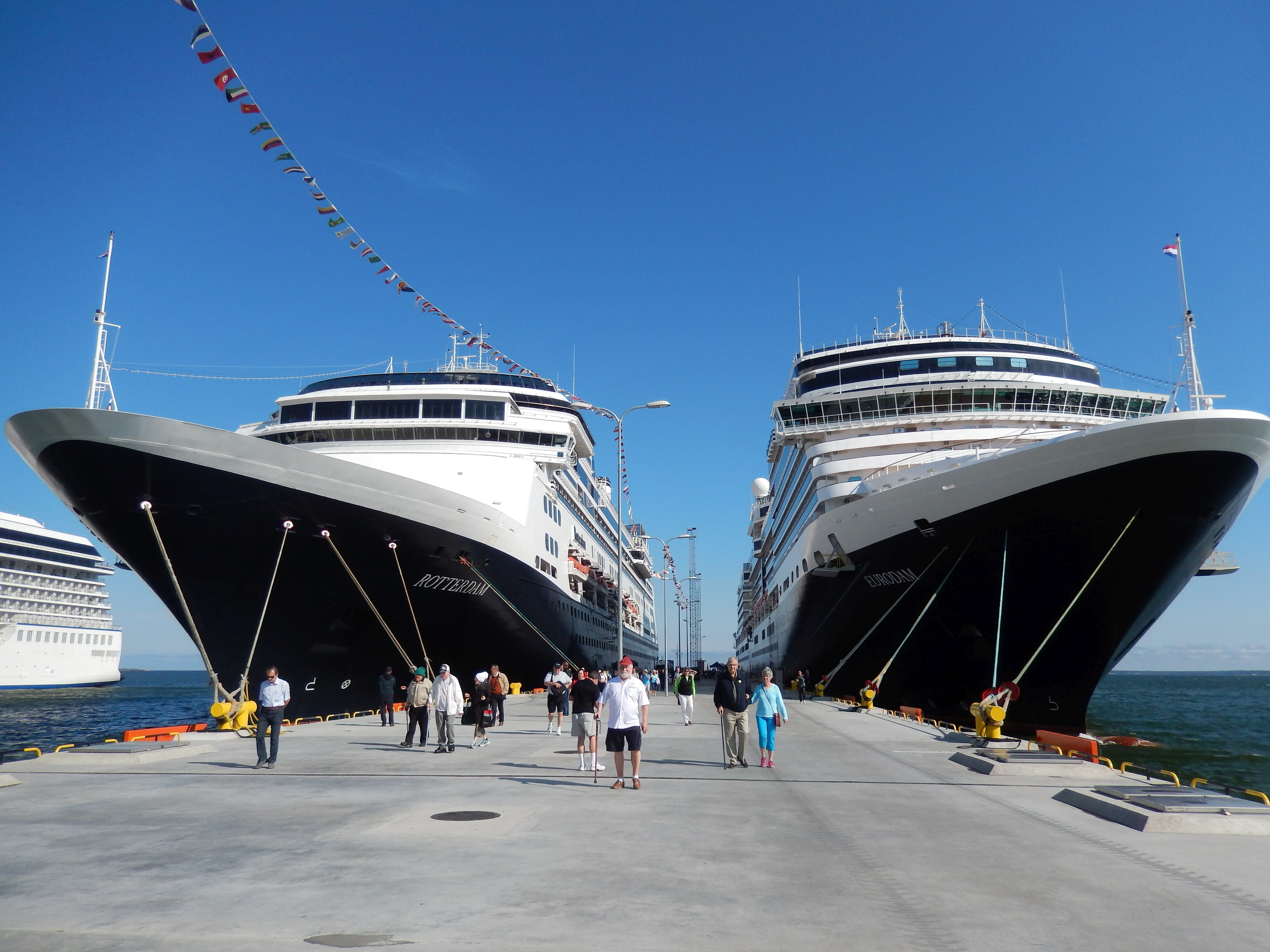
Rotterdam (VI) and Eurodam (I) docked alongside in Tallinn, Estonia in 2014.

=== US-based cruise line (1989–present) ===
After being acquired by Carnival Corporation, HAL received a significant cash injection to overhaul and lengthen the newly acquired Westerdam (II). A quartet of new purpose-built ships was ordered from Fincantieri in Italy, the first of which entered service in 1993 as the 55,000 GRT Statendam (V). To much surprise, Carnival Corporation chose not to invest in the popular flagship Rotterdam (V), selling her to Premier Cruise Lines in 1997. Another quartet of new-build ships soon followed, dramatically increasing HAL's overall capacity. The first ship in the class was the 61,000 GRT Rotterdam (VI), who enjoyed co-flagship status with running mate Amsterdam (I). Both ships were distinguished by unique twin-uptake funnels designed to evoke Rotterdam (V).

In 1996, the line acquired Little San Salvador Island in The Bahamas for $6 million from Norwegian Cruise Line. After spending over $16 million in renovations and renaming the island to Half Moon Cay, the island opened to HAL and Carnival passengers as a private destination island. At the turn of the century, the line began to sell older tonnage including Nieuw Amsterdam (III) in 2000 and Westerdam (II) in 2001. Noordam (II) was bareboat chartered to Thomson Cruises in 2002 but remained under Holland America ownership until being sold in 2018. At around this time, the company's name reverted to Holland America Line. The Vista-class quartet of ships entered service starting with Zuiderdam (II) in 2002. Each of the four ships features a verandah stateroom ratio of 67% and twin funnels. The slightly enlarged Signature class entered service with Eurodam (I) in 2008 and Nieuw Amsterdam (IV) in 2010. In 2015, one year before the introduction of the Pinnacle class, the first Carnival-commissioned ships left the fleet starting with Statendam (V) and Ryndam (III). In 2018, HAL acquired another rail line, the White Pass and Yukon Route between Skagway and Whitehorse. In 2019, the line's smallest ship Prinsendam (II) was sold to German tour group Phoenix Reisen.

During the COVID-19 pandemic, Zaandam (III) and Rotterdam (VI) made international headlines due to large numbers of infected passengers, causing them both to be denied passage through the Panama Canal. Both ships were eventually granted passage, returning to Port Everglades, Florida after conducting ship-to-ship transfers of healthy passengers to isolate infected guests. In July 2020, HAL announced that four ships would leave the fleet, amongst which included co-flagships Rotterdam (VI) and Amsterdam (I), Maasdam (V), and Veendam (IV). This reduction in force left the Zaandam (III) and Volendam (III) as the only remaining small ships in the fleet. Due to the sale of the sixth Rotterdam, the in-progress Ryndam (IV) was renamed to Rotterdam (VII), eventually entering service in 2020.

In 2029, HAL will acquire a fifth Vista-class, the Arcadia from P&O Cruises, with the ship expected to under go a full evolution before its debut.

== Fleet ==
=== Current fleet ===
| Ship name | In HAL service | Gross tonnage | Maximum speed | Passenger complement | Enclosed passenger decks | Flag | Image |
Rotterdam class (R class)
| MS Volendam | 1999 | 61,214 | 23 knots | 1,432 | 9 | Netherlands | |
| MS Zaandam | 2000 | 61,396 | 23 knots | 1,432 | 9 | Netherlands | |
Vista class (V class)
The four Vista class ships are named for the points of the compass in Dutch.
| MS Zuiderdam | 2002 | 82,305 | 24 knots | 1,916 | 10 | Netherlands | |
| MS Oosterdam | 2003 | 82,305 | 24 knots | 1,916 | 10 | Netherlands | |
| MS Westerdam | 2004 | 82,305 | 24 knots | 1,916 | 10 | Netherlands | |
| MS Noordam | 2006 | 82,318 | 24 knots | 1,924 | 10 | Netherlands | |
Signature class
The Signature class ships are an enlarged Vista class design.
| MS Eurodam | 2008 | 86,273 | 23.9 knots | 2,104 | 11 | Netherlands | |
| MS Nieuw Amsterdam | 2010 | 86,700 | 23.9 knots | 2,106 | 11 | Netherlands | |
Pinnacle class
The Pinnacle class ships are the largest in the line's history.
| MS Koningsdam | 2016 | 99,863 | 22.2 knots | 2,650 | 12 | Netherlands | |
| MS Nieuw Statendam | 2018 | 99,863 | 22.2 knots | 2,650 | 12 | Netherlands | |
| MS Rotterdam | 2021 | 99,863 | 22.2 knots | 2,650 | 12 | Netherlands | |

=== Future fleet ===
| Ship name | In HAL service | Gross tonnage | Maximum speed | Passenger complement | Enclosed passenger decks | Flag | Image |
Vista class (V class)
| TBA | 2029 | 84,342 | 22 knots | 1,952 | 11 | Netherlands | |

=== Former fleet ===
| Ship name | Built | In HAL service | Gross tonnage | Current flag | Notes | Image |
|---|---|---|---|---|---|---|
| Amsterdam | 2000 | 2000–2020 | 62,735 tons | Netherlands | Sold to Fred. Olsen Cruise Line in 2020 and renamed Bolette. | |
| Rotterdam | 1997 | 1997–2020 | 61,849 tons | Netherlands | Sold to Fred. Olsen Cruise Line in 2020 and renamed Borealis. | |
| Veendam | 1996 | 1996–2020 | 57,092 tons | Greece | Sold to Seajets in 2020 and renamed Aegean Majesty. | |
| Ryndam | 1994 | 1994–2015 | 55,819 tons | Greece | Transferred to P&O Cruises Australia in 2015 and renamed Pacific Aria. | |
| Maasdam | 1993 | 1993–2020 | 55,575 tons | Bermuda | Sold to Seajets in 2020 and renamed Aegean Myth. | |
| Statendam | 1993 | 1993–2015 | 55,819 tons | United Kingdom | Transferred to P&O Cruises Australia in 2015 and renamed Pacific Eden. | |
| Prinsendam | 1988 | 2002–2019 | 38,848 tons | (The Bahamas) Bahamas | Sold to Phoenix Reisen in 2019 renamed Amera. | |
| Westerdam | 1986 | 1988–2002 | 54,763 tons | Malta | Transferred to Costa Cruises in 2002 and renamed Costa Europa. | |
| Noordam | 1984 | 1984–2005 | 33,960 tons | Malta | Bareboat chartered to Thomson Cruises and renamed Thomson Celebration; sold in 2018. | |
| Nieuw Amsterdam | 1983 | 1984–2000 | 33,930 tons | Malta | Sold to American Classic Voyages in 2000 and renamed Patriot; reacquired in 2002 and sold to Louis Cruises and renamed Spirit. | |
| Rotterdam | 1959 | 1959–1997 | 38,645 tons | Netherlands | Sold to Premier Cruise Lines in 1997 and renamed Rembrandt; now a museum and hotel in Rotterdam. | |
| Veendam | 1958 | 1972–1984 | 14,984 tons | | Sold to Bermuda Star Line in 1984 and renamed Bermuda Star. | |
| Volendam | 1957 | 1972–1984 | 14,208 tons | | Sold to American Hawaii Cruises in 1984 and renamed Island Sun. | |
| Statendam | 1956 | 1956–1982 | 24,294 tons | | Sold to Paquet Cruises in 1982 and renamed Rhapsody. | |
| Prinsendam | 1973 | 1973–1980 | 8,566 tons | | Caught fire and sank off Yakutat, Alaska in 1980. | |
| Ryndam | 1950 | 1950–1973 | 15,015 tons | | Sold to Epirotiki Lines in 1973 and renamed Atlas. | |
| Nieuw Amsterdam | 1937 | 1937–1973 | 36,982 tons | | Sold to Nan Fung Steel Enterprise for scrap in 1973. | |
| Maasdam | 1952 | 1952–1968 | 15,015 tons | | Sold to Polish Ocean Lines in 1968 and renamed Stefan Batory. | |
| Westerdam | 1940 | 1946–1965 | 12,149 tons | | Sold to Cía Española de Demolición Naval S.A. for scrap in 1965. | |
| Noordam | 1938 | 1938–1963 | 10,726 tons | | Sold to Cielomar S.A. in 1963 and renamed Oceanien. | |
| Aagtedijk | 1945 | 1950–1963 | 7,646 tons | | Sold to N.V. IJzerhandel Hollandia for scrap in 1963. | |
| Groote Beer | 1944 | 1952–1963 | 9,190 tons | | Sold to the Latsis Group in 1963 and renamed Marianna IV. | |
| Waterman | 1945 | 1951–1963 | 9,176 tons | | Sold to the Latsis Group in 1963 and renamed Margareta. | |
| Zuiderkruis | 1944 | 1951–1963 | 9,178 tons | | Sold to the Royal Netherlands Navy in 1963. | |
| Dongedyk | 1929 | 1929–1963 | 10,220 tons | | Sold to Toshing Trading Co. Ltd. for scrap in 1963. | |
| Damsterdyk | 1930 | 1930–1963 | 10,155 tons | | Sold to Belvientes Compañia Naviera S.A. for scrap in 1963. | |
| Veendam | 1923 | 1923–1953 | 15,450 tons | | Sold to Patapsoo Scrap Co. for scrap in 1953. | |
| Volendam | 1922 | 1922–1951 | 15,434 tons | | Sold to N.V. Frank Rijsdijk's Industrieële Ondernemingen for scrap in 1951. | |
| Breedijk | 1922 | 1922–1942 | 6,861 tons | | Sunk by U-68 in 1942. | |
| Zaandam | 1938 | 1938–1942 | 10,909 tons | | Sunk by U-174 in 1942. | |
| Maasdam | 1921 | 1921–1941 | 8,812 tons | | Sunk by U564 in 1941. | |
| Beemsterdijk | 1922 | 1922–1941 | 6,869 tons | | Struck a mine and sank in 1941. | |
| Westernland | 1918 | 1939–1940 | 16,479 tons | | Transferred to the UK Ministry of War Transport in 1940. | |
| Pennland | 1922 | 1939–1940 | 16,381 tons | | Destroyed during the German Invasion of Greece. | |
| Bilderdijk | 1922 | 1922–1940 | 6,856 tons | | Sunk by U-38 in 1940. | |
| Drechtdijk | 1923 | 1932–1940 | 9,338 tons | | Captured by Nazi Germany in 1940; sunk by Allied shelling in 1945. | |
| Burgerdijk | 1921 | 1921–1940 | 6,853 tons | | Sunk by U-48 in 1940. | |
| Boschdijk | 1922 | 1922–1940 | 6,872 tons | | Captured by Nazi Germany in 1940; sunk as a target ship in 1942. | |
| Dinteldijk | 1922 | 1922–1940 | 9,399 tons | | Captured by Nazi Germany in 1940; scuttled as a block ship in 1944. | |
| Statendam | 1929 | 1929–1940 | 29,511 tons | | Destroyed during the Battle of Rotterdam. | |
| Rotterdam | 1908 | 1908–1940 | 24,149 tons | | Sold to N.V. Frank Rijsdijk's Industrieële Ondernemingen for scrap in 1940. | |
| Binnendijk | 1921 | 1921–1939 | 6,873 tons | | Struck a mine and sank in 1939. | |
| Spaarndam | 1922 | 1922–1939 | 8,857 tons | | Struck a mine and sank in 1939. | |
| Veendijk | 1914 | 1914–1933 | 6,874 tons | | Sold to N.V. Frank Rijsdijk's Industrieële Ondernemingen for scrap in 1933. | |
| Westerdijk | 1913 | 1913–1933 | 8,261 tons | | Sold to P. & W. MacLellan Ltd. for scrap in 1933. | |
| Nieuw Amsterdam | 1905 | 1905–1932 | 16,967 tons | | Sold to Torazo Hashimoto for scrap in 1932. | |
| Gaasterdijk | 1922 | 1922–1931 | 8,373 tons | | Sold to VNS in 1931 and renamed Gaassterkerk. | |
| Grootendijk | 1923 | 1923–1931 | 8,365 tons | | Sold to VNS in 1931 and renamed Grootenkerk. | |
| Rijndam | 1901 | 1901–1929 | 12,527 tons | | Sold to N.V. Frank Rijsdijk's Industrieële Ondernemingen for scrap in 1929. | |
| Noordam | 1902 | 1902–1927 | 12,531 tons | | Sold to N.V. Frank Rijsdijk's Industrieële Ondernemingen for scrap in 1928. | |
| Beukelsdijk | 1916 | 1916–1923 | 6,749 tons | | Struck rocks and sank in 1923. | |
| Maartensdijk | 1909 | 1909–1923 | 6,483 tons | | Sold to the Ben Line in 1923 and renamed Benvrackie. | |
| Noorderdijk | 1913 | 1913–1917 | 4,546 tons | | Sunk by U-21 in 1917. | |
| Zaandijk | 1899 | 1909-1917 | 4,546 tons | | Sunk by U-21 in 1917. | |
| Blommersdijk | 1907 | 1916 | 4,835 tons | | Sunk by U-53 in 1916. | |
| Potsdam | 1899 | 1900–1915 | 12,606 tons | | Sold to Swedish America Line in 1915 and renamed Stockholm. | |
| Statendam | 1898 | 1898–1911 | 10,475 tons | | Sold to Allan Line in 1911 and renamed Scotian. | |
| Rotterdam | 1897 | 1897–1906 | 8,139 tons | | Sold to Scandinavian American Line in 1906 and renamed C.F. Tietgen. | |
| Veendam | 1871 | 1888–1898 | 4,036 tons | | Struck submerged wreck and sank in 1898. | |
| P. Caland | 1874 | 1874–1897 | 2,584 tons | | Sold to Fratelli Cosulich in 1897 and renamed Ressel. | |
| Rotterdam | 1886 | 1886–1895 | 3,361 tons | | Sold for scrap in 1895. | |
| Edam | 1883 | 1883–1895 | 3,130 tons | | Sank in a collision in 1895. | |
| Leerdam | 1881 | 1882–1889 | 2,334 tons | | Sank in a collision in 1889. | |
| W.A. Scholten | 1874 | 1874–1887 | 2,589 tons | | Sank in a collision in 1887. | |
| Rotterdam | 1872 | 1873–1883 | 1,694 tons | | Sank near Schouwen in 1883. | |

== See also ==
- Carnival Corporation & plc
- Private island
