= SS Rotterdam (1872) =

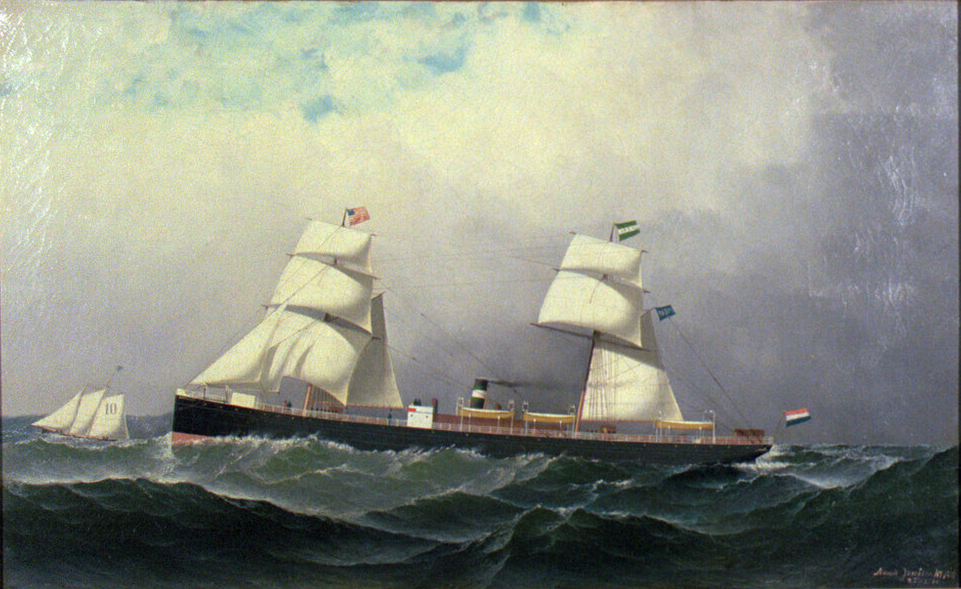
The Rotterdam in 1877, painted by Antonio Jacobsen

SS Rotterdam was a Dutch 19th-century ocean-going steamer. She was built in 1872 by the Henderson, Coulborn and Company shipbuilding firm. The ship ran aground and sunk on the Zeehondenbank near the Dutch island of Schouwen, while she was travelling from New York, United States to Rotterdam, The Netherlands.

== Construction ==
Rotterdam was constructed in 1872 at the Henderson, Coulborn and Company shipyard in Renfrew, Scotland, United Kingdom. She was completed in 1872 and launched on 6 June 1872. She was named Rotterdam after the Dutch city of the same name.

The ship was 81.8 metres (268 ft 4 in) long, with a beam of 10.7 metres (35 ft 1 in) and had a depth of 8.7 metres (28 ft 7 in). The ship was assessed at 1,694 GRT and had 2 decks. She had a four-cylinder quadruple expansion engine driving a single screw propeller but she could also use her ten sails for propulsion. The engine was rated at 1,300 indicated horsepower (970 kW).

== Career ==
She commenced her maiden voyage on 15 October 1872, sailing from Rotterdam, the Netherlands to New York, United States, via Plymouth, United Kingdom. On board were 10 Cabin class passengers, 60 emigrants and 600 tons of cargo. The crossing was made in 14 days and 6 hours. This was also the first voyage of an own ship for the company. The ship left New York on 5 November 1872 to return to Rotterdam.

=== The Boston Forger escape ===
Some excitement occurred on 28 January 1876 when The New York Times reported that the well-known "Boston Forger" Mr. E. D. Winslow, had escaped from the United States to Holland by taking passage on the Rotterdam. He had his family (3 persons), a bankers draft for 3,700 Dutch Guilders and $200,000 in gold coins with him. He was followed by two detectives but they only traced him to the Holland America docks by the time the ship had sailed. As the United States had no extradition treaty with the Netherlands, his escape was complete.

=== The 1879 incident ===
On 29 November 1879 the New York Herald reported that the arrival of the ship created quite a stir as she arrived minus her foremast and her steerage quarters completely wrecked. The ship had left Rotterdam on 8 November 1879 and should have arrived, with good weather, in New York on 20 November. Some ferocious weather had caused considerable damage to the ship and had resulted in a delay of six days as she docked on 26 November 1879. There were no reports about any casualties.

=== New boilers ===
In early 1883 the ship was refurbished and new boilers installed at the yard of the Nederlandsche Stoomboot Maatschappij in Rotterdam. (2,040 Brt.) This improved the fuel consumption considerably. The ship returned to service but only made a few crossings.

== Sinking ==
On 26 September 1883, Rotterdam was on her 65th voyage from New York to Rotterdam when she ran ashore on the Zeehondenbank near the Dutch island of Schouwen. All 56 passengers survived the incident and were evacuated from the ship by the Zierikzee (a local fishing vessel, adapted for use as a lifeboat) and landed safely ashore. The crew arrived shortly after having been transferred to the tugboat Nieuwesluis which had been sent out after the stranded ship had sent out a request. Later on a second tugboat, the Hellevoetsluis was dispatched. However, the ship was sitting so high up on the bank that very little could be done.

Then the weather turned for the worse and the abandoned ship broke into two pieces on 12 October 1883 due to the pounding waves building up over the sandbank. Eventually the hull disappeared under the sea. Those items that could be salvaged were sold by public auction on 29 October 1883.
