= USS Maartensdijk =

Cargo steamship that served in the US Navy in the First World War

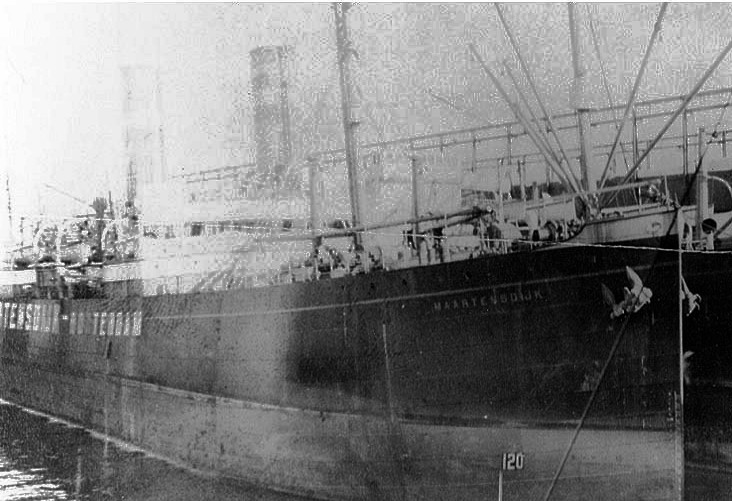
- The ship as Maartensdijk in NASM colors

History
- Name: 1902: Egyptiana; 1902: Rapallo; 1909: Maartensdijk; 1923: Benvrackie; 1927: Ani
- Owner: 1902: British Maritime Trust; 1902: Rob. M. Sloman; 1904: Gulf Line; 1906: Hamburg America Line; 1908: Gulf Line; 1909: Holland America Line; 1918: NOTS; 1919: Holland America Line; 1923: Ben Line Steamers; 1927: Cie. Internationale de Commerce et d'Armement
- Operator: 1918: (United States) US Navy; 1923: Wm Thomson & Co; 1927: M Gumuchdjian
- Port of registry: 1902: (German Empire) Hamburg; 1904: (United Kingdom) West Hartlepool; 1906: (German Empire) Hamburg; 1908: (United Kingdom) West Hartlepool; 1909: (Netherlands) Rotterdam; 1924: (United Kingdom) Leith; 1927: (Belgium) Antwerp
- Builder: Furness, Withy, Middleton
- Yard number: 261
- Launched: 12 March 1902
- Completed: 14 May 1902
- Acquired: by US Government, 20 March 1918
- Commissioned: into US Navy, 28 March 1918
- Decommissioned: 25 February 1919
- Identification: 1902: code letters RMNH; 1904: UK official number 115130; 1904: code letters WBRG; 1906: code letters RPCM; 1908: UK official number 115130; 1908: code letters HMKL; 1909: code letters PJSD; 1924: UK official number 115130; 1924: code letters KPWC; 1927: code letters MALC
- Fate: Scrapped in 1933

General characteristics
- Type: Cargo ship
- Tonnage: 6,483 GRT, 3,360 NRT, 9,241 DWT
- Displacement: 13,000 tons
- Length: 400.5 ft (122.1 m)
- Beam: 52.1 ft (15.9 m)
- Draught: 28 ft 6 in (8.69 m)
- Depth: 29.3 ft (8.9 m)
- Decks: 2 + shelter deck
- Installed power: 489 NHP, 2,800 ihp
- Propulsion: 1 × screw; 1 × triple-expansion engine
- Speed: 11 1/2 knots (21.3 km/h)
- Capacity: 452,000 cu ft (12,800 m^{3}) grain; 411,000 cu ft (11,600 m^{3}) bale
- Complement: 113
- Armament: in US Navy: 1 × 6-inch/50-caliber gun; 1 × 3-inch/50-caliber gun
- Notes: sister ship: Como

USS Maartensdijk was a cargo steamship that was laid down in England in 1902 as Egyptiana, but launched as Rapallo. She served in the United States Navy as USS Maartensdijk from 1918 until 1919, with the Naval Registry Identification Number ID-2497.

She passed through various German, British, Dutch and Belgian owners, including Hamburg America Line (HAPAG), Holland America Line (NASM), Ben Line, and two subsidiaries of Furness, Withy. She was renamed Maartensdijk in 1909, Benvrackie in 1923 and Ani in 1927. She was scrapped in Italy in 1933.

== Building ==
Furness, Withy owned both a shipyard and several shipping companies. In 1901 its shipyard on the River Tees in Middleton, Hartlepool, England laid down a pair of ships for a Furness, Withy subsidiary called the British Maritime Trust. Yard number 261 was laid down as Egyptiana, and a sister ship was laid down as yard number 262.

Before the ships were launched, the German company Rob. M. Sloman agreed to buy both of them. Number 261 was launched on 12 March as Rapallo, and completed on 14 May. Number 262 was launched on 23 April as Como, and completed that July.

Rapallo's registered length was 400.5 ft (122.1 m), her beam was 52.1 ft (15.9 m) and her depth was 29.3 ft (8.9 m). Her tonnages were 6,483 GRT, 3,360 NRT and 9,241 DWT. Her holds had capacity for 452,000 cubic feet (12,800 m^{3}) of grain, or 411,000 cubic feet (11,600 m^{3}) of baled cargo.

Rapallo had a single screw, driven by a three-cylinder triple-expansion steam engine built by Richardsons Westgarth & Company of Hartlepool. It was rated at 489 NHP or 2,800 ihp, and gave her a speed of 11 1/2 knots (21.3 km/h).

Rob. M. Sloman registered Rapallo at Hamburg. Her code letters were RMNH.

== Changes of owner in the 1900s ==
In August 1904 a different Furness, Withy subsidiary called Gulf Line Ltd acquired Rapallo from Rob. M. Sloman, and registered her at West Hartlepool. Her United Kingdom official number was 115130 and her code letters were WBRG. Gulf Line traded between the UK and the west coast of South America, and Sir Christopher Furness wanted the company to trade with Australia as well. However, he faced stiff competition, combined with poor trading conditions in Australia.

On 17 March 1906 HAPAG acquired Rapallo from Gulf Line and registered her at Hamburg. Her code letters were RPCM. On 21 March 1908 Gulf Line bought Rapallo back from HAPAG, and registered her at West Hartlepool. Her code letters were HMKL.

In April 1909 NASM acquired Rapallo from Gulf Line, renamed her Maartensdijk, and registered her in Rotterdam. Her code letters were PJSD.

== US Navy service ==
On 20 March 1918 the United States Customs Service seized Maartansdijk under angary at New York. The next day she was transferred to the US Navy, who commissioned her on 28 March as USS Martinsdijk (ID 2497). She was assigned to the Naval Overseas Transport Service Army Account. She was fitted with one 6-inch/50-caliber gun and one 3-inch/50-caliber gun as defensive armament.

Maartensdijk made four transatlantic round trips between the US and France to supply the American Expeditionary Forces: three before the Armistice of 11 November 1918, and one after. For her first trip she loaded Army cargo, and on 10 April 1918 departed in convoy to France via Halifax, Nova Scotia. She reached Saint-Nazaire on 14 May, discharged her cargo, and on 15 June she started her return trip to the US. Her subsequent voyages were from New York and Boston.

Maartensdijk's fourth and final transatlantic voyage with the US Navy began from Boston on 12 December 1918. After discharging her cargo in France, she loaded Army supplies to be returned to the US. On 9 February 1919 she reached New York, where on 25 February she was simultaneously decommissioned, transferred to the United States Shipping Board, and returned to NASM.

== Changes of owner in the 1920s ==
By 1921 Maartensdijk was equipped for wireless telegraphy. On 10 December 1923 Ben Line Steamers bought her, renamed her Benvrackie, and registered her at Leith. Her code letters were KPWC. At the time, she was one of the largest ships in Ben Line's fleet, which traded mainly between the UK and the Far East. She was the first of five Ben Line ships to be called Benvrackie.

In February 1927 the Compagnie Internationale de Commerce et d'Armement acquired Benvrackie, renamed her Ani, and registered her at Antwerp. Her code letters were MALC, and M Gumuchdjian was her manager.

From 25 April 1932 Ani was laid up at Antwerp. In 1933 she was sold for scrap. That April she arrived at Trieste in Italy to be broken up.

== Bibliography ==
- Blake, George (1956). The Ben Line. London, Edinburgh: Thomas Nelson and Sons Ltd.
- Burrell, David (1992). Furness Withy 1891–1991. Kendal: World Ship Society. ISBN 0-905617-70-3.
- Lloyd's Register of British and Foreign Shipping. Vol. I.–Steamers. London: Lloyd's Register of Shipping. 1903 – via Internet Archive.
- Lloyd's Register of British and Foreign Shipping. Vol. I.–Steamers. London: Lloyd's Register of Shipping. 1907 – via Internet Archive.
- Lloyd's Register of British and Foreign Shipping. Vol. I.–Steamers. London: Lloyd's Register of Shipping. 1910 – via Internet Archive.
- Lloyd's Register of British and Foreign Shipping. Vol. II.–Steamers. London: Lloyd's Register of Shipping. 1921 – via Internet Archive.
- Lloyd's Register of British and Foreign Shipping. Vol. II.–Steamers and Motorships. London: Lloyd's Register of Shipping. 1927 – via Internet Archive.
- Mercantile Navy List. London. 1906 – via Crew List Index Project.
- Mercantile Navy List. London. 1909 – via Crew List Index Project.
- Mercantile Navy List. London. 1925 – via Crew List Index Project.
