= Flag of Rotterdam =

Flag of the city of Rotterdam

Rotterdam
- Use: Municipal flag
- Proportion: 2:3
- Adopted: February 10, 1949; 77 years ago
- Design: A white stripe in the green field
- Flag with coat of arms
- Proportion: 2:3
- Design: A white stripe in the green field with the coat of arms of Rotterdam in the centre

The flag of Rotterdam, the second-largest city in the Netherlands, was adopted 10 February 1949. It is a horizontal triband of green-white-green. This colour combination is also found in the coat of arms of Rotterdam. In addition to the official one, a variant of the same three equal-sized stripes is also widely used, but with the image of the coat of arms of Rotterdam on the flag. The ratio is 2:3.

The green and white colours have been used to represent the city since the Middle Ages, but the employment of the flag of Rotterdam has varied greatly. The green refers to the Court of Wena and the white symbolises the Rotte river.

== Historical flags ==
The colours green and white have been the colours of Rotterdam since the Middle Ages, but the number of stripes on Rotterdam flags varied greatly. The green refers to the Court of Wena and the white symbolises the Rotte. Ships with Rotterdam as their home port flew the Rotterdam flag in one or two masts at sea.

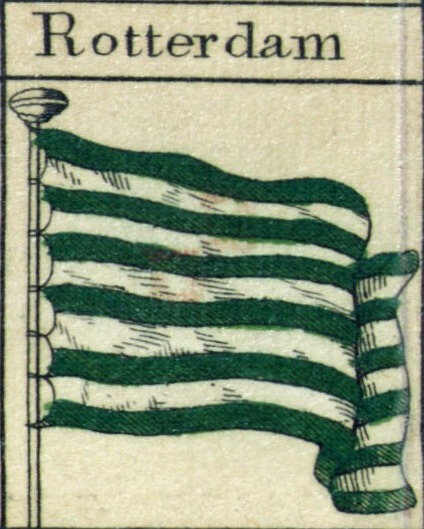
Flag of Rotterdam, as it was drawn on a flag chart in 1783

Reconstruction from a flag chart in 1783
