= Kemp House (disambiguation) =

The Kemp House is New Zealand's oldest building.

Kemp House may also refer to:

- Wascom House, in Hammond, Louisiana, NRHP-listed, also known as Kemp House
- Kemp Place, Reading, Massachusetts, NRHP-listed house, with Kemp Barn, also NRHP-listed
- John Wolf Kemp House, Colonie, New York, NRHP-listed
- Lewis Kemp House, Dayton, Ohio, NRHP-listed
- Kemp-Shepard House, Georgia, Vermont, NRHP-listed
- John and Margarethe Kemp Cabin, Mazomanie, Wisconsin, NRHP-listed

== See also ==
- Kemp & Hebert Building, Spokane, Washington, NRHP-listed
