= John Stephens Graham =

American lawyer and government official (1905–1976)

John Graham
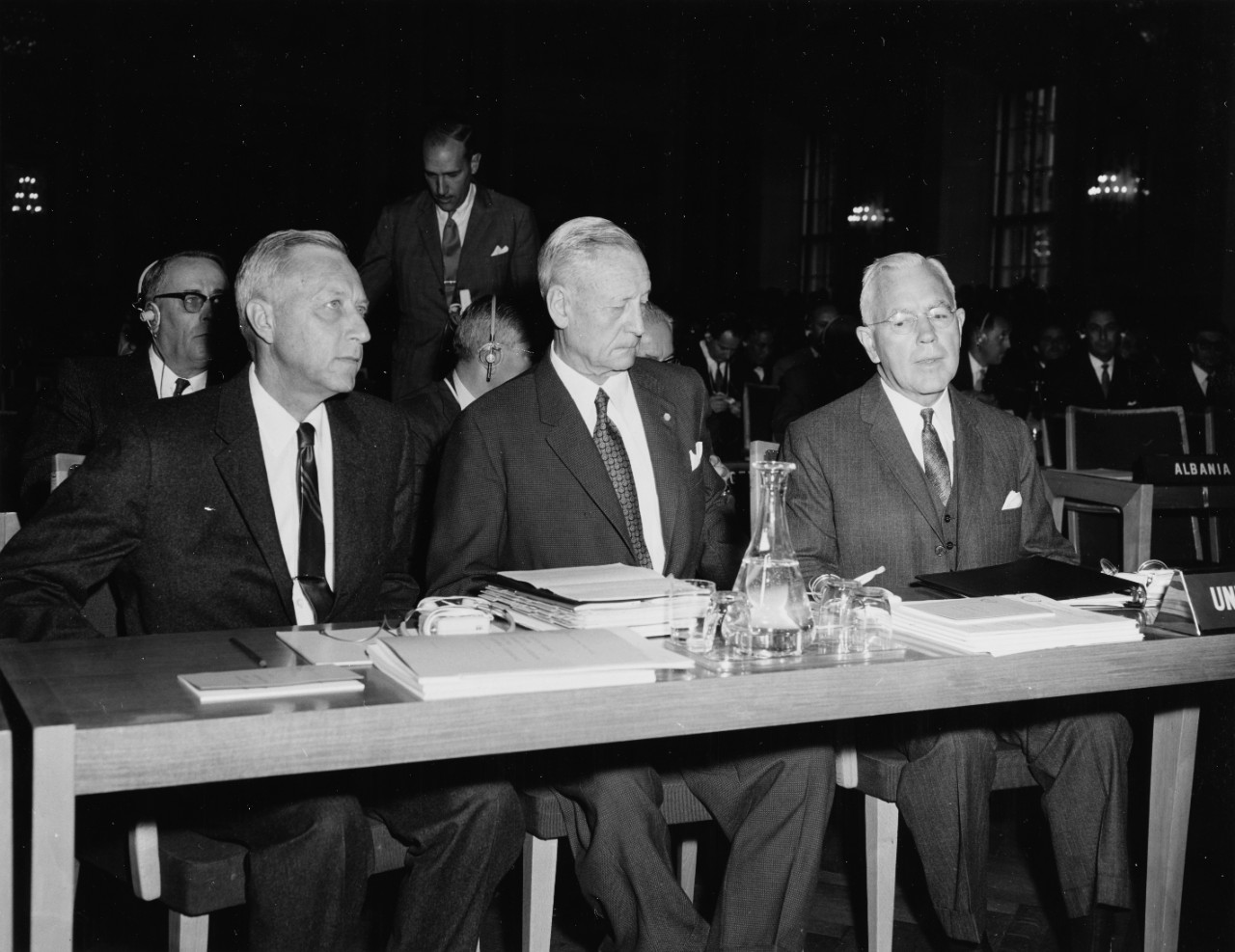
- Graham (left) with Paul F. Foster (center) and John A. McCone, 1960

Commissioner of Internal Revenue
- In office November 19, 1952 – January 19, 1953
- President: Harry S. Truman
- Preceded by: John Dunlap
- Succeeded by: Justin Winkle (Acting)

Personal details
- Born: John Stephens Graham; August 4, 1905 Reading, Massachusetts, U.S.
- Died: October 20, 1976 (aged 71) Washington, D.C., U.S.
- Party: Democratic
- Spouse: Elizabeth Foster Breckinridge
- Children: 4
- Relatives: Margaret Nowell Graham (mother); Katherine G. Howard (sister); Henry S. Breckinridge (father-in-law); Margaret Mitchell (cousin)
- Education: University of North Carolina, Chapel Hill (BA); Harvard University; University of Virginia (LLB)

John Stephens Graham (August 4, 1905 – October 20, 1976) was a Washington, D.C., attorney and political appointee. He was an Assistant Secretary of the Treasury, and commissioners for the Internal Revenue Service and Atomic Energy Commission.

== Early life and education ==
Graham was born August 4, 1905, in Reading, Massachusetts, (Note: Derby states that Graham was born in Reading, Massachusetts, as does the family census records.) son of Joseph L. Graham, a R.J. Reynolds Tobacco Company executive, and Margaret Nowell Graham, an artist. His older sister was Katherine G. Howard, an Eisenhower administration official. He was a cousin of Margaret Mitchell, the author of Gone With the Wind.

Graham graduated from the University of North Carolina at Chapel Hill and attended Harvard Law School before graduating from University of Virginia School of Law with close friend Frank Wisner.

== Career ==
During World War II, Graham served in the United States Navy.

Graham served as Assistant Secretary of the Treasury during the second term of President Harry S. Truman and Secretary of the Treasury John Wesley Snyder. He served as the 30th Commissioner of Internal Revenue from November 19, 1952, until January 19, 1953.

After Dwight D. Eisenhower became president in 1953, Graham became a financial and business consultant in Washington, D.C., until 1956, when he served as national treasurer for Volunteers for Stevenson, the campaign to elect Adlai Stevenson President of the United States, against incumbent President Eisenhower.

On September 12, 1957, when Graham was 51, he was appointed as a commissioner of the U.S. Atomic Energy Commission by Eisenhower, and as a delegate to the International Atomic Energy Agency. The President, along with partisan Lewis Strauss, both Republicans, appointed Graham, a Democrat, to fill out John von Neumann's term following Neumann's death. This was done as a show of conciliation between the President and the Joint Committee Graham served as a commissioner on the commission until June 30, 1962.

== Personal life ==
He married Elizabeth Foster Breckinridge (1911–2005), daughter of Henry S. Breckinridge and Ruth Bradley Woodman Breckinridge. (Note: During World War II, Ruth Breckinridge traveled via the SS Maasdam for England, where she was to work in London at a hospital as a house mother to Red Cross nurses. On June 27, 1941, the ship was attacked by a Nazi submarine near Iceland. Mrs. Breckinridge was lost at sea. In memory of her mother, Elizabeth Graham donated a family Concord, New Hampshire, residence to the Red Cross. Until early 2005 it was the Red Cross' Concord headquarters. (Note: The Washington Post article states that Ruth Breckinridge was lost at sea on June 26, 1941, but the official sources state the ship was hit on June 27th.)) Elizabeth's father was the United States Assistant Secretary of War under Woodrow Wilson, and was a member of the prominent Breckinridge family. She was born in Monterey, Pennsylvania, grew up in Washington, D.C., and Bethesda, Maryland, and was a 1933 graduate of Vassar College. (Note: Elizabeth and her father were familiar with the Charles Lindbergh family. In 1927 Lindbergh gave her her first airplane ride. Colonel Henry S. Breckinridge was made counsel for Lindbergh following the kidnapping of his young son.) She was a tutor, teacher and founder of an after-school program, Tuesday School.

Graham and his wife lived in Winston-Salem, N.C. before moving to Washington, D.C., in 1942 where Graham served in the Navy. The couple had four daughters:

- Katherine Graham
- Louise Graham
- Margaret "Polly" Graham, who married Joseph Coreth (1937–2014)
- Susan Graham

Graham died on October 20, 1976, in Washington, D.C. His wife, Elizabeth, lived until October 25, 2005, when she died following a heart attack. Both are buried in New London, NH.

== Notes ==
Subnotes

Government offices
Preceded by John B. Dunlap	Commissioner of Internal Revenue; 1952–1953	Succeeded by Justin F. Winkle; Acting
