= Margaret Nowell Graham =

American artist (1867–1942)

- Born: Margaret Nowell; 1867; Lowell, Massachusetts, US
- Died: 1942; Winston-Salem, North Carolina, US
- Resting place: Salem Cemetery, Winston-Salem, North Carolina; 36.091648°N 80.239485°W
- Education: Boston Museum School of Fine Art
- Known for: Watercolor painter of flowers and landscapes

Margaret Nowell Graham (1867–1942) was an American artist who painted watercolors of flowers and landscapes. She was the mother of two national political figures Katherine G. Howard, Secretary of the Republican Party and advisor to President Dwight D. Eisenhower, and John Stephens Graham, Assistant Secretary of the Treasury.

== Early life ==
Margaret Nowell was born in Lowell, Massachusetts, in 1867 to Charles Foster Nowell and Anna Marie Chase. She studied at the Boston School of the Museum of Fine Arts. She was a member of the Boston Art club and the American Federation of Arts.

== Art ==
Graham made watercolor paintings of landscapes and flowers from Marblehead, Massachusetts, and Winston-Salem, North Carolina. Her specialty was landscape with architectural interest. Her works were recognized in New England and in the South, including first prize in the North Carolina Federation of Women's Club Arts Competitions in 1923, 1924 and 1925. Her paintings are at the Pennsylvania Academy of Fine Arts Reynolda House Museum of American Art, Wake Forest University, and in private collections.

She made a watercolor painting in 1922 of the Reynolda House that was used on notecards and sold at the Reynolda House Museum. It also appeared on the cover of the Fall 2002 edition of the Wake Forest Alumni Magazine. A 1922 watercolor of the barn appeared on the front page of the Summer 2013 edition of Magnolia magazine, published by the Southern Garden History Society. Graham was a member of the Southern States Art League.

== Personal life ==
Margaret Nowell married Joseph L. Graham, transportation manager for R.J. Reynolds Tobacco Company. Their children were:

- Gregory Nowell Graham (1896-1932)
- Katherine Graham (1898-1986), who became the Secretary of the Republican National Committee and Deputy Administrator of the Federal Civil Defense Administration, and married Charles P. Howard (1887–1967) in 1921
- Joseph Lewis Graham, Jr (1903-1905)
- John Stephens Graham (1905-1976), who became the Assistant Secretary of the Treasury under Harry S. Truman, and married Elizabeth Foster Breckinridge (1901–2005)

She died on March 31, 1942, and is buried at the Salem Cemetery in Winston-Salem, North Carolina. In her honor, there is a Margaret Nowell Graham Art Fund for high school students, managed by the Winston-Salem Foundation with awards to students at the Sawtooth School for Visual Art. In addition, there is a Margaret Nowell Graham Memorial Lecture Fund at the Peabody Essex Museum in Salem, Massachusetts.
