= Alfred D. Jones (architect) =

American architect (1872–1915)

- Born: 26 July 1872; Chicago, Illinois, U.S.
- Died: 22 March 1915 (aged 42); San Diego, California, U.S.
- Occupation: Architect
- Practice: Private practice, Partnerships with Isaac J. Galbraith, Alonzo J. Grover, and Joseph T. Levesque
- Buildings: Jones House (1909), Kemp & Hebert Building (1908), Kemp, Charles J. and Maud, House (1908), Kempis Apartments (1906), Weaver House (1910), F.T. Van Ness House (1906), J.C. Holmes House (1906), Ortho Dorman House (1907), Standard Furniture Store (1907), Nagie Block (1908), Postel Building (1908), Fairmont Hotel (1909), Espanola Apartments (1909), Frederick Building (1909), F.J. Klein House (1910), Tokyo Apartments (1910), Union Park Methodist Episcopal Church (1910), J.E. Horton Public Market (1910), First Baptist Church (1910), Wilson & Lemon Livery Stable (1911)

Alfred David Jones (July 26, 1872 – March 22, 1915) was an American architect, who worked in Spokane, Washington. He is noteworthy for designing a variety of single-family homes, commercial buildings, and apartment complexes. Among the buildings he designed, the Jones House (1909), the Kemp & Hebert Building (1908), the Kemp, Charles J. and Maud, House (1908), the Kempis Apartments (1906), and the Weaver House (1910) are listed on the Spokane Register of Historic Properties.

== Biography ==
Born in Chicago, where his father, David Albie Jackson Jones, owned and managed a brick factory, Alfred D. Jones worked as an apprentice for W.W. Boyington & Company from about 1888 to 1894. He married Lillian V. Ashfield (1875–1964) on the 6th of November 1895 in Chicago. Their first child was born in 1896. The family of three remained in Chicago until the autumn of 1899 when they moved to Spokane.

From 1900 to 1901 he was employed as a draftsman by the prominent architect Albert Held (1866–1924). By 1903 Jones was in a partnership, lasting less than a year, with the architect Isaac J. Galbraith (1859–1926), who designed several of Spokane's noteworthy buildings.

After the termination of the partnership with Galbraith, Jones was in private practice without any partner (until 1908) and designed, among other buildings, the F.T. Van Ness House (1906), the J.C. Holmes House (1906), and the Ortho Dorman House (1907). Apart from his projects for Charles Kemp, Jones also designed the Standard Furniture Store (1907); the Nagie Block (1908); the Postel Building (1908); the Fairmont Hotel (1909); the Espanola Apartments (1909); and the Frederick Building (1909).

In 1908 he formed a partnership with the architect Alonzo J. Grover — this 1908 partnership also lasted less than a year. Particularly noteworthy, in design and in religious use as the residence of three successive Roman Catholic bishops, is the Jones House (1909).

In 1910 Jones went into partnership with the architect Joseph T. Levesque (1878–1932). This last partnership produced in Spokane a number of buildings, including the F.J. Klein House (1910); the Tokyo Apartments (1910); the Union Park Methodist Episcopal Church (1910); the J.E. Horton Public Market (1910); the First Baptist Church (1910); and the Wilson & Lemon Livery Stable (1911). By the end of 1910, Alfred D. Jones had contracted tuberculosis and, for health reasons, moved to Hermosillo, Mexico in January 1911, but he remained there only for a brief time. Records indicate that his wife Lillian remained in Spokane. Alfred D. Jones moved, by 1913, to Arizona and then, in 1914, to San Diego. There he died in March 1915 at age 42 from pulmonary tuberculosis.

Alfred D. Jones was a pioneer of Spokane's movie theater business and had a financial interest in Spokane's first moving picture show house, the Scenic Theater. In its beginning years, the theater, designed by Jones, showed movies on some nights and vaudeville shows on some nights. Jones served as secretary and treasurer of the Spokane Scenic Theater Company. Later, he promoted the Arcade Amusement Company of which he was president. The company built Spokane's Arcade and Empress Theaters.

Among buildings designed by Jones, the Kemp & Hebert Building and the Weaver Houser were added to the National Register of Historic Places (NRHP) in 1994 and 2002, respectively.

Alfred D. Jones was not a relative of the financier and real estate developer Arthur D. Jones (who founded Spokane's first real estate company).

According to the 1910 United States Census, Alfred and Lillian Jones were the parents of four children, but in 1910 two of the children were dead. The two surviving children were Alfred David Henry Jones (born in 1896) and Harold Jones (born in 1906). Alfred David Henry Jones registered in Spokane for conscription in 1917–1918. In 1942 he lived in the Davenport Grand Hotel and worked for the U.S. Army Corps of Engineers.
