= MV Zaandam =

Dutch cargo ship sunk by a U-boat in 1942

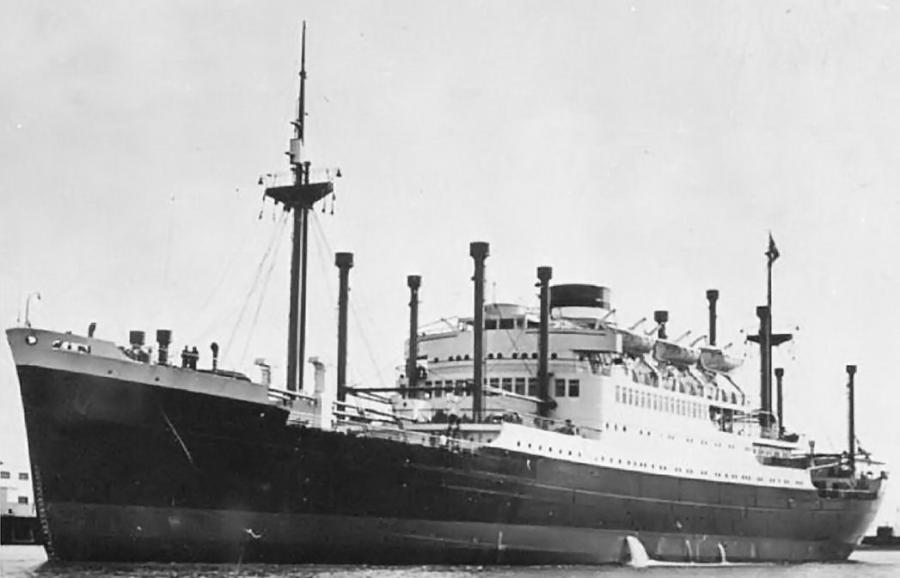
- Zaandam

History

Netherlands
- Name: Zaandam
- Namesake: Zaandam
- Owner: NASM
- Operator: Holland America Line
- Port of registry: Rotterdam
- Builder: Wilton-Fijenoord, Schiedam
- Yard number: 663
- Laid down: 22 December 1937
- Launched: 27 August 1938
- Completed: 21 December 1938
- Identification: call sign PIVK
- Fate: Torpedoed and sunk, 7 November 1942

General characteristics
- Type: Cargo ship
- Tonnage: 10,909 GRT, 6,365 NRT, 10,312 DWT
- Length: 480.7 ft (146.5 m)
- Beam: 64.4 ft (19.6 m)
- Draft: 31 ft 8 in (9.65 m)
- Depth: 36.2 ft (11.0 m)
- Decks: 3
- Installed power: 3,359 NHP, 12,500 ihp
- Propulsion: 2 × screws; 2 × two-stroke diesel engines
- Speed: 18 knots (33 km/h)
- Capacity: passengers: 160; cargo: 515,000 cu ft (14,600 m^{3}) grain; 478,000 cu ft (13,500 m^{3}) bale; 16,832 cu ft (476.6 m^{3}) refrigerated
- Crew: 1942: 112 + 18 Armed Guards
- Sensors & processing systems: wireless direction finding; echo sounding device
- Armament: in Second World War: DEMS
- Notes: sister ship: Noordam

MV Zaandam was a Dutch cargo liner. It was one of a pair of motor ships built for Holland America Line (Nederlandsch-Amerikaansche Stoomvaart Maatschappij, or NASM) in 1938. In 1942 a U-boat sank her, causing the deaths of 135 of her passengers and crew. 164 people survived, including three who drifted on a life raft for 83 days before being rescued.

This was the second NASM ship to be named after the city of Zaandam in North Holland. The first was a steamship that was built in 1882, and sold and renamed in 1897.

== Building ==
NASM had a pair of sister ships built by different shipyards in 1937–38. Machinefabriek en Scheepswerf van P. Smit Jr. in Rotterdam built Noordam, launching her in April 1938 and completing her that September. Dok- en Werf Maatschappij Wilton-Fijenoord in Schiedam built Zaandam as yard number 663. She was laid down on 22 December 1937, launched on 27 August 1938, and completed on 21 December 1938.

Zaandam's registered length was 480.7 ft (146.5 m), her beam was 64.4 ft (19.6 m) and her depth was 36.2 ft (11.0 m). Her tonnages were 10,909 GRT, 6,365 NRT and 10,312 DWT. She had berths for 160 passengers, all of the same class, and every passenger cabin had its own ensuite bathroom. Her holds had capacity for 515,000 cubic feet (14,600 m^{3}) of grain, or 478,000 cubic feet (13,500 m^{3}) of baled cargo. 16,832 cubic feet (476.6 m^{3}) of her holds were refrigerated.

Zaandam had twin screws, each driven by an MAN six-cylinder, double-acting two-stroke diesel engine. The combined power of her twin engines was rated at 3,359 NHP or 12,500 ihp, and gave her a speed of 18 knots (33 km/h).

Zaandam's navigation equipment included wireless direction finding and an echo sounding device. NASM registered her at Rotterdam. Her wireless telegraph call sign was PIVK.

== Second World War service ==
In May 1940 Germany conquered the Netherlands. NASM ships that were not destroyed or captured in the invasion joined the Allied war effort. In December 1941 the USA declared war on Japan and Germany, and in February 1942 the US Government created the War Shipping Administration (WSA) to take overall charge of merchant shipping. Zaandam was placed under WSA control, and 18 United States Navy Armed Guards were added to her 112 crew to man her defensive armament.

On 13 July 1942 Zaandam left New York in Convoy AS 4. This rendezvoused in the North Atlantic with Convoy WS 21P from the Firth of Clyde, and the merged convoy continued to Freetown, Sierra Leone. Zaandam continued unescorted via Aden to Suez in Egypt, where she arrived on 2 September 1942.

== Loss ==
Zaandam returned via Beira in Portuguese Mozambique and Cape Town in South Africa. She was carrying 6,000 tons of copper and chromite, and 600 tons of general cargo. Her Master was Captain Jan Wepster, who had been in command of the NASM liner Volendam when she survived being torpedoed in August 1940. In Cape Town, Zaandam embarked 169 passengers. Nearly all were survivors from merchant ships that U-68, U-159 and U-172 had sunk off the South African coast between 7 and 9 October: the US steamships Chickasaw City, Firethorn, Coloradan, and Examelia, and the Panamanian motorship Swiftsure. As many as six passengers were crowded into some of her two-berth cabins.

Zaandam crossed the South Atlantic, bound for New York. At 18:17 hrs on 2 November she was about 300 nautical miles (560 km) north of Cape São Roque in northeastern Brazil, when U-174 hit her with one torpedo, which exploded on the port side of Zaandam's engine room. Her engines and steering gear were put out of action, and the decks and crew quarters above the engine room were destroyed. The crew prepared to abandon ship, and launched some of Zaandam's life rafts, but the ship stayed afloat, and Captain Wepster incorrectly decided that the explosion was not a torpedo, but that one of the diesel engines had blown a cylinder head. He ordered the crew out of the lifeboats. The US Navy Armed Guards gunnery officer, Ensign James Maddox ordered his men to battle stations. Captain Wepster argued with him, but the guards manned their guns on their own initiative.

At 18:28 hrs U-174 fired a second torpedo, which exploded between Zaandam's number two and three holds. She sank bow-first at position 1°25′N 36°22′W. The impact on the port side destroyed lifeboats 3 and 5. Zaandam's crew and passengers managed to launch lifeboats 1, 2 and 4. Boat number 2 capsized. Men, some of them wounded, had to jump overboard and try to swim to the boats and rafts. Sharks attacked some of the men in the water.

Several survivors in the water reached boat number 2 and righted it. In it they found the bodies of the Chief Engineer and a Javanese crewman. U-174 surfaced and questioned survivors in one of the boats. The U-boat commander wanted to know why Zaandam was carrying so many people, so he asked if she was a raider. A Second Officer, Kasper Karssen, replied that she was not, and explained that they were survivors from other torpedoed ships.

== Survivors in lifeboats ==
Survivors who had reached some of the rafts were transferred to the boats, along with any stores from the rafts. Boat number 2 was damaged and leaking, but its new occupants used it to search for and rescue other survivors, until 60 men were aboard. Attempts to stop the leaks were unsuccessful, so the occupants constantly bailed the boat.

On 7 November the Gulf Oil motor tanker Gulfstate found two boats and rescued their 106 occupants: 72 from boat number 1, commanded by Second Officer Karssen, and 34 from boat number 4, commanded by Second Officer Johannes de Lange. But the leaking boat number 2 had become separated from the others. Under the command of Second Officer Willem Broekhof, it reached the coast of Maranhão on 10 November, near the Preguiças River and town of Barreirinhas. Shortly after they landed, two of the men from the boat died.

With the help of a local fisherman, Broekhof, with Captain Mathews from Swiftsure, sailed a boat to the village of Pharo. There Broekhof borrowed a horse, which he rode to the nearest police station. From there he informed the British Consul in Barreirinhas, who relayed the news to the US Consul in Belém. The US Consul arranged for the survivors to be taken from the beach to São Luís, where they were hospitalised. After the survivors were discharged from hospital, the Norwegian cargo ship Banaderos took them from São Luís to Belém. From there they were flown via Miami to New York. The two dead men were buried at Barreirinhas.

== Survivors on a life raft ==
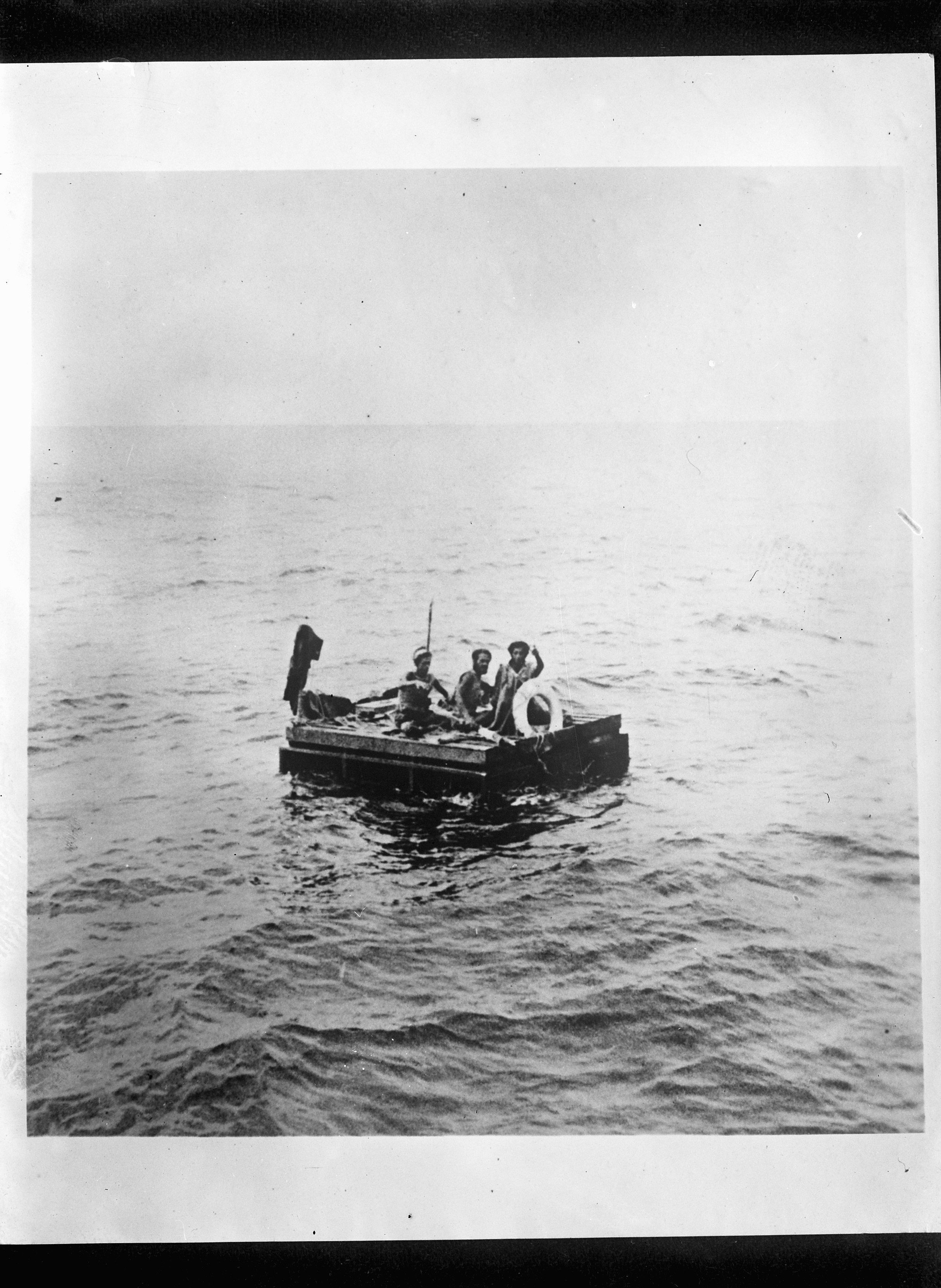
Cornelis van der Slot, Nicolaas Hoogendam and Basil Izzi on their life raft

The lifeboats failed to find one of the life rafts, which was crowded with 16 men. One of them, oiler Cornelis Van Der Slot, sighted an empty raft and swam to it. Over the next two hours, three other men from the crowded raft joined him.

One Armed Guard, Basil Izzi, survived in the water by clinging to floating wreckage. Whenever he found a piece of wreckage bigger than the one he was clinging to, he switched to it. After two nights and a day he saw the raft with four occupants, swam to it, and joined them. The occupant who pulled him from the water was Ensign Maddox.

The raft was rectangular, 8 by 10 feet (2 by 3 m). It was provisioned with 10 US gallons (38 L) of water, nine cans of condensed milk, 2 pounds (1 kg) of chocolate, and two dozen hardtack biscuits. The men found the hardtack made them thirsty, so they gave most of them to seabirds that settled on the raft. After 16 or 19 days the food ran out, and after 24 days the drinking water ran out. Three days later it rained hard, so the men caught rainwater by making a canvas trough.

After 20 days the men saw a ship. They burned flares and waved their shirts at the ship, but it did not respond. On the afternoon of the next day they saw another ship. The men burned three of their four remaining flares, and waved their shirts, but the ship did not respond. About three weeks later they saw another ship, but it was far away, and they did not try to signal to it.

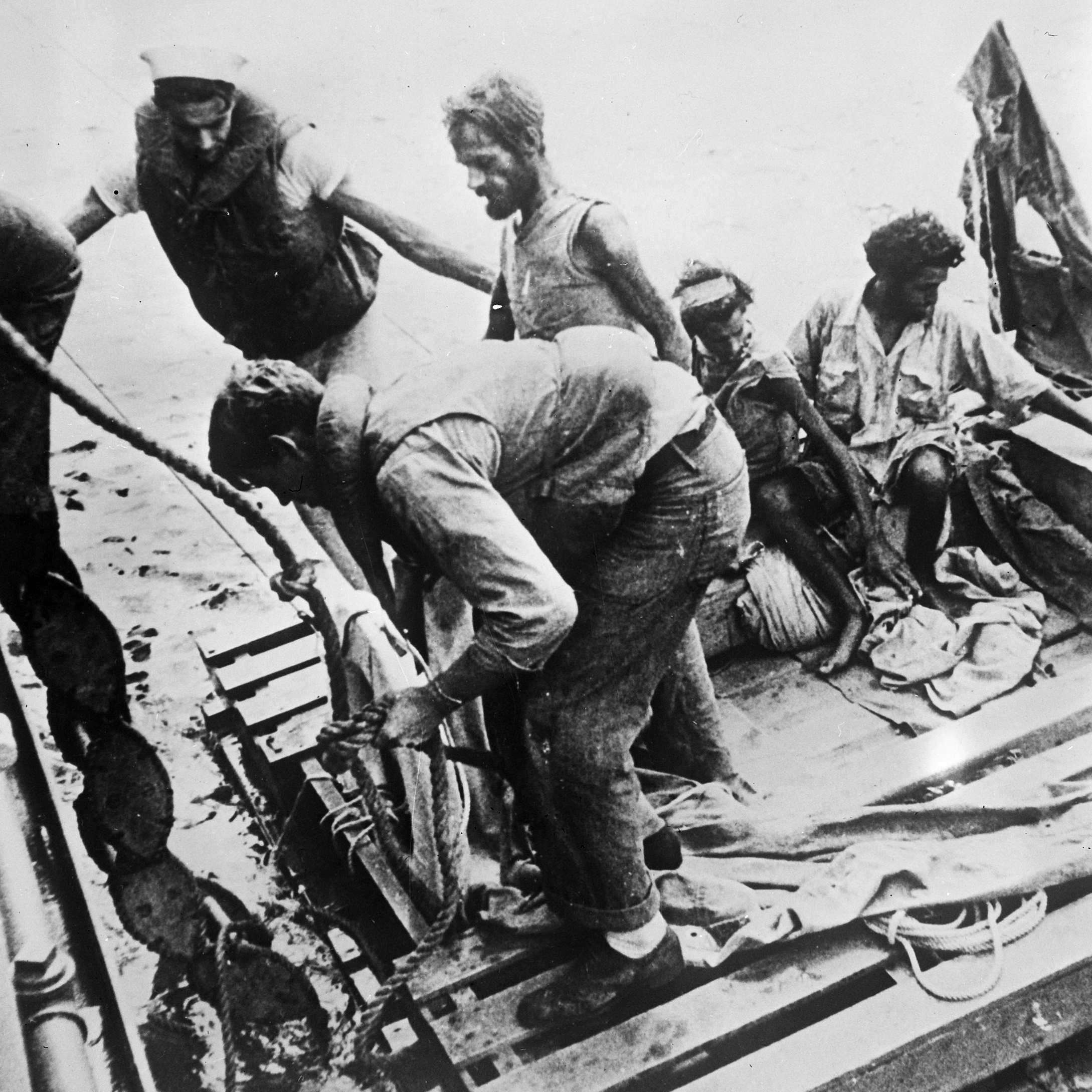
Crewmen of USS PC-576 (left) helping van der Slot (centre) out of the raft. Hoogendam and Izzi are sitting on the right.

The raft's provisions included a first aid kit. The men dismantled its scissors, fixed one of the scissor blades to the end of an iron rod to make a spear, and had some success spearfishing.

The raft had a 12-foot (4 m) rope. The men made it into a bowline, and dipped their hands and feet in the water to attract sharks. Eventually they lassoed a 4-foot (1.2 m) shark, drawing the bowline tight on its tail. They pulled it aboard the raft, tried to kill it by beating it to death, and then four men held the shark while the fifth knifed it. They ate its heart, liver and some of its meat. They tried storing some of its meat in a container, but by the next day it was inedible, so they threw the remains overboard.

The men caught and ate seabirds that alighted on the raft. On Thanksgiving Day, which that year was 26 November, a large bird alighted on the sea nearby. One of the Dutch survivors, Nicolaas Hoogendam, jumped into the sea and caught the bird, which the men then ate.

After 30 days, it was Izzi's 20th birthday. Eight small fish took refuge under the raft, where the men caught them through the cracks and ate them whole. After 42 days, it was Maddox' 30th birthday.

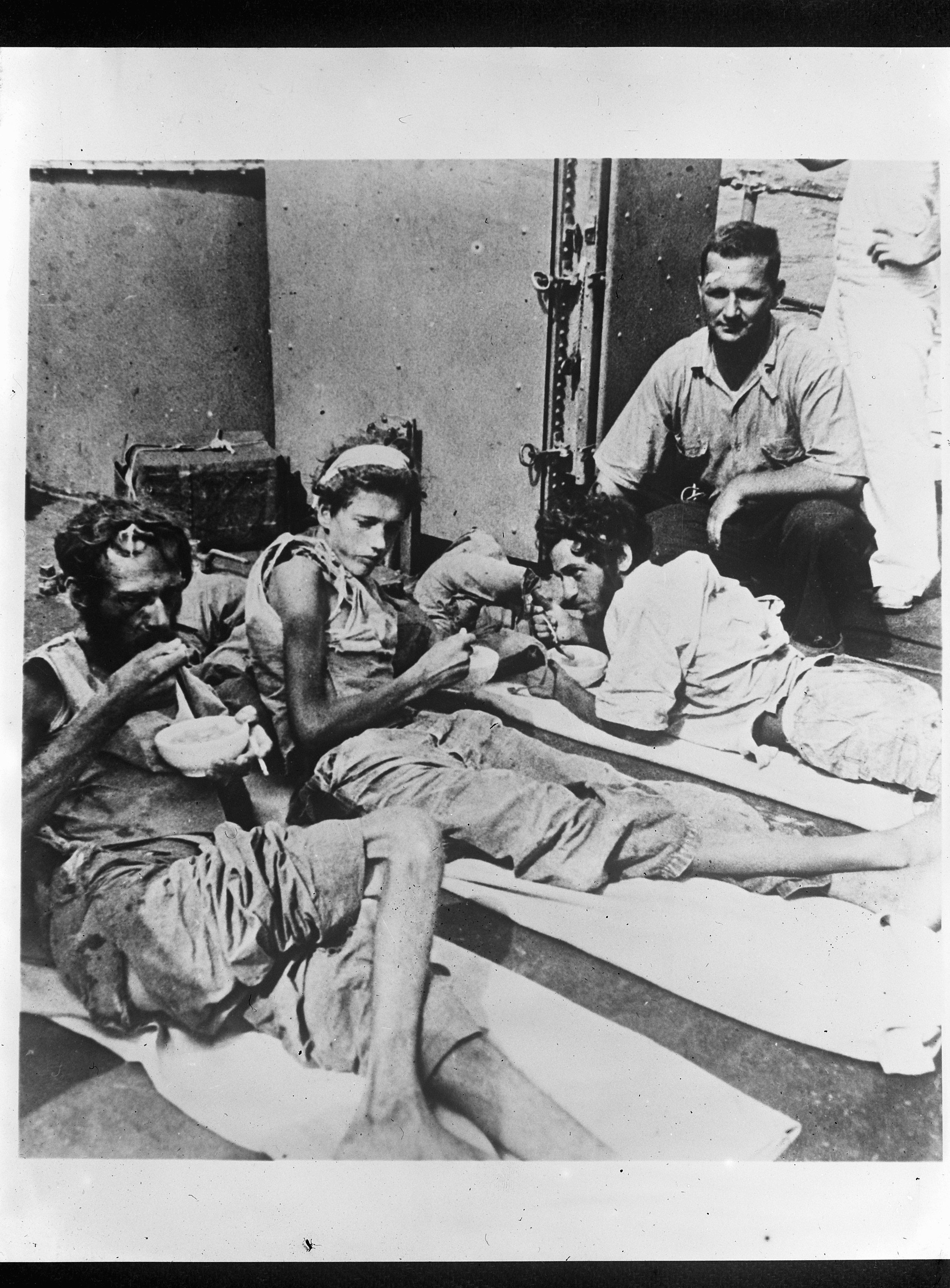
van der Slot, Hoogendam and Izzi aboard USS PC-576 after being rescued

After 60 days adrift, another Armed Guard on the raft, George Beezley, fell ill. He complained of stomach pains, went blind in one eye, then deaf in one ear, and after 66 days he died. Ensign Maddox, who in civilian life was a lecturer at Purdue University, conducted his burial at sea. After 69 days, they ran out of water again. After 73 days, Maddox also died. The three survivors buried him, saying prayers that he had taught them.

After 82 days, the three survivors saw an aircraft, but it went away without indicating its crew had seen them. On the morning of the 83rd day, 24 January 1943, they saw an aircraft again, and about an hour later a convoy appeared. It was Convoy TB-3 from Trinidad to Brazil. Izzi and Hoogendam held van der Slot's legs to help him stand up and wave to the nearest escort.

A lookout on one of the escorts, the submarine chaser USS PC-576, sighted the raft. PC-576 rescued the three surviving occupants: Van Der Slot, Izzi, and a seaman, Nicolaas Hoogendam. They were very malnourished, so at first they were fed only canned peaches. Izzi's weight had decreased from 145 lb (66 kg) to 85 lb (39 kg). They were landed at Recife in Pernambuco, where they were hospitalized for six weeks. From there they were flown via Miami to Washington, whence they were taken to Bethesda Naval Hospital in Maryland, from which they were eventually discharged.

== Aftermath ==
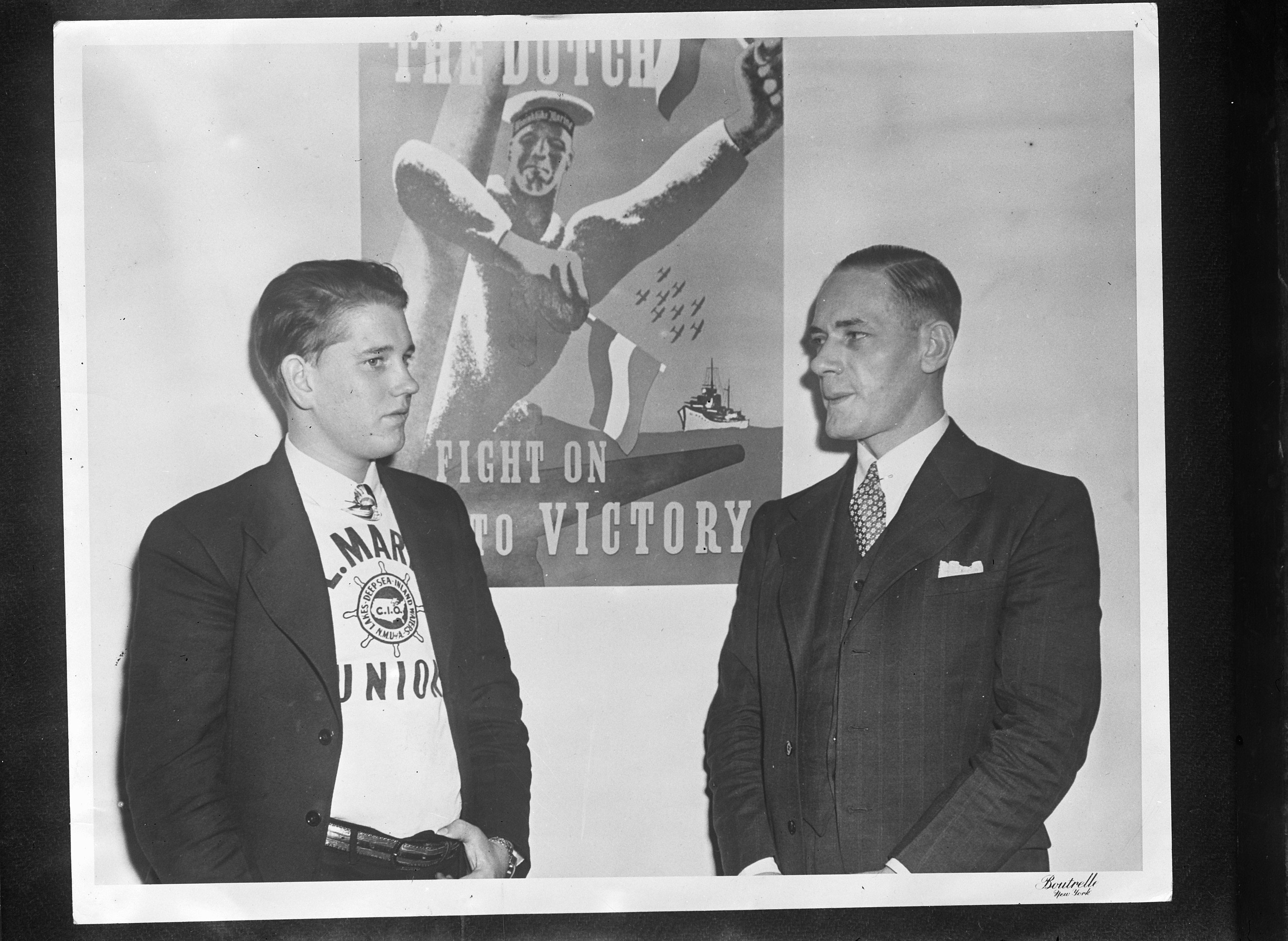
Hoogendam (left) and van der Slot (right) after being discharged from Bethesda Naval Hospital

On 18 November 1942, Basil Izzi's family was notified that he was missing. On 1 February 1943, the family was notified that he had been rescued. After his discharge from hospital, Izzi visited New York City. On 29 March Mayor Fiorello La Guardia received him at New York City Hall, after which Izzi visited to the Todd-Erie Basin shipyard in Brooklyn to meet shipyard workers in their lunch hour. On 6 April he took part in the dedication of the National Maritime Union Training School.

The Navy then gave him three days' leave to visit his parents. On 11 April he came home to a civic welcome in South Barre, Massachusetts. The US Navy then sent him on a two-month tour of the eastern and midwestern states of the US to visit defence manufacturing plants, speak to workers and incentivize them. He met senators and congressmen, and received a number of medals and commendations.

Cornelis van der Slot was awarded the Dutch Kruis van Verdienste ("Cross of Merit").

Izzi died in 1979. In 2015 a bridge that carries Massachusetts Route 32 over the Ware River near South Barre was renamed the "Seaman 2nd Class Basil D. Izzi Memorial Bridge" in his honor.

== Sister ship ==
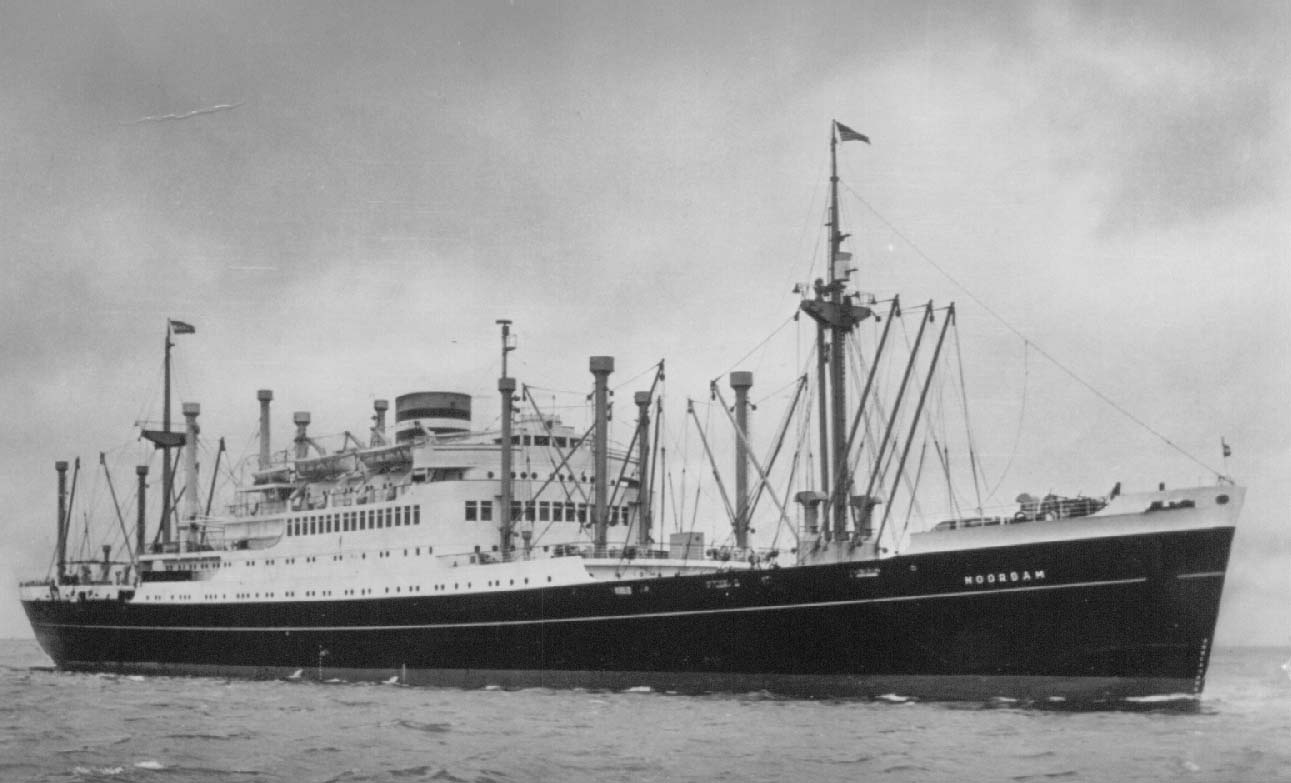
Zaandam's sister ship Noordam

Zaandam's sister ship Noordam survived the Second World War. In 1963 NASM sold her to Italian owners, who renamed her Oceanien and registered her in Panama. She was scrapped in Italy in 1967.

== See also ==
- SS Benlomond (1922)
- SS Maasdam (1920)

== Bibliography ==
- Haws, Duncan (1995). Holland America Line. Merchant Fleets series. Vol. 28. Uckfield: Travel Creatours Ltd Publications. ISBN 0946378258.
- "List of Vessels Fitted with Refrigerating Appliances". Lloyd's Register of Shipping (PDF). Vol. I. London: Lloyd's Register of Shipping. 1939 – via Southampton City Council.
- "Steamers & Motorships". Lloyd's Register of Shipping (PDF). Vol. II. London: Lloyd's Register of Shipping. 1939 – via Southampton City Council.
- Moore, Arthur R (1982). A Careless Word... A Needless Sinking. Farmington: Knowlton & McLeary.
- Top, Henk (2007). Bestemming New York. De bijzondere geschiedenis van ms Zaandam 1939–1942 (in Dutch). Zutphen: Walburg Pers. ISBN 978-9057305160.
