= Charles P. Howard (politician) =

American politician (1887–1966)

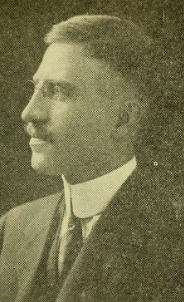

Chairman of the Massachusetts Commission of Administration and Finance
- In office 1925–1937
- Preceded by: Thomas W. White
- Succeeded by: Patrick J. Moynihan

Member of the Massachusetts House of Representatives for the 7th Middlesex district
- In office 1923–1927
- Preceded by: Gardner W. Pearson
- Succeeded by: Joseph R. Cotton

Personal details
- Born: December 26, 1887 Tewksbury, Massachusetts
- Died: July 2, 1966 (aged 78) Marblehead, Massachusetts
- Resting place: Laurel Hill Cemetery; Reading, Massachusetts
- Party: Republican
- Spouse: Katherine G. Howard (1921–1966; his death)
- Education: Harvard College; Harvard Law School
- Occupation: Lawyer

Charles Paglesen Howard (December 26, 1887 – July 2, 1966) was an American politician who was a member of the Massachusetts Senate and chairman of the state Commission of Administration and Finance.

== Early life ==
Howard was born on December 26, 1887, in Tewksbury, Massachusetts. His father, Dr. Herbert B. Howard, was superintendent of the Massachusetts State Infirmary, Massachusetts General Hospital, and Peter Bent Brigham Hospital. In 1908, Howard inherited Kemp Place in Reading, Massachusetts.

After attending Boston Latin School, Howard graduated from Harvard College in 1910 and Harvard Law School in 1914. During World War I, Howard was an officer with the I Corps and saw action in the Battle of Saint-Mihiel and the Meuse–Argonne offensive. He was discharged with the rank of major and continued his involvement with the military with the United States Army's Officers' Reserve Corps. In 1921 he married Katherine Graham, daughter of Margaret Nowell Graham and Joseph L. Graham, in Forsyth County, North Carolina. Graham's father did not approve of the marriage, which led to her being disinherited for a short period of time. Katherine G. Howard was also involved in politics and was elected secretary of the Republican National Committee in 1948.

== Political career ==
Howard was a delegate to the Massachusetts Constitutional Convention of 1917, but resigned to enter the Army. From 1923 to 1927, Howard represented the 7th Middlesex district in the Massachusetts Senate. He was a member of the rules, judiciary, state administration, mercantile affairs, and special joint coal investigating committees. In 1925, Howard was elected Reading's town moderator, a position he would hold for over three decades (with the exception of 1943–1946 when he was unavailable due to military service). He also served on the town's board of selectmen and board of overseers of the poor and was town counsel.

In 1925, Governor Alvan T. Fuller named Howard to be the third chairman of the state Commission of Administration and Finance. It was a position he had helped create in 1917 as a member of the Constitutional Convention. Howard also served as state budget commissioner until 1928, when, due to the commission's increased workload, Fuller chose to separate the two positions. Howard ran the state's administrative machine under five governors and was described by The Boston Globe as the "state's no man" because he rejected $750 million in expenditures during his 12 years in office. In 1937, the Democratic Governor Charles F. Hurley chose not to reappoint Howard, ending his tenure on the commission.

Howard was a candidate for Lieutenant Governor of Massachusetts in the 1938 election. He received 18.8% of the 8,888 votes in the Republican primary, losing to Horace T. Cahill who won in the fall and served from 1939 to 1945 as the 54th lieutenant governor of Massachusetts. Howard was treasurer of Middlesex County, Massachusetts from 1938 to 1954 and state commissioner of banks from 1954 to 1958. During his term as treasurer, 100% of county debt was paid off. During World War II, Howard served with the Army in Europe. As lawyer, he was instrumental in drawing up the four-party (France, UK, US, and USSR) agreement for the Allied occupation of Austria and was awarded the Bronze Star and Legion of Merit. He was discharged with the rank of Colonel.

== Later life ==
Howard retired from government service in 1958. For a time he resided in Brussels, where his wife was a U.S. representative to Expo 58. On August 2, 1958, Howard was a passenger on a Sabena flight from Athens to Brussels that was forced by fighter jets to land in Czechoslovakia. All aboard the plane were unharmed and the flight was allowed to resume after a four-hour detention. Howard died on July 2, 1966, at his summer home in Marblehead, Massachusetts.

Howard is memorialized by a large granite bench on Commonwealth Ave, near the corner of Arlington Street, which recognizes his leadership in the state and in the formation of the Back Bay Architectural District was formally passed by the Massachusetts Legislature in 1966 "to safeguard the heritage of the city of Boston by preventing the despoliation" of the neighborhood.
