= SS Maasdam (1920) =

Dutch steamship completed in 1921 and sunk by a U-boat in 1941

History

Netherlands
- Name: Maasdam
- Namesake: Maasdam
- Owner: Holland America Line
- Port of registry: Rotterdam
- Route: 1925–26: Rotterdam – Tampico
- Builder: Fijenoord, Rotterdam
- Yard number: 289
- Launched: 21 October 1920
- Completed: 6 August 1921
- Refit: 1935
- Identification: code letters PJSN (until 1933); call sign PFQS (by 1934)
- Fate: Sunk, 27 June 1941

General characteristics
- Type: 1921: ocean liner; 1935: cargo liner
- Tonnage: 8,812 GRT, 5,418 NRT, 11,400 DWT
- Length: 465.8 ft (142.0 m) overall, 450.0 ft (137.2 m) registered
- Beam: 58.2 ft (17.7 m)
- Draught: 30 ft 2 in (9.19 m)
- Depth: 37.2 ft (11.3 m)
- Decks: 2 + shelter deck
- Installed power: 880 NHP, 4,200 shp
- Propulsion: 3 × turbines, double reduction gearing, 1 × screw
- Speed: 13 knots (24 km/h)
- Capacity: cargo: 592,118 cu ft (16,766.9 m^{3}) grain; 540,238 cu ft (15,297.8 m^{3}) bale; passengers: 1921: 14 × 1st class, 174 × 2nd class, 802 × steerage; 1928: 14 × 1st class, 950 × 3rd class; 1935: 30 × 1st class, 60 × 2nd class
- Crew: 1921: 89; 1935: 48
- Sensors & processing systems: by 1923: submarine signalling; by 1934: wireless direction finding
- Armament: in Second World War: DEMS
- Notes: sister ships: Edam, Leerdam, Spaarndam

SS Maasdam was a Dutch turbine steamship that was launched in 1920 and sunk in 1941. She was the third Holland America Line (Nederlandsch-Amerikaansche Stoomvaart Maatschappij, or NASM) ship to be named after the village of Maasdam in South Holland.

She was built as an ocean liner with berths for 990 passengers. In 1935 her passenger accommodation was reduced, and she continued her career as a cargo liner. In June 1941 a U-boat sank her in the Battle of the Atlantic, killing two of her passengers.

== Building ==
Maatschappij voor Scheeps- en Werktuigbouw Fijenoord built Maasdam as yard number 289, launching her on 21 October 1920 and completing her on 6 August 1921. Her lengths were 465.8 ft (142.0 m) overall and 450.0 ft (137.2 m) registered. Her beam was 58.2 ft (17.7 m) and her depth was 37.2 ft (11.3 m). Her tonnages were 8,812 GRT, 5,418 NRT and 11,400 DWT. Her holds had capacity for 592,118 cu ft (16,766.9 m^{3}) of grain, or 540,238 cu ft (15,297.8 m^{3}) of baled cargo. As built, she had berths for 990 passengers: 14 in first class, 174 in second class, and 802 in steerage.

Until 1920, all NASM ships had reciprocating steam engines, in most cases triple-expansion. Maasdam was part of a new generation of NASM ships, nearly all of which had steam turbines, which were reduction-geared for economy. Maasdam had a three Brown-Curtis turbines, made by John Brown & Company in Clydebank, Scotland. They drove a single screw via double reduction gearing. Their combined power was rated at 880 NHP or 4,200 shp, and gave her a speed of 13 knots (24 km/h). As built, Maasdam had two funnels, but the second one was a dummy.

Maasdam was followed by three sister ships. Koninklijke Maatschappij 'De Schelde' Scheepswerf en Machinefabriek in Vlissingen launched Edam in January 1921. Scheepsbouw-Maatschappij 'Nieuwe Waterweg' in Schiedam launched Leerdam in December 1920, and Spaardnam in January 1922.

== Peacetime career ==
NASM registered Maasdam in Rotterdam. Her code letters were PJSN. By 1923 her navigation equipment included submarine signalling.

NASM ran various routes between Rotterdam and the Caribbean. In the 1925–26 season, Maasdam and her three sisters were working a route between Rotterdam and Tampico in Mexico. Outward voyages called at Antwerp, Boulogne, Bilbao, Santander, Gijón, A Coruña, Vigo, Havana and Vera Cruz. Return voyages called at Vera Cruz, New Orleans, Havana, A Coruña and Santander.

On 30 November 1926 Maasdam was about 400 nautical miles (740 km) off the coast of Spain, en route from Vera Cruz to Rotterdam, when she signalled that she was on fire. The fire started in her number 3 hold. The US cargo steamship West Ivis changed course to assist, and Maasdam declined an offer of assistance from the British cargo steamship Dalegarth. Maasdam reached Vigo on 2 December.

In 1928 NASM revised Maasdam's passenger accommodation. Second class and steerage were merged into third class, with berths for 950 passengers. First class continued to have 14 berths.

By 1934 her navigation equipment included wireless direction finding, and the call sign PFQS had replaced her code letters. At the beginning of 1935 Maasdam was refitted. Her dummy second funnel was removed, and her passenger capacity was reduced to 90 berths. First class was increased to 30, and third class was reduced to 60. The size of her crew was reduced from 89 to 48.

== Second World War ==
On the evening 17 February 1940, U-48 sank the Finnish cargo ship Wilja in the Western Approaches at position 49°24′N 07°11′W. Maasdam rescued all 27 crew two hours later. She continued her transatlantic voyage to Havana, where she landed Wilja's survivors.

On 9 May 1940 Maasdam was in Liverpool. The next day Germany invaded the Netherlands. By 26 May Maasdam was off Southend-on-Sea, joining a convoy that took her as far as the Firth of Forth off Methil. On 25 June she left the anchorage off Southend again, this time with Convoy OA 174, which dispersed at sea. Her destination was New York. She returned carrying general cargo via Halifax, Nova Scotia, where she joined eastbound Convoy HX 60. The convoy was bound for Liverpool, but Maasdam detached for Methil, where she joined Convoy FS 247 to Southend, arriving on 11 August.

The record of Maasdam's next westbound transatlantic crossing is missing. She returned with Convoy HX 81, which left Halifax on 16 October 1940 and reached Liverpool on 2 November 1940.

On 28 November 1940 Maasdam left Liverpool with Convoy OB 251, which dispersed at sea. On 12 December she collided with the British steamship Anthea off the coast of Canada, sinking her at position 44°48′N 46°37′W. Maasdam returned carrying grain and general cargo. She joined Convoy HX 105, which left Halifax on 25 January 1941 and reached Liverpool on 9 February.

On 8 March 1941 Maasdam left Liverpool with Convoy OB 295, which dispersed at sea. On 2 April 1941 she left Hoboken, New Jersey carrying grain and general cargo. On her return voyage she joined Convoy HX 119B, which left Halifax on 6 April and reached Liverpool on 22 April.

Maasdam was in Liverpool in the May Blitz, which began on 1 May 1941 and continued for seven nights. Luftwaffe bombers dropped 500-kilogram (1,100 lb) incendiary bombs, many of which fell around Maasdam. Her crew used shovels to push thermite incendiaries overboard, which melted the shovels. When a shovel was not to hand, one crewman used his overcoat to pick up a thermite bomb, which burned his arms and temporarily damaged his eyes.

On 12 May 1941 Maasdam left Liverpool with Convoy OB 322, which dispersed at sea. At the end of May she reached New York, where she loaded wheat and war materiél, including aircraft engines, and two twin-engined bomber aircraft, with their wings detached and loaded separately.

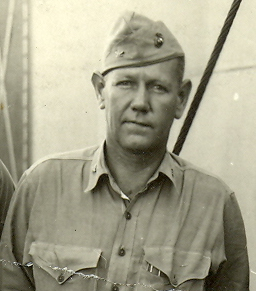
Walter Jordan, commander of the US Marines aboard Maasdam

She also embarked 32 passengers, including 11 US Marines on their way to serve at the Embassy of the United States, London, 17 American Red Cross nurses on their way to work at the ARC-Harvard Hospital at Salisbury in Wiltshire. The marines were commanded by Major Walter I Jordan. The nurses included Ruth Breckinridge, mother-in-law of attorney John Stephens Graham and former wife of politician Henry Breckinridge, who was to be house-mother to all 60 nurses at the ARC-Harvard Hospital. President Franklin D. Roosevelt had authorised an exemption from the Neutrality Act of 1939 to allow the nurses and marines to travel on the ship of a belligerent nation.

== Loss ==
On 11 June 1941 Maasdam left New York. She steamed to Halifax, where she joined Convoy HX 133, which comprised 64 merchant ships. HX 133 left on 16 June in dense fog, which lasted for the next four days, and contributed to several collisions. On 21 June, Convoy BHX 133 from Bermuda joined HX 133 at sea, increasing its size to 58 merchant ships.

On 23 June, U-203 of the 1st U-boat Flotilla found HX 133, 400 nautical miles (740 km) south of Greenland. Other members of the flotilla converged on the convoy. On the morning of 24 June different U-boats sank two Norwegian motor ships: Soløy just after 0330 hrs and the straggler Vigrid just after 1130 hrs. Shortly after 2100 hrs that evening, a third U-boat sank the British steamship Brockley Hill.

There were no attacks on 25 or 26 June. But in the early hours of 27 June, U-564 attacked the convoy about 300 nautical miles (560 km) southwest of Iceland, at position 59°56′N 30°35′W. Maasdam was the leading ship in the eighth column of the convoy. The second ship in the column was a Norwegian oil tanker, Kongsgaard. The leading ship in the ninth column, to port of Maasdam, was the British motor ship Malaya II. At 0155 hrs U-564 fired three torpedoes, the first of which hit Maasdam in her number 2 hold. The second hit Malaya II, whose cargo included 413 tons of TNT. She immediately exploded, killing 43 of her 49 crew, and showering Maasdam with débris, injuring a number of people, including the Master, Captain Boshoff, and his Third Officer. Maasdam's wheelhouse and chart room were destroyed, and her bow soon sank to sea level. Boshoff gave the order to abandon ship. The third torpedo from U-564 hit Kongsgaard, which caught fire but stayed afloat.

Maasdam had six lifeboats: numbers 1, 3 and 5 carried on her port side, and 2, 4 and 6 on her starboard side. The attack had blown away her number 1 boat, and left number 3 boat damaged and hanging from its davit. The crew had to cut it away in order to launch number 5 boat. Captain Boshoff ensured that Maasdam's wireless telegraphy codebooks had been thrown overboard in their weighted bag. He was unable to do the same for her confidential papers, as they had been in the chart room, which had been destroyed. After touring the ship to ensure that all passengers and crew had taken to the boats, Boshoff was the last to leave his ship, boarding number 6 boat, whose occupants also included the Chief Officer.

== Rescue ==
Survivors at first tried to keep together their four boats, numbers 2, 4, 5 and 6. Boats 2 and 4 reached HX 133's designated rescue ship, the Canadian cargo ship Randa. Boat 5 reached the Norwegian tanker Havprins, which was the third ship in the eighth column, behind Maasdam and Kongsgaard. Boat 6 was damaged, leaking, and eventually swamped. Its buoyancy tanks kept it afloat, but it was impossible to row. Waves washed several occupants away from the swamped boat. Those who could swim, started swimming toward Havprins, which was about 200 yards (180 m) away. Some of Havprins' Norwegian crew set out in the now-empty boat 5, and rescued from the water four people who had been washed overboard from boat 6.

Ruth Breckinridge swam to the side of Havprins. She was weak from either exhaustion or hypothermia. Several people tried to pull her from the water. One was Maasdam's Third Engineer, Eugene Plouvier, on a rope ladder. He got hold of her, but was unable to keep hold. At that moment Havprins suddenly changed course to avoid Maasdam, which at that time was still afloat. Breckinridge was sucked underwater and not seen again.

Havprins' crew had thrown a lifeline into the water, with an empty drum secured to the end for flotation. Several people in the water reached either the drum or the rope attached to it. They included Maasdam's Chief Engineer, Pieter Schutter, who found one of the nurses, Maxine Loomis, clinging to the drum "in utter terror", apparently in shock. Havprins' crew hauled the line and drum toward the ship, and each survivor let go and was rescued, but Loomis continued to cling to the drum. Two lines and a lifebuoy were thrown to her, but she did not respond. Eventually she lost her grip on the drum, and disappeared underwater near Havprins' propeller.

Randa detached from HX 133 and landed its share of Maasdam's survivors in Reykjavík, where another NASM ship, the liner Volendam, later picked them up. Havprins, which was carrying vital aviation fuel, stayed with the convoy. HX 133 reached Liverpool on 3 July 1941, but Havprins detached to dock at Avonmouth.

== Bibliography ==
- Baatenburg, David (2007). "SS Maasdam: The Battle of the Atlantic and a Dutch Sailor's Diary" (PDF). Origins. XXV (2). Calvin University.
- Haws, Duncan (1995). Holland America Line. Merchant Fleets series. Vol. 28. Uckfield: Travel Creatours Ltd Publications. ISBN 0946378258.
- Lloyd's Register of Shipping. Vol. II.–Steamers and Motor Vessels. London: Lloyd's Register of Shipping. 1922 – via Internet Archive.
- Lloyd's Register of Shipping. Vol. II.–Steamers and Motor Vessels. London: Lloyd's Register of Shipping. 1923 – via Internet Archive.
- Lloyd's Register of Shipping (PDF). Vol. II.–Steamers and Motorships of 300 Tons and Over. London: Lloyd's Register of Shipping. 1934 – via Southampton City Council.

== See also ==
- MV Zaandam
