= Katherine G. Howard =

American diplomat (1898–1986)

Katherine Graham Howard
- Born: September 30, 1898; Guyton, Georgia, US
- Died: January 26, 1986 (aged 87); Marblehead, Massachusetts, US
- Education: Salem Academy
- Alma mater: Smith College
- Known for: Secretary of the Republican National Committee
- Spouse: Charles P. Howard (m. 1921; died 1966)
- Parent(s): Joseph L. Graham; Margaret Nowell Graham
- Relatives: John Stephens Graham (brother)

Katherine Graham Howard (September 30, 1898 – January 26, 1986) was a graduate of Smith College with a bachelor's degree in politics and government. During the Eisenhower administration she served in the Federal Civil Defense Administration, U.S. delegate to NATO committee on civil defense, and Deputy U.S. Commissioner General to the Brussels World Fair. She was the daughter of artist Margaret Nowell Graham and Joseph L. Graham, a director at R.J. Reynolds. Her brothers were John Stephens Graham and Gregory Graham.

== Early life ==
Katherine Graham was born in Guyton, Georgia, and grew up there and in North Carolina. She was the daughter of American artist Margaret Nowell Graham and Joseph L. Graham, who was chairman of the board of the R.J. Reynolds Tobacco Company in the early 1900s. Howard attended Salem Academy, majored in fine arts at Salem College in North Carolina, and obtained her bachelor's degree in politics and government at Smith College in Massachusetts. She was the elder sister of John Stephens Graham and a cousin of Gone with the Wind author Margaret Mitchell. Her older brother Gregory Nowell Graham committed suicide at age 36.

== Career ==
=== Politics ===
In 1938, Howard served as director of the Women's Republican Club of Massachusetts and then was made president until 1945. She was an Alternate Delegate-at-large to the Republican National Convention in 1944, and from 1945 to 1953 she was a Massachusetts Republican National Committeewoman. For the 1948 Republican National Convention, Howard was a Massachusetts Delegate-at-Large. From 1948 until 1953, she was Secretary of the Republican National Committee and in 1952 was the Secretary of the Republican National Convention. She participated in Dwight D. Eisenhower's 1952 election campaign as a member of his Campaign Policy and Strategy Committee. During this period of increasing political involvement, Howard developed lasting relationships with many leading Republicans, most notably Leverett Saltonstall and Sinclair Weeks from Massachusetts.

=== Eisenhower administration ===
In 1953, Howard, a dedicated Republican, began her public service career in the Eisenhower administration working in the Federal Civil Defense Administration until 1957. Howard explained that she resigned as Deputy Administrator of the Civil Defense Administration after a year and a half because it created a hardship for her family, but continued to serve as a government consultant.

Howard was one of two delegates and the sole woman serving on the NATO committee on civil defense from 1953 to 1956. In March 1953, she participated in and witnessed Operation Doorstep, an atomic bomb explosion at the Nevada Test Site. From 1957 to 1958, she was Deputy U.S. Commissioner General to the Brussels World Fair (1957–58).

Throughout the political campaigns and service in the Eisenhower Administration, she advocated a larger role for women in politics and government.

== Personal life ==
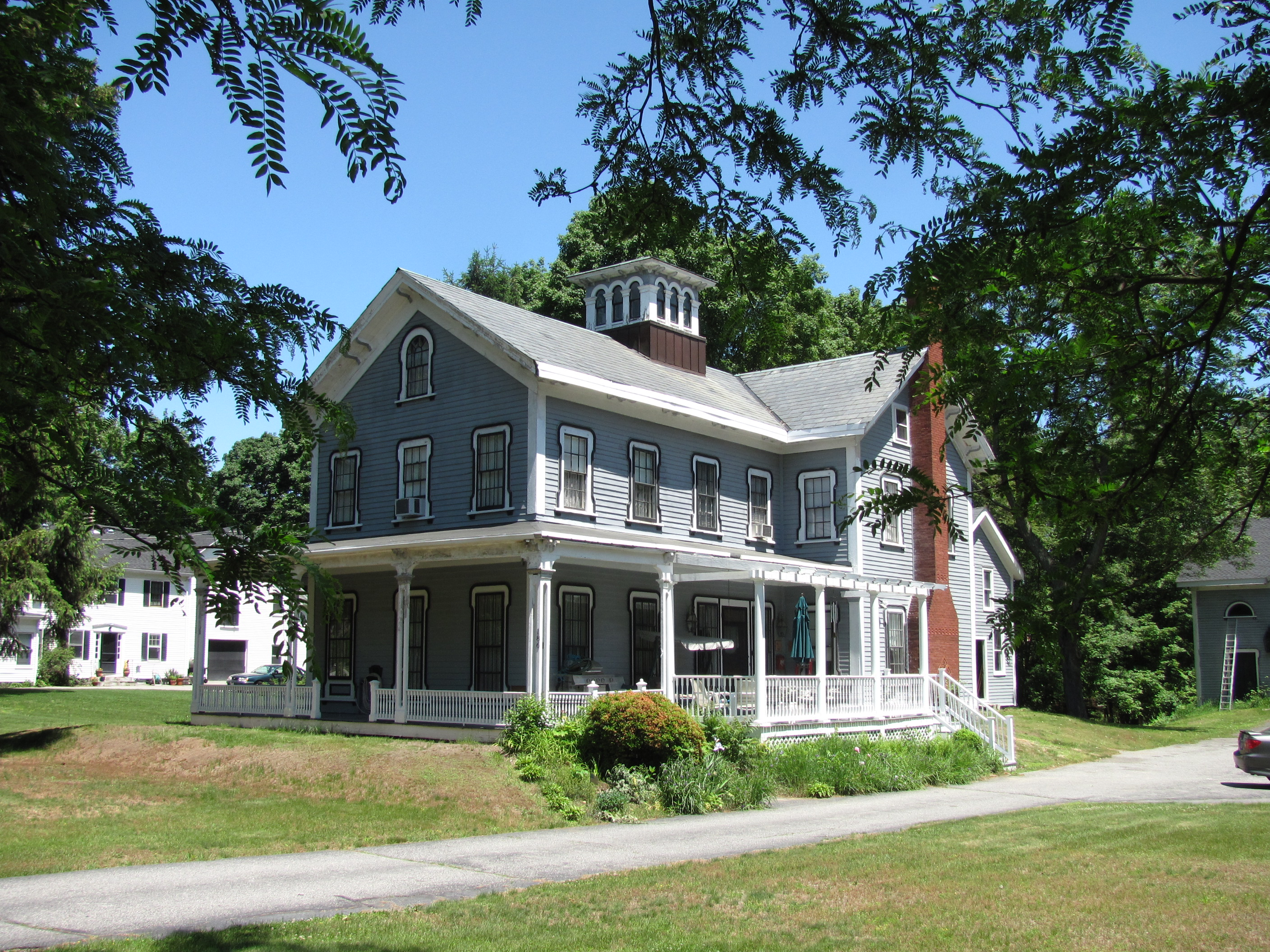
Kemp Place in Reading, MA

On September 15, 1921, in Forsyth County, North Carolina, she married Charles Paglesen Howard (1887-1966), a Harvard University lawyer, but without the approval of her father, who for a short period of time disinherited her. Howard, an attorney, maintained a Boston law practice and served in public service posts, including State Senator, Massachusetts State Commissioner of Administration and Finance (1928–1938), and Commissioner for Banks. In World War I and in World War II he served overseas in the Army. Howard's father was Dr. Herbert B. Howard, the former general director of the Massachusetts General Hospital and the founding general director of the Peter Bent Brigham Hospital, now the Brigham and Women's Hospital, in Boston.

Their home in Reading, MA, the former Kemp Place, is on the National Register of Historic Places. Together they had two children:

- Margaret Howard Haskell, who married Dayton Ball
- Herbert Graham Howard

Howard died on January 26, 1986, at the age of 87.
