= German submarine U-174 =

German World War II submarine

Coordinates: 43°35′N 56°18′W

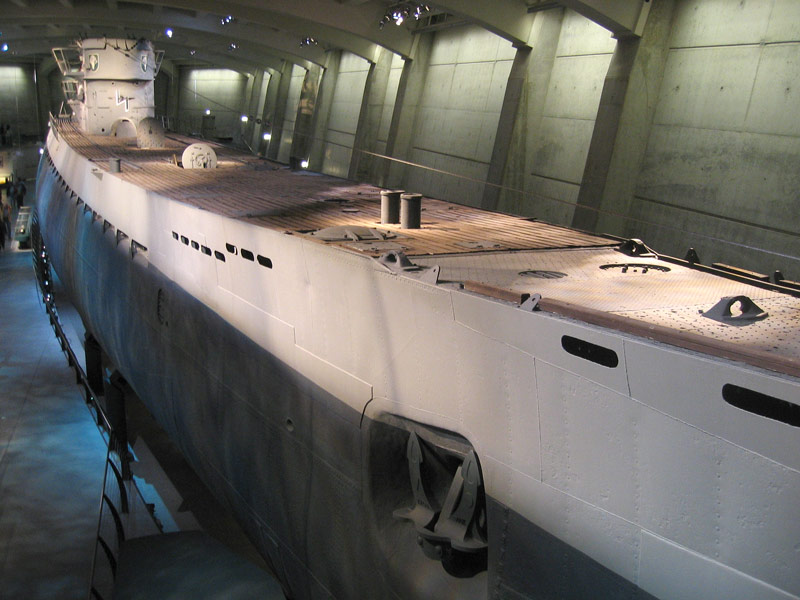
- U-505, a typical Type IXC boat

History

Nazi Germany
- Name: U-174
- Ordered: 23 December 1939
- Builder: DeSchiMAG AG Weser, Bremen
- Yard number: 1014
- Laid down: 2 January 1941
- Launched: 21 August 1941
- Commissioned: 26 November 1941
- Fate: Sunk, 27 April 1943

General characteristics
- Class & type: Type IXC submarine
- Displacement: 1,120 t (1,100 long tons) surfaced; 1,232 t (1,213 long tons) submerged
- Length: 76.76 m (251 ft 10 in) o/a; 58.75 m (192 ft 9 in) pressure hull
- Beam: 6.76 m (22 ft 2 in) o/a; 4.40 m (14 ft 5 in) pressure hull
- Height: 9.60 m (31 ft 6 in)
- Draught: 4.70 m (15 ft 5 in)
- Installed power: 4,400 PS (3,200 kW; 4,300 bhp) (diesels); 1,000 PS (740 kW; 990 shp) (electric)
- Propulsion: 2 shafts; 2 × diesel engines; 2 × electric motors
- Speed: 18.3 knots (33.9 km/h; 21.1 mph) surfaced; 7.3 knots (13.5 km/h; 8.4 mph) submerged
- Range: 13,450 nmi (24,910 km; 15,480 mi) at 10 knots (19 km/h; 12 mph) surfaced; 64 nmi (119 km; 74 mi) at 4 knots (7.4 km/h; 4.6 mph) submerged
- Test depth: 230 m (750 ft)
- Complement: 4 officers, 44 enlisted48 to 56
- Armament: 6 × torpedo tubes (4 bow, 2 stern); 22 × 53.3 cm (21 in) torpedoes; 1 × 10.5 cm (4.1 in) SK C/32 deck gun (180 rounds); 1 × 3.7 cm (1.5 in) SK C/30 AA gun; 1 × twin 2 cm FlaK 30 AA guns

Service record
- Part of: 4th U-boat Flotilla; 26 November 1941 – 31 July 1942; 10th U-boat Flotilla; 1 August – 27 April 1943
- Identification codes: M 41 607
- Commanders: F.Kapt. Ulrich Thilo; 26 November 1941 – 8 March 1943; Oblt.z.S. Wolfgang Grandefeld; 9 March – 27 April 1943
- Operations: 3 patrols: 1st patrol: 30 July – 6 September 1942; 2nd patrol: 7 October 1942 – 9 January 1943; 3rd patrol: 18 March – 27 April 1943
- Victories: 5 merchant ships sunk (30,813 GRT)

German submarine U-174 was a Type IXC U-boat of Nazi Germany's Kriegsmarine during World War II.

She was laid down at the DeSchiMAG AG Weser yard in Bremen as yard number 1014 on 2 January 1941, launched on 21 August and commissioned on 26 November with Fregattenkapitän Ulrich Thilo in command.

U-174 began her service career with training as part of the 4th U-boat Flotilla. She was reassigned to the 10th flotilla for operations on 1 August 1942.

She was sunk by an American Lockheed Ventura on 27 April 1943.

== Design ==
German Type IXC submarines were slightly larger than the original Type IXBs. U-174 had a displacement of 1,120 tonnes (1,100 long tons) when at the surface and 1,232 tonnes (1,213 long tons) while submerged. The U-boat had a total length of 76.76 m (251 ft 10 in), a pressure hull length of 58.75 m (192 ft 9 in), a beam of 6.76 m (22 ft 2 in), a height of 9.60 m (31 ft 6 in), and a draught of 4.70 m (15 ft 5 in). The submarine was powered by two MAN M 9 V 40/46 supercharged four-stroke, nine-cylinder diesel engines producing a total of 4,400 metric horsepower (3,240 kW; 4,340 shp) for use while surfaced, two Siemens-Schuckert 2 GU 345/34 double-acting electric motors producing a total of 1,000 metric horsepower (740 kW; 990 shp) for use while submerged. She had two shafts and two 1.92 m (6 ft) propellers. The boat was capable of operating at depths of up to 230 metres (750 ft).

The submarine had a maximum surface speed of 18.3 knots (33.9 km/h; 21.1 mph) and a maximum submerged speed of 7.3 knots (13.5 km/h; 8.4 mph). When submerged, the boat could operate for 63 nautical miles (117 km; 72 mi) at 4 knots (7.4 km/h; 4.6 mph); when surfaced, she could travel 13,450 nautical miles (24,910 km; 15,480 mi) at 10 knots (19 km/h; 12 mph). U-174 was fitted with six 53.3 cm (21 in) torpedo tubes (four fitted at the bow and two at the stern), 22 torpedoes, one 10.5 cm (4.13 in) SK C/32 naval gun, 180 rounds, and a 3.7 cm (1.5 in) SK C/30 as well as a 2 cm (0.79 in) C/30 anti-aircraft gun. The boat had a complement of forty-eight.

== Service history ==
=== First patrol ===
The boat departed Kiel on 30 July 1942, moved through the North Sea and negotiated the 'gap' between Iceland and the Faroe Islands. She encountered, in mid-Atlantic Ocean, the corvette HNoMS Potentilla. The Norwegian ship attacked; at one point, she was so close that a depth charge projected towards the U-boat, fell on the far side of the German vessel. The submarine escaped; nevertheless, the damage inflicted was sufficient to cause U-174 to leave a tell-tale trail of oil, thus obliging Thilo to abort the patrol. She entered Lorient, on the French Atlantic coast, on 6 September.

=== Second patrol ===
For her second sortie, she sailed to the waters off Brazil. There she sank four ships between 31 October and 2 November 1942. She sank a fifth vessel on 15 December but was twice unsuccessfully attacked by American Catalina aircraft on the same day. She returned to Lorient on 9 January 1943.

=== Third patrol and loss ===
U-174 had departed her French base on 18 March 1943, bound for the eastern seaboard of North America. On 27 April, she was attacked and sunk by an American Lockheed Ventura aircraft of VB-125 southwest of Newfoundland. Fifty-three men died; there were no survivors.

=== Wolfpacks ===
U-174 took part in one wolfpack, namely:

- Lohs (11 – 26 August 1942)

== Summary of raiding history ==
Date	Name	Nationality	Tonnage (GRT)	Fate
31 October 1942	Marlyn	United Kingdom	4,555	Sunk
1 November 1942	Elmdale	United Kingdom	4,872	Sunk
2 November 1942	Zaandam	Netherlands	10,909	Sunk
2 November 1942	Besholt	Norway	4,977	Sunk
15 December 1942	Alcoa Rambler	United States	5,500	Sunk

== In popular culture ==
The U-174 is said to have been the submarine on which Xavier March served during World War II in Robert Harris's 1992 alternative history novel Fatherland.

== See also ==
- Convoy ON 122

== Bibliography ==
- Busch, Rainer; Röll, Hans-Joachim (1999). German U-boat commanders of World War II: a biographical dictionary. Translated by Brooks, Geoffrey. London, Annapolis, Md: Greenhill Books, Naval Institute Press. ISBN 1-55750-186-6.
- Busch, Rainer; Röll, Hans-Joachim (1999). Deutsche U-Boot-Verluste von September 1939 bis Mai 1945 [German U-boat losses from September 1939 to May 1945]. Der U-Boot-Krieg (in German). Vol. IV. Hamburg, Berlin, Bonn: Mittler. ISBN 3-8132-0514-2.
- Gröner, Erich; Jung, Dieter; Maass, Martin (1991). U-boats and Mine Warfare Vessels. German Warships 1815–1945. Vol. 2. Translated by Thomas, Keith; Magowan, Rachel. London: Conway Maritime Press. ISBN 0-85177-593-4.
- Kemp, Paul (1999). U-Boats Destroyed – German Submarine Losses in the World Wars. London: Arms & Armour. ISBN 1-85409-515-3.
