= Kemp Place =

Historic house in Massachusetts, United States

- Kemp Place; Kemp Barn
- U.S. National Register of Historic Places
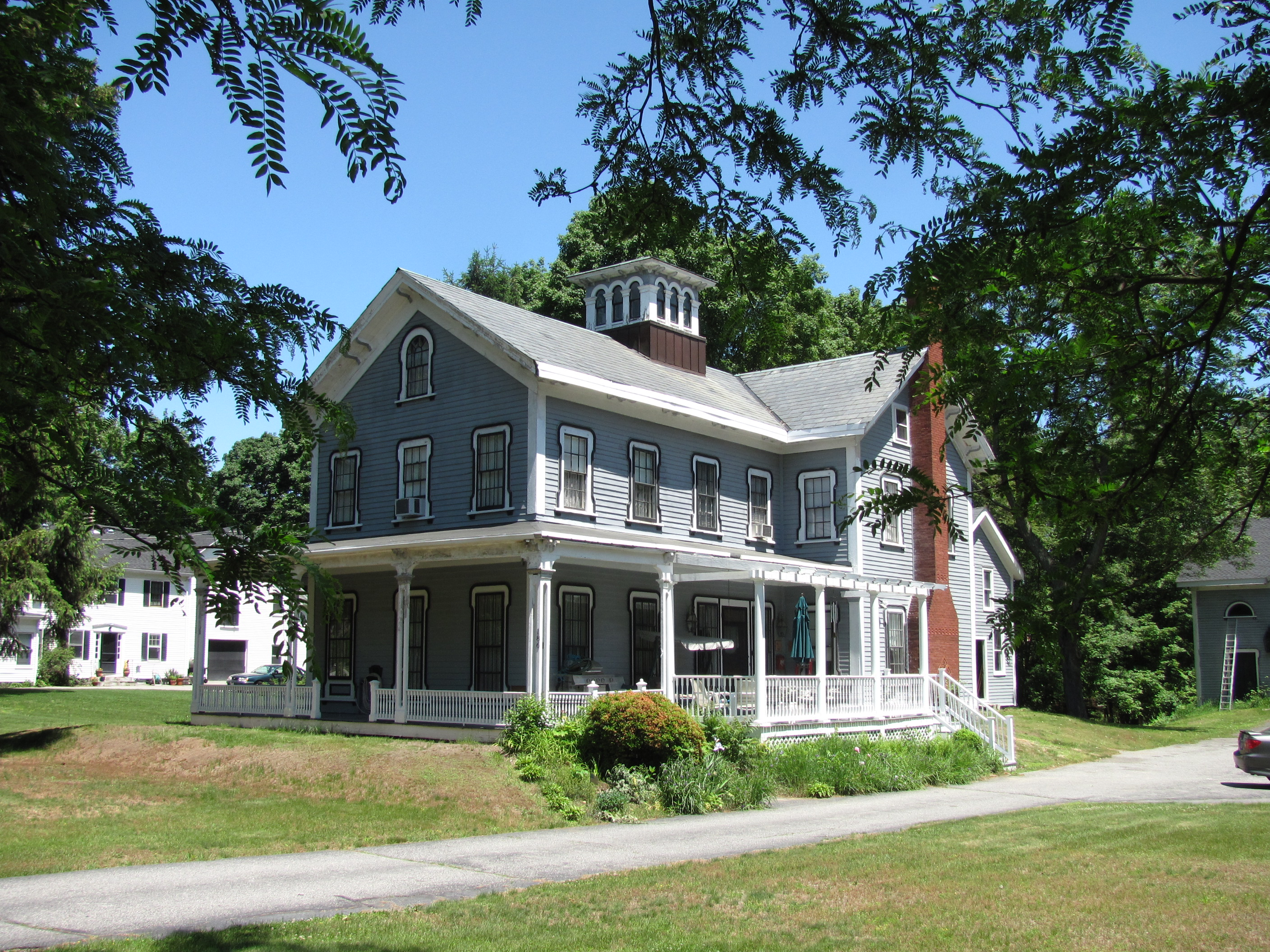
- Kemp Place, in 2011

- Location within Massachusetts Location within the United States
- Location: 186 Summer Avenue, Reading, Massachusetts
- Coordinates: 42°31′19″N 71°07′00″W
- Area: 1.57 acres (0.64 ha)
- Built: 1853
- Architectural style: Italianate
- MPS: Reading MRA
- NRHP reference No.: 84002723 (house), 84002721 (barn)
- Added to NRHP: July 19, 1984

The Kemp Place and Barn form a historic farmstead in Reading, Massachusetts. The main house is a 2 1/2-story Italianate wood-frame structure, with an L-shaped cross-gable footprint and clapboard siding. Its roofline is studded with paired brackets, its windows have "eared" or shouldered hoods, and there is a round-arch window in the front gable end. The porch wraps around the front to the side, supported by Gothic style pierced-panel posts. The square cupola has banks of three round-arch windows on each side. It is one of Reading's more elaborate Italianate houses, and is one of the few of the period whose cupola has survived.

The carriage barn, which stands at the rear of the 1.5-acre (0.61 ha) property, is a two-story rectangular wood-frame structure with a side-gable roof, and a smaller cross gable above the large center vehicle entrance bay. The building shares stylistic features with the house, including bracketed eaves and shouldered door hoods. The hayloft entrance, located above the main entrance, is surrounded by a scrolled carving.

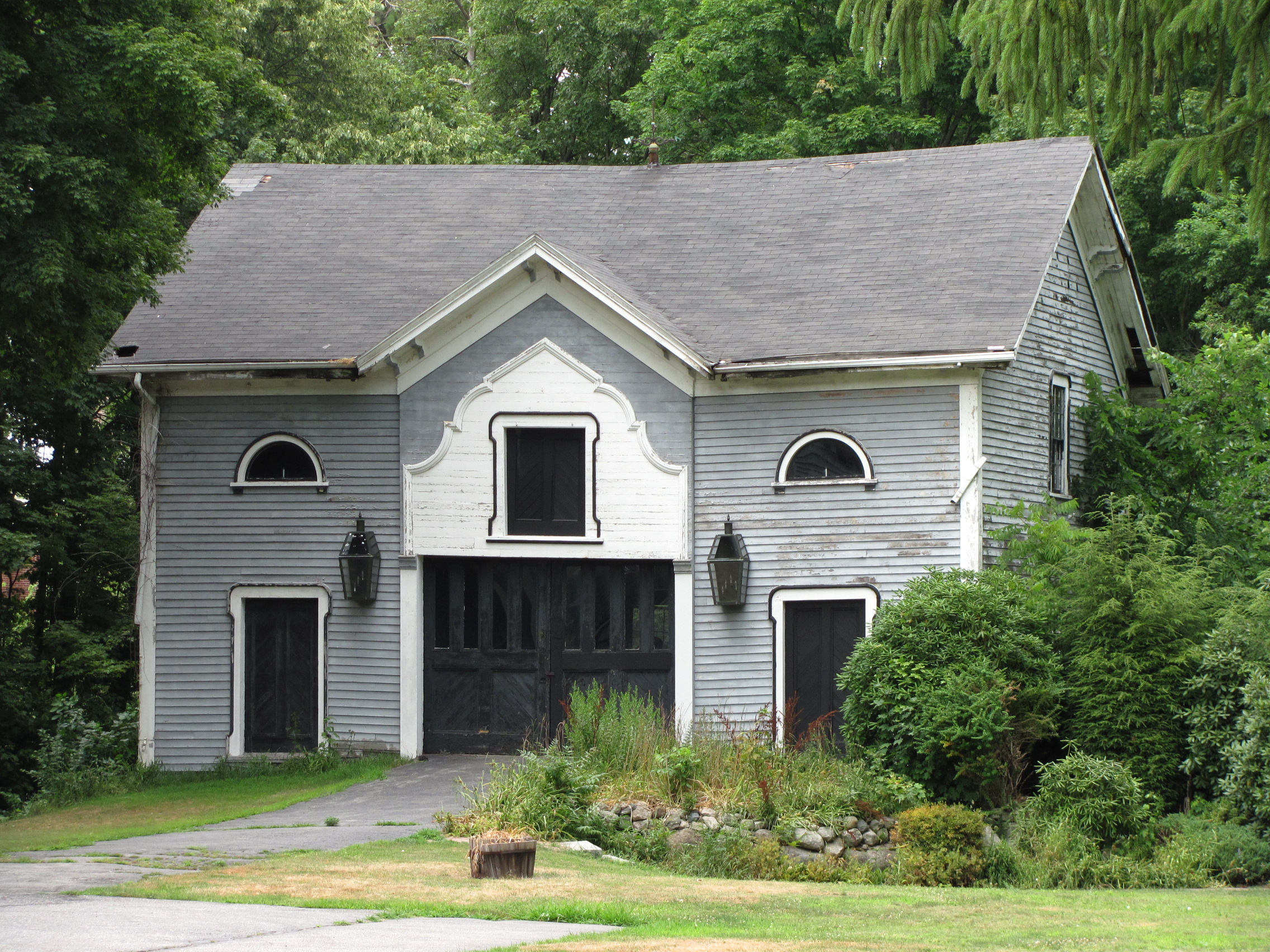
The carriage barn, in 2010

The farmhouse and barn were built in 1858 by Robert "Father" Kemp, founder of the Old Folks Concerts, a nostalgic singing group that toured the country. Kemp was politically active at the local level, serving on the school committee. A subsequent owner opened one of the nation's first dollar stores in Boston. In 1908, the house was inherited by Charles P. Howard, a prominent Harvard University lawyer, who was active in local and state politics. Howard's wife Katherine was active in Republican Party politics, serving as secretary of the Republican National Convention in 1952.

The farmhouse and carriage barn were each separately listed on the National Register of Historic Places in 1984. Demolition of both structures was proposed by its owner in 2014 due to the extensive presence of wood rot, but a six-month delay was imposed by the local historical commission in August 2014.

== See also ==
- National Register of Historic Places listings in Reading, Massachusetts
- National Register of Historic Places listings in Middlesex County, Massachusetts
