= Kemp & Hebert Building =

- U.S. National Register of Historic Places
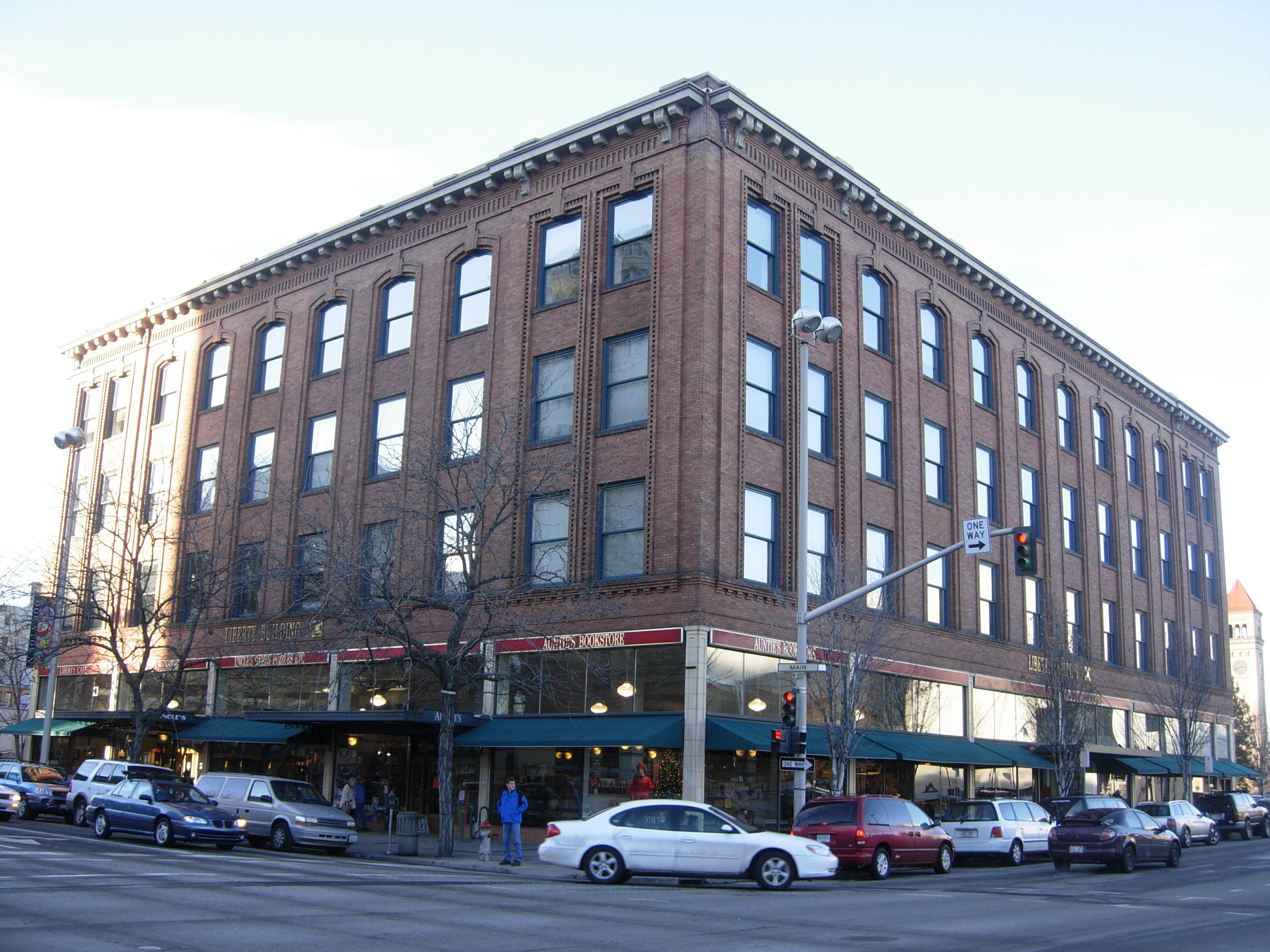
- The building in 2007

- Location within Spokane riverfront area
- Location: 404 West Main Avenue, Spokane, Washington
- Coordinates: 47°39′33″N 117°25′07″W
- Area: less than one acre
- Built: 1908
- Architect: Jones, Alfred
- Architectural style: Chicago, Classical Revival
- NRHP reference No.: 94000660
- Added to NRHP: July 1, 1994

The Kemp & Hebert Building, also known as the Liberty Furniture Store, is a historic four-story building in Spokane, Washington. It was designed by Alfred D. Jones in the Classical Revival style, and built in 1908 as a store for Kemp & Hebert, a dry goods company co-founded by Spokane businessmen Charles John Kemp (1857–1914) and Henry H. Hebert (1866–1941) in 1892.

The building was purchased by Shannon Ahern and Chris O'Harra in the fall of 1993 and was remodelled to be the home of Auntie's Bookstore and Uncle's Game Store. They had the building listed on the National Register of Historic Places since July 1, 1994. And changed the name of the building to the Liberty Building.

Today the building is home to over 30 local businesses.
