= Wascom House =

United States historic place

- U.S. National Register of Historic Places
- Location within Louisiana Location within the United States
- Location: 303 E. Michigan Ave., Hammond, Louisiana
- Coordinates: 30°30′41″N 90°27′35″W
- Area: less than one acre
- Built: c. 1897
- Built by: Clavert
- Architectural style: Stick/Eastlake, Italianate
- NRHP reference No.: 08000030
- Added to NRHP: February 19, 2008

The Wascom House, at 303 E. Michigan Ave. in Hammond, Louisiana, was built around 1897. It was listed on the National Register of Historic Places in 2008. It has also been known as Kemp House.

It was constructed by a builder named Clavert, in a vernacular version of Stick/eastlake architecture, with some Italianate influence.

The house was repaired after some damage in Hurricane Katrina.
