= John and Margarethe Kemp Cabin =

Historic house in Wisconsin, United States

- Kemp, John and Margarethe, Cabin
- U.S. National Register of Historic Places
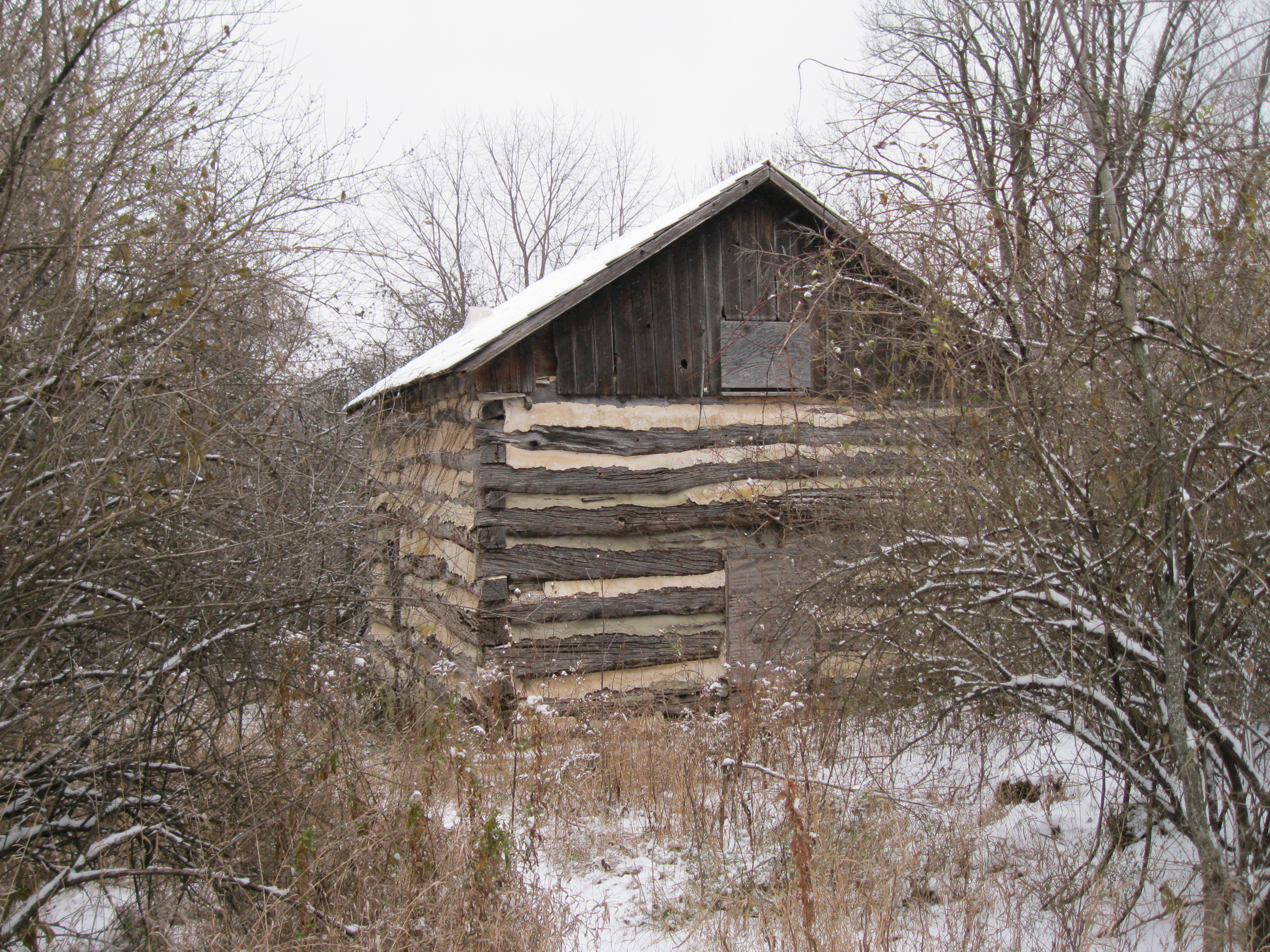

- Location within Wisconsin Location within the United States
- Location: 6950 WI Hwy. 78, Mazomanie, Wisconsin
- Coordinates: 43°13′51″N 89°43′35″W
- Area: less than one acre
- Built: 1863
- Built by: John Kemp
- Architectural style: single pen log house
- NRHP reference No.: 08001187
- Added to NRHP: December 10, 2008

The John and Margarethe Kemp Cabin is a log cabin built in 1863 by a German immigrant pioneer family in the Town of Mazomanie, Wisconsin, United States. It was added to the National Register of Historic Places in 2008.

== History ==
John and Margarethe Kemp married in Prussia, had two children there, then immigrated to America. In 1863 they bought the 80 acre parcel that contains the cabin. They were probably the first settlers on the land, and put up the cabin quickly, flattening only one side of the logs to make a smooth inner wall, and joining the corners with simple square notches and wooden pegs. The Kemps lived on the farm until around 1900, and despite its simple construction, the cabin served as a home into the 1920s.

After the Kemps, Andrew Williams owned the farm for about ten years, then the George Wachter family farmed it for fifty years. It was bought by Larrie and Diana Isenring in 1961, and they used the cabin as the office of their campground. The Isenrings would sell the site to the Wisconsin Department of Natural Resources in 1989, and it now lies within the Blackhawk Unit of the Lower Wisconsin Riverway recreational area.
