= MS Italia (1965) =

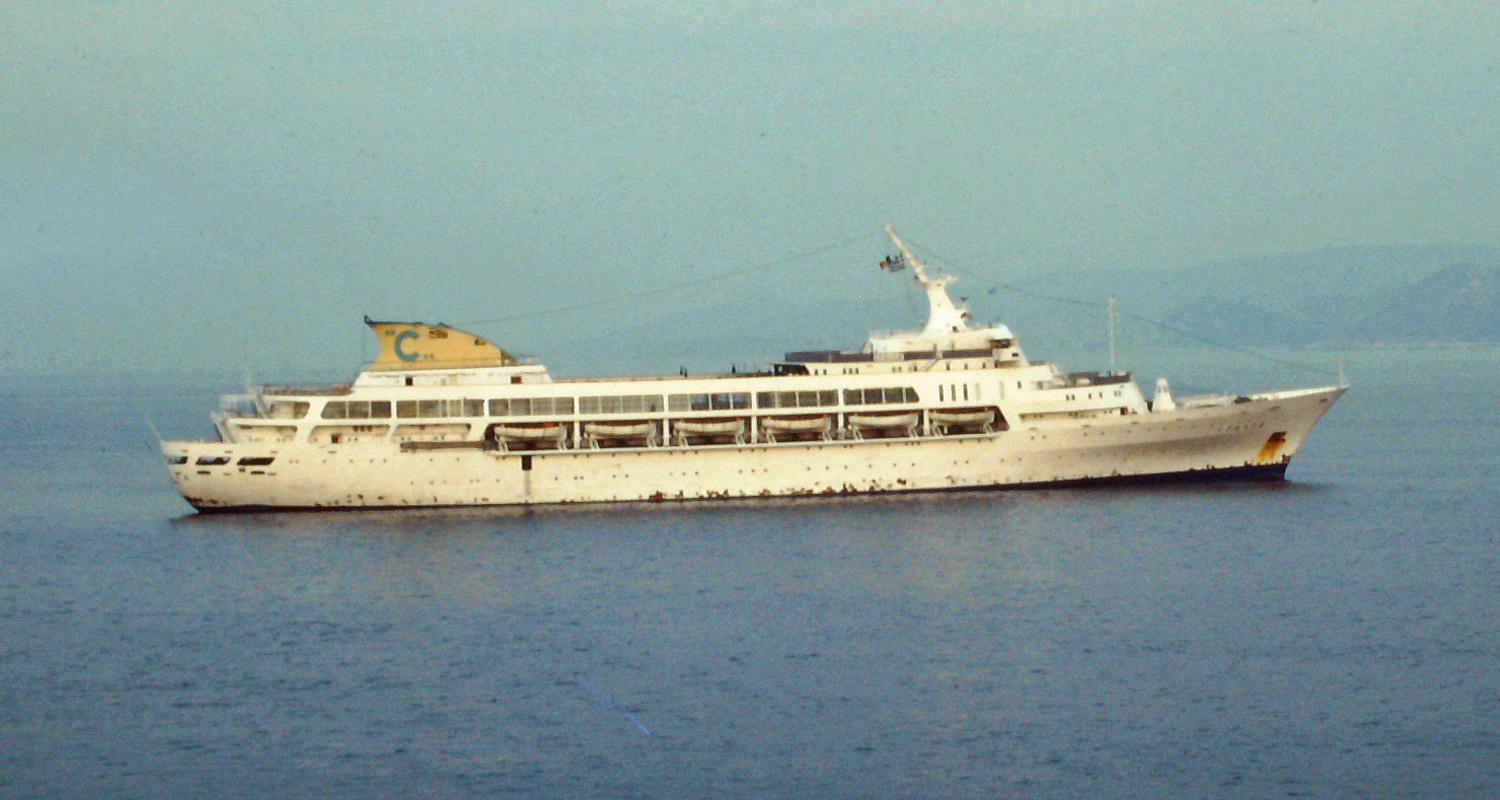
- Italia off the coast of Piraeus in 1980

History
- Name: Italia (1967); Princess Italia (1967–1973); Italia (1973–1983); Ocean Princess (1983–1993); Sea Prince (1993–1995); Princesa Oceanica (1995–1996); Sapphire (1996–2012); Aspire (2012)
- Owner: 1967–1977: Crociere d'Oltremare; 1977–1983: Costa Cruises; 1983–1993: Ocean Cruise Line; 1993–1995: Sunshine Cruise Line; 1996–2012: Louis Cruise Lines; 2012: Taymouth Ltd
- Operator: 1967: Fratelli Cosulich; 1967–1973: Princess Cruises; 1973–1983: Costa Cruises; 1983–1993: Ocean Cruise Line; 1993–1995: Sunshine Cruise Line; 1996–2002: Thomson Holidays; 2002–2010: Louis Cruise Lines
- Port of registry: 2004–2010: Majuro, Marshall Islands; 2010–2012: Valletta, Malta; 2012: Basseterre, Saint Kitts and Nevis
- Ordered: 1963
- Builder: Cantieri Navale Felszegi, Trieste
- Yard number: 76
- Laid down: 23 June 1963
- Launched: 29 April 1965
- Completed: 1967
- In service: 1967
- Out of service: 2010
- Identification: Call sign: V4LA2; IMO number: 6513994
- Fate: Scrapped in Alang, India, 2012

General characteristics
- Tonnage: 12,263 GRT
- Length: 149 m (489 ft)
- Beam: 21.50 m (71 ft)
- Draught: 6.80 m (22 ft)
- Propulsion: Sulzer CRDA diesel engines
- Speed: 17 knots (31 km/h; 20 mph)
- Capacity: 706 passengers
- Crew: 240

MS Italia was a cruise ship built in Italy in 1967. She sailed in the Mediterranean, Caribbean, and Pacific under various names and operators, and was scrapped in May 2012.

== Construction ==
The Italia was ordered as one of two sisters for the Italian company Sunsarda SpA in 1963, and was one of the first purpose-built cruise ships. Her interiors were designed by Gustavo Finali and Romano Boico, who designed the interiors for other famed Italian liners, such as the SS Raffaello and her sister SS Michelangelo. Her funnel and engines were placed towards her stern, a design similar to that of the SS Oceanic of 1965. Fitting out had to be halted as both her future owners and Felszegi, the builders, went bankrupt, and consequently her planned sister was never built. Eventually her incomplete hull was purchased by Crociere d'Oltremare. Her on board features as built included self operational air conditioning, closed circuit televisions, a radio, and telephone in most of her staterooms.

== Service history ==
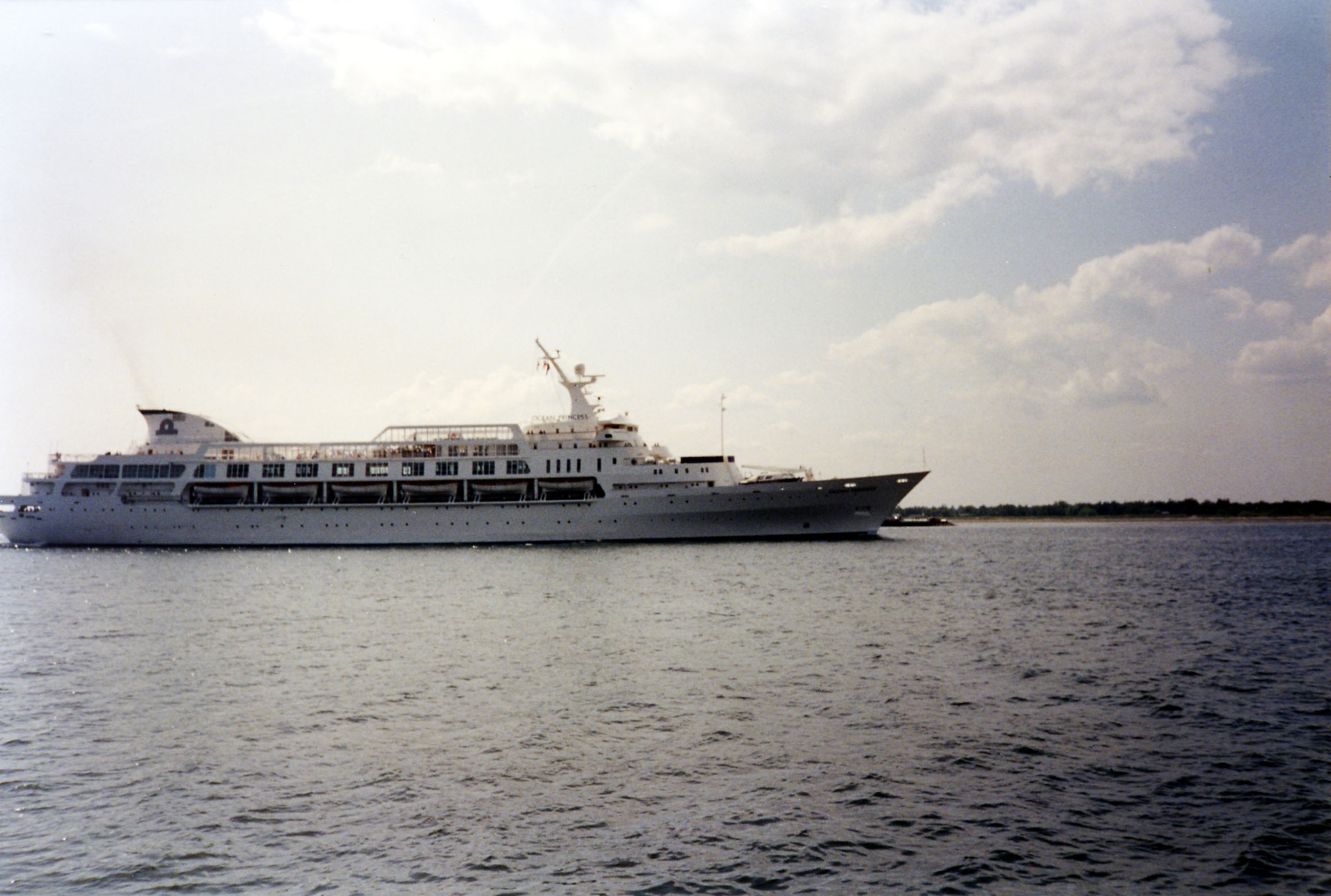
Italia as Ocean Princess

Italia was never operated for Crociere d'Oltremare, who chartered her to a Genoa-based company called Fratelli Cosulich for three cruise voyages in the Mediterranean, and in turn was chartered to Princess Cruises. During her delivery voyage to Princess from Trieste to California the "camp classic" film Valley of the Dolls premiered on board in the ship's movie theater. Princess renamed her Princess Italia and had the ship sail to Mexico out of Los Angeles. In 1968 the logo on the ship's funnel was changed from red and yellow triangles to Princess's now signature "sea witch" logo.

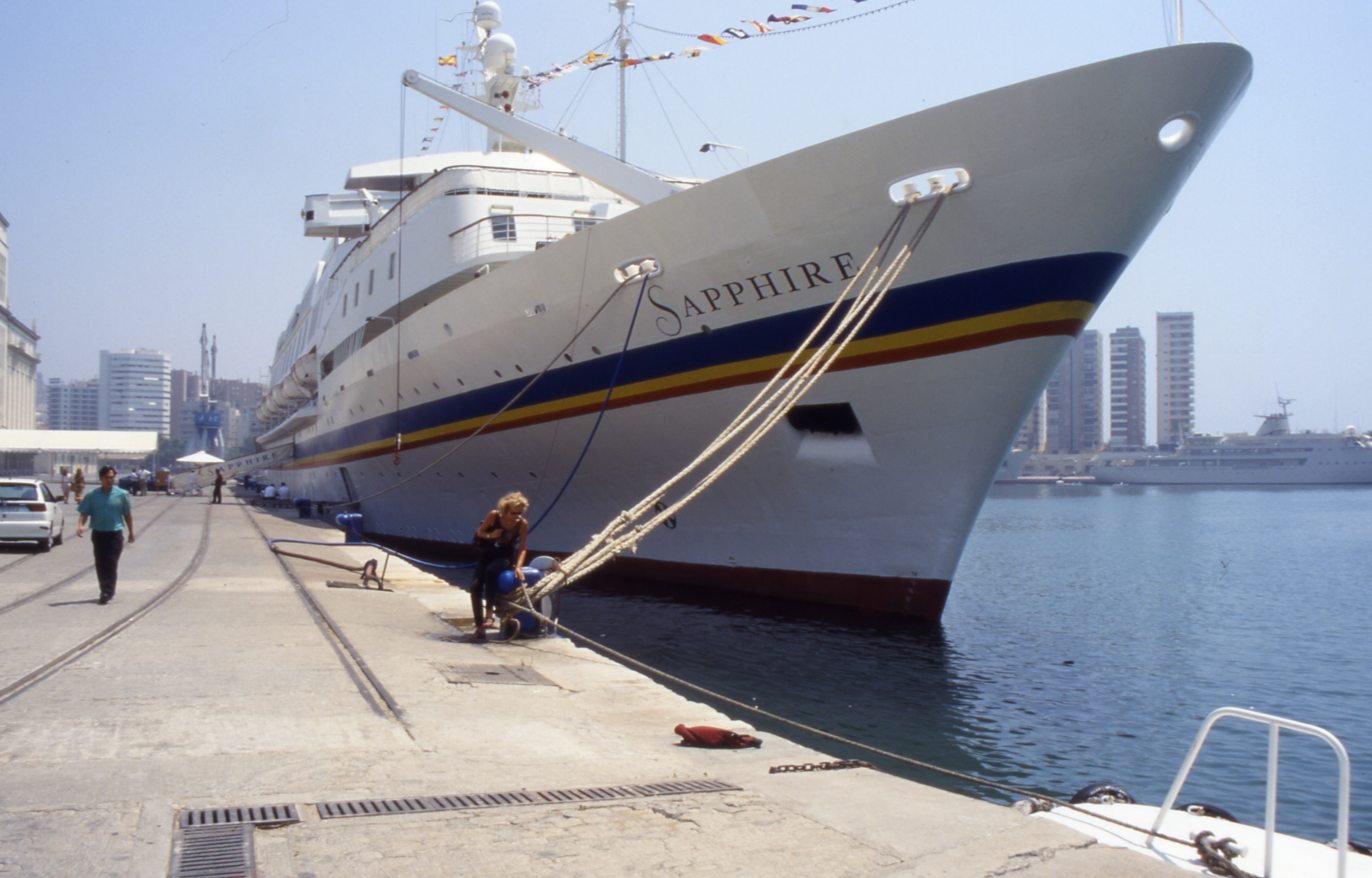
Italia as Sapphire in Málaga, Spain

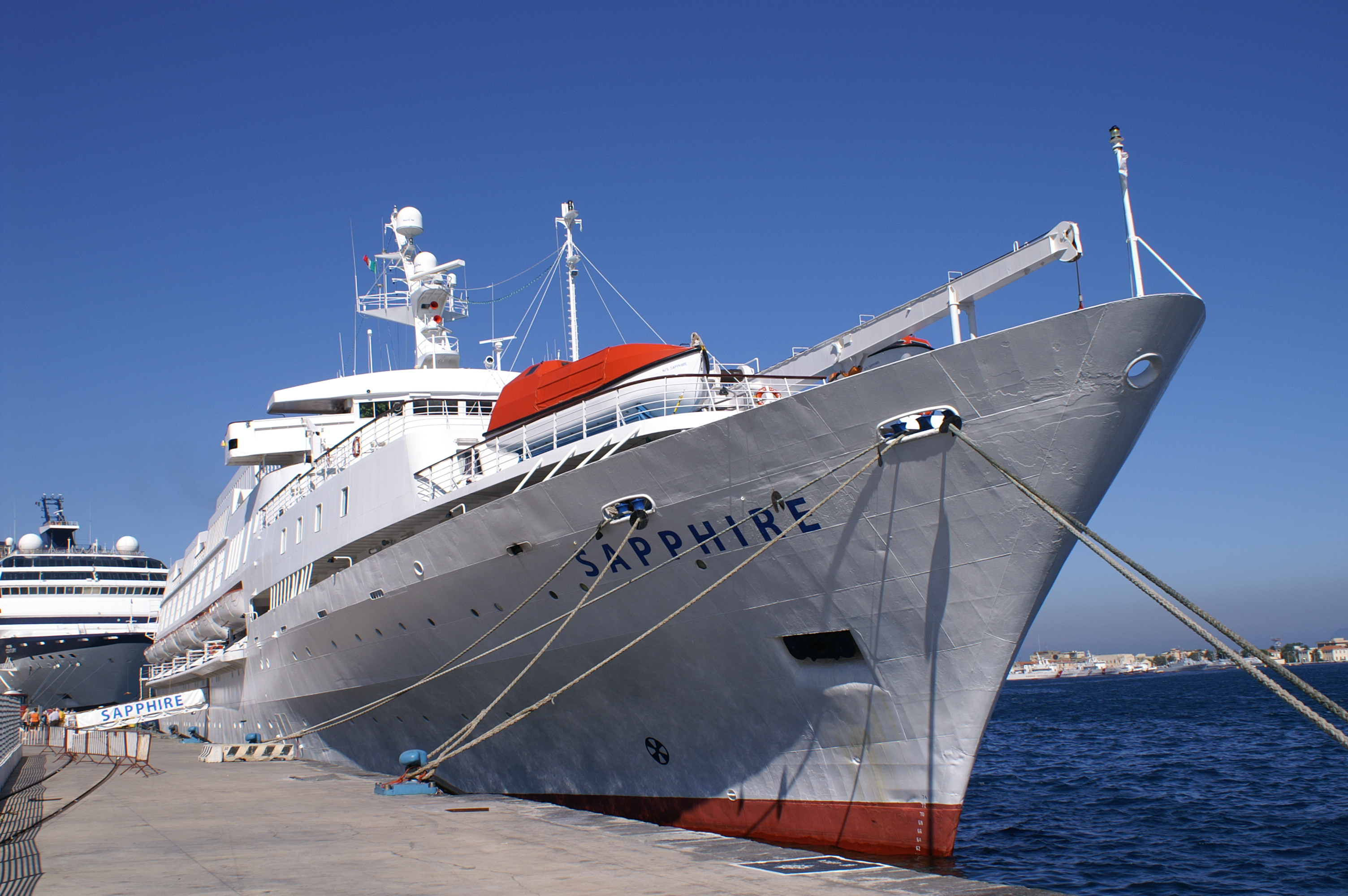
Italia as Sapphire in Messina, 2006

In 1969, Princess Italia began to operate cruises in Alaska, and continued both itineraries until 1973, when Crociere d'Oltremare canceled her charter to Princess. She was subsequently chartered to Costa Cruises, who changed her name back to Italia and operated her on cruises out of San Juan, Puerto Rico. In 1977 Costa purchased the ship and began chartering her to various companies. This ended in 1983 when Costa sold Italia to Ocean Cruise Line. Ocean Cruise Line renamed her Ocean Princess and had her do cruises in the Mediterranean during the summer, and in the Caribbean and Latin America during the winter. In March 1993, while cruising through the Amazon, the Ocean Princess struck a sunken wreck on the river bottom, causing her engine room and lower decks to flood. All passengers and crew were rescued unharmed, but the ship herself was declared a Total Constructive Loss.

Italia, in her livery as Sapphire for Louis Cruise Lines on June 2 2010.

After repairs, she was purchased by Sunshine Cruise Line and due to re-enter service as Sea Prince in 1995, but a fire broke out on board, and she was again offered for sale. She was in the end purchased by the Cyprus-based cruise line Louis Cruises, who had her named Princesa Oceanica after a major refit. But Princesa Oceania did not keep her new name for long, as she was chartered to the British cruise company Thomson Holidays, who would rename her Sapphire. Sapphire went on to cruise with Thomson until 2002, when she was returned to Louis. Under the ownership of Louis she retained the name Sapphire. The itinerary of Sapphire before she was retired included cruises around the Greek Islands, as well as cruises calling in Lebanon and Syria and various ports of Greece.

== Fate ==
Sapphire did not fulfill the new regulations of SOLAS 2010, a convention that has caused the scrapping of many vintage cruise ships owned by Louis Cruise Lines, including the Ivory and Serenade. Because she had not been upgraded to meet these new safety requirements, Sapphire was retired from service in autumn 2010.

In May 2012, the ship was beached for scrapping in Alang under the name of Aspire.
