= Ocean Countess =

Cruise ship built in 1976

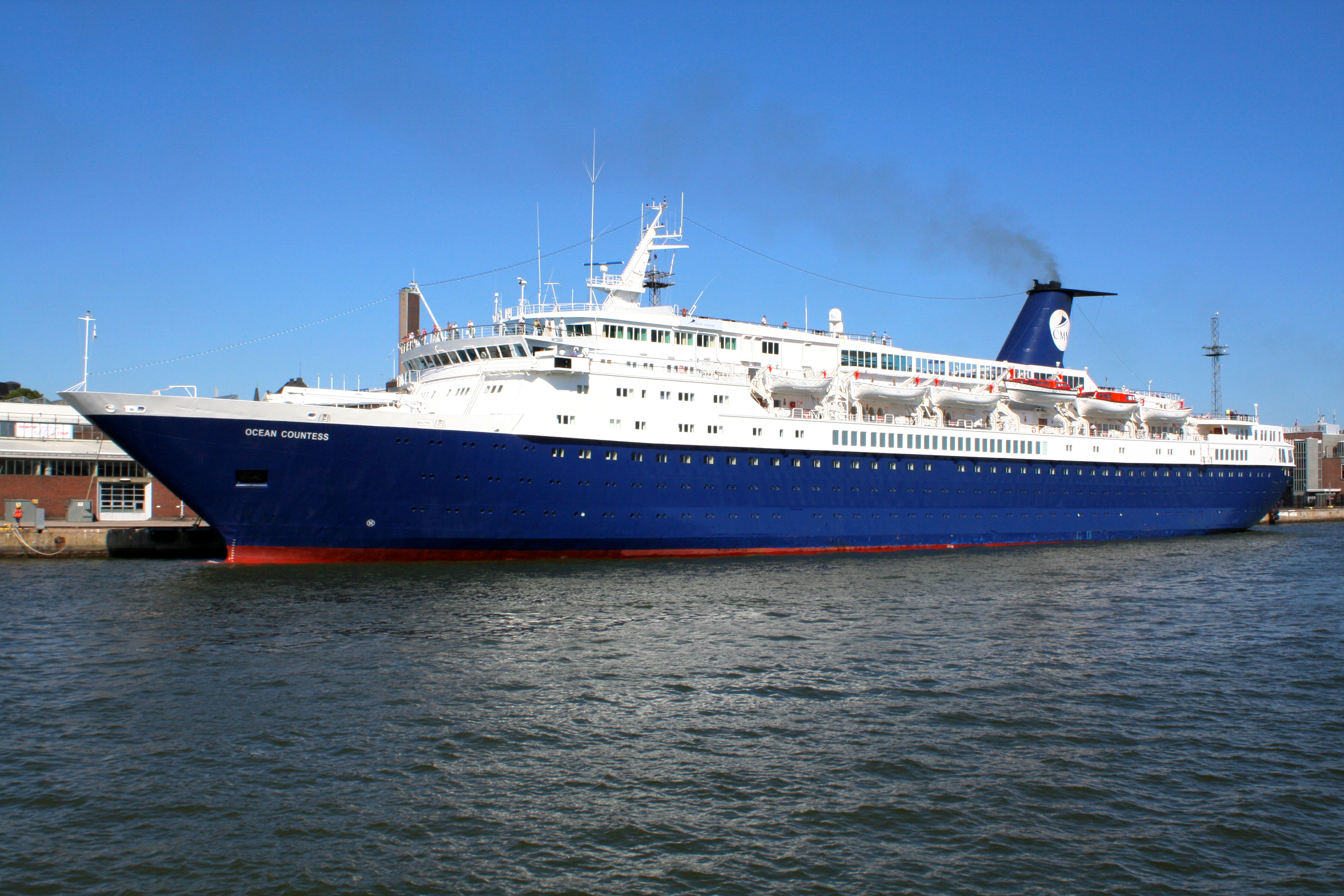
- Ocean Countess at Helsinki, 5 July 2010.

History
- Name: 1975–1996: Cunard Countess; 1996–1998: Awani Dream II; 1998–2002: Olympic Countess; 2002–2004: Olympia Countess; 2004–2005: Ocean Countess; 2005–2006: Lili Marleen; 2006–2007: Ocean Countess; 2007: Ruby; 2007-2014: Ocean Countess
- Owner: 1975–1996: Cunard; 1996–1998: Awani Cruises; 1998–2002: Royal Olympic Cruises; 2002–2004: Royal Olympia Cruises; 2004–2014: Maximus Navigation
- Operator: 1976–1996: Cunard; 1996–1998: Awani Cruises; 1998–2002: Royal Olympic Cruises; 2002–2004: Royal Olympia Cruises; 2004–2005: Majestic International Cruises; 2005: Elysia Cruises; 2005–2006: Holiday Kreuzfahrten; 2007: Louis Cruise Lines; 2007: Monarch Classic Cruises; 2009: Quail Cruises; 2010–2012: Cruise & Maritime Voyages
- Port of registry: 1976-1990: Southampton, United Kingdom; 1990-1996: Nassau, Bahamas; 1996-1998: Panama, Panama; 1998-2004: Piraeus, Greece; 2004-2014: Madeira, Portugal
- Builder: Burmeister & Wain, Copenhagen, Denmark (hull); Navali Mechaniche Affini (INMA), La Spezia, Italy (outfitting)
- Yard number: 858 (B&W)
- Launched: 20 September 1974
- Completed: June 1976
- In service: 14 August 1976
- Out of service: 22 October 2012 (retired)
- Identification: IMO number: 7358561
- Fate: Caught fire and scrapped at Alang, Turkey in 2014

General characteristics
- Type: Cruise ship
- Tonnage: 17,593 GRT
- Length: 537 ft (163.68 m)
- Beam: 75 ft (22.86 m)
- Propulsion: Diesel
- Speed: 17 knots
- Capacity: 800
- Crew: 350

Ocean Countess was a cruise ship owned by Majestic International Cruises of Greece. She was completed in 1976 as Cunard Countess for Cunard and was a popular ship in the Caribbean cruise market for 20 years. After leaving Cunard service in 1996, she had a number of owners before being purchased by Majestic in 2004. She was retired in 2012 and scrapped in 2014 after a fire destroyed the ship.

== History ==
Cunard Countess was built in Denmark in 1974-75 and initially registered in Southampton, England. The vessel was fitted-out at the INMA shipyard at La Spezia, Italy, from where trials were conducted and the vessel completed in July 1976. The ship proceeded to her Caribbean Sea base port of San Juan, Puerto Rico, via Barcelona, Spain and Antigua. A part-ship charter group of passengers was carried on this maiden voyage, between Barcelona and Antigua. On the eve of entering full commercial service in August 1976, Cunard Countess was christened at San Juan by Janet Armstrong, then wife of Neil Armstrong, the first man to walk on the moon.

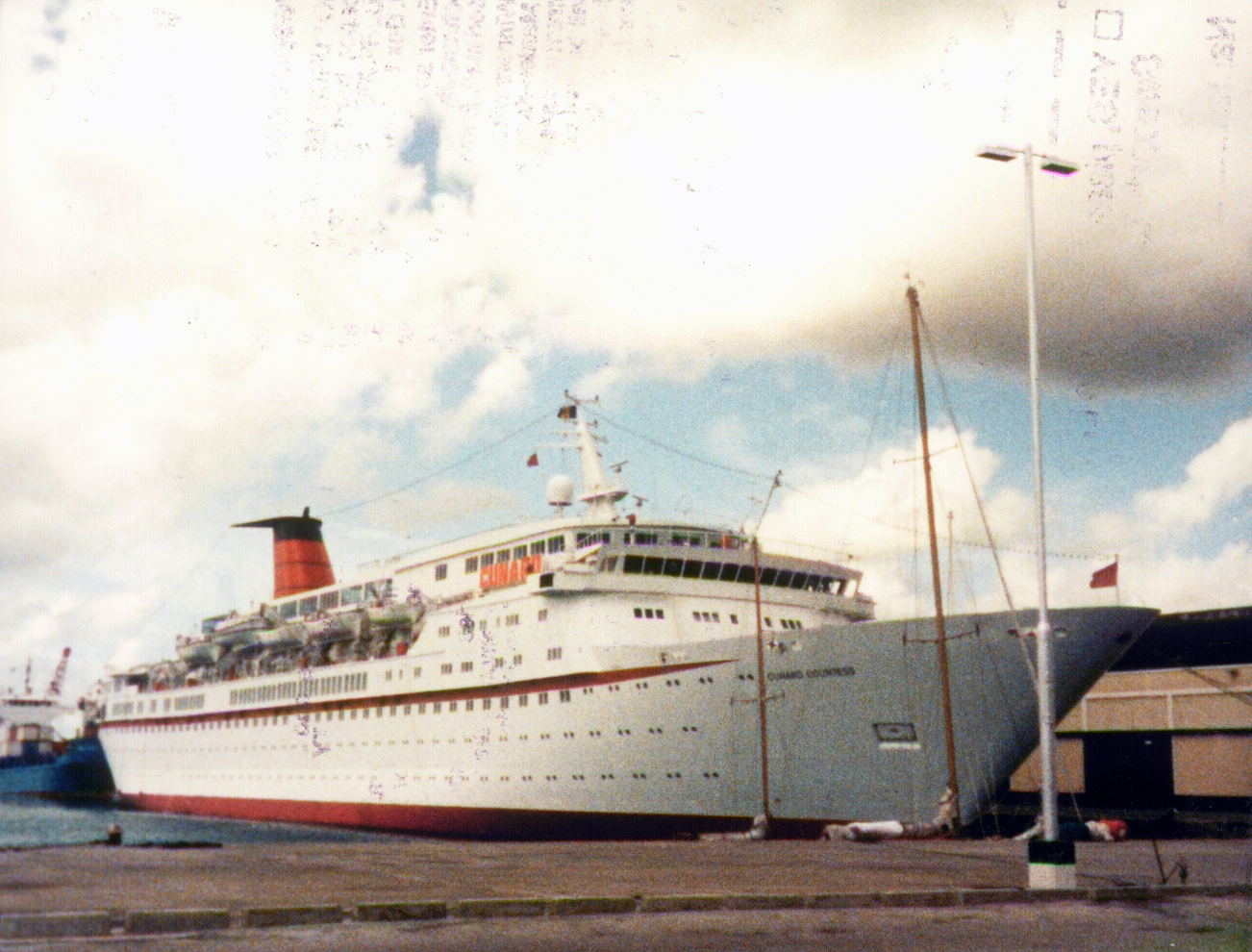
Cunard Countess docked in Martinique, 1982

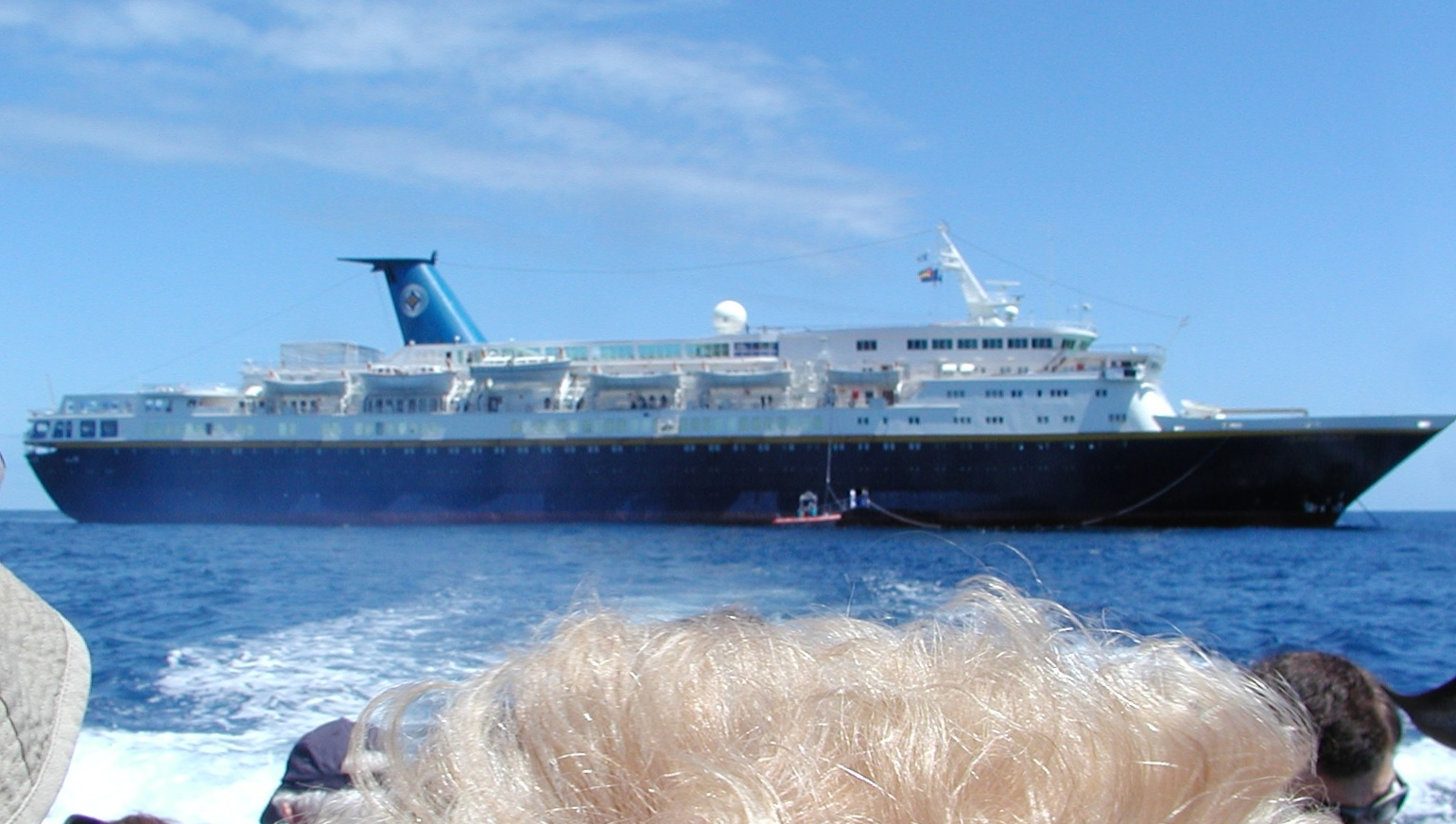
Olympic Countess off of Mozambique in December 2002

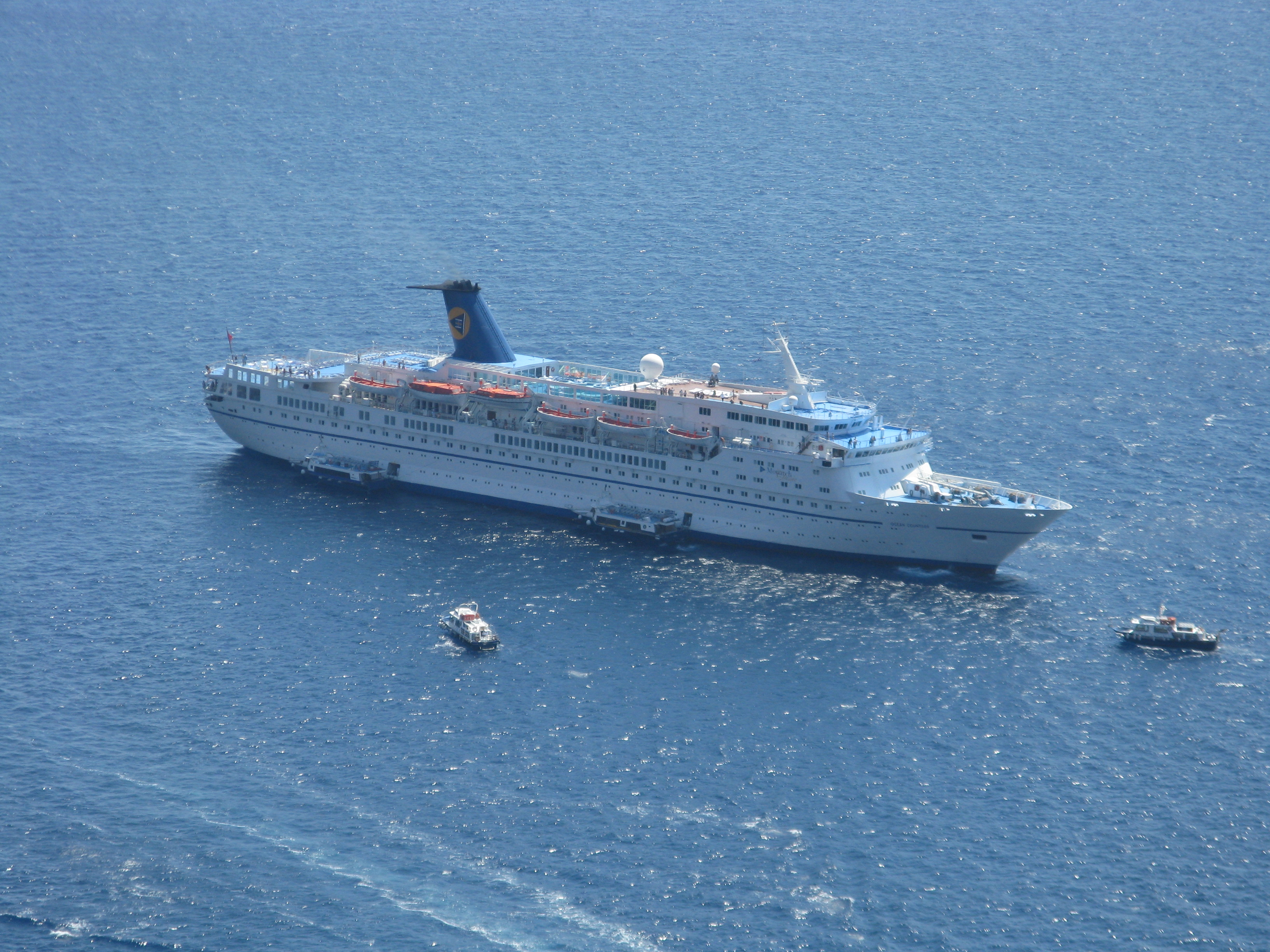
Ocean Countess anchored off Santorini, July 2008

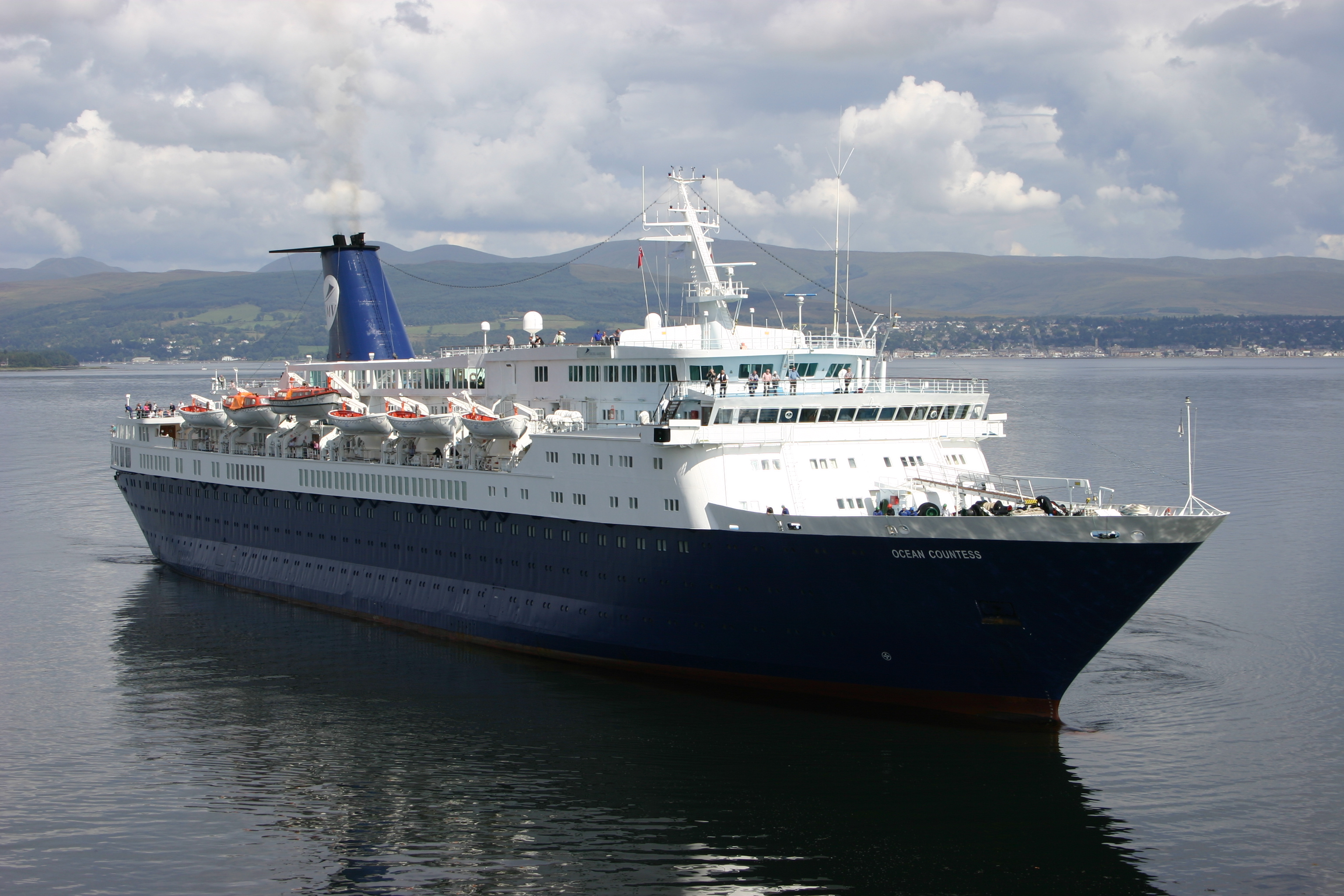
Ocean Countess arriving at Greenock, August 2012

The '4-star-Premium' style Cunard Countess, with her almost-identical sister ship Cunard Princess of 1977, became popular with the North American and British/European market, particularly for their contemporary facilities and variety entertainment. They were well known for their cruises in the Caribbean and middle Atlantic Ocean, becoming a staple at the San Juan ship dock and later at Miami, Santo Domingo and many other places around the area. Cunard Countess was notably one of the few ships to regularly visit the Caribbean island of Grenada during the revolutionary period of that island (1979–1983) and thus played a major role in supporting the local tourist industry during those years. Two of Cunard Countess's competitors in the Caribbean during the late 1970s-1980s were the much older but also very popular SS Amerikanis and Carla C, all three being of similar dimensions and capacity (recently built cruise ships are generally far larger). Other contemporary ships in this market were the P&O/Princess Cruises' Sun Princess and Island Princess, both also having similar dimensions and capacity to Cunard Countess.

In October 1982, after the conclusion of the Falklands War, the ship was chartered for six months by the Ministry of Defence (United Kingdom) to support troop movements between Ascension Island and the Falkland Islands while Port Stanley Airport was being reinstated. Families and friends of British personnel lost in the conflict were also carried on one round voyage, to enable commemorations both at sea and ashore. At the end of the charter, Cunard controversially awarded the contract for the refurbishment of the vessel to Malta Shipyards at a reported cost of £2 million. Cunard Countess returned to Caribbean cruising in July 1983.

In 1990 the ship's port of registry was changed to Nassau, Bahamas. In September of the same year, the ship made an audio on-air appearance on the television program Late Night with David Letterman when host David Letterman telephoned the ship as it prepared to leave Guadeloupe. The phone call was made as part of the show’s recurring “How's the Weather?” segment in which Letterman would call various locations using a phone book or similar registry and ask randomly selected individuals what the weather was like in their location. While the segment often involved Letterman using municipal phone books from various locations and selecting people at random, on this occasion the selection criteria was limited to ships at sea with phone reception capability and the Countess was selected at random from that list. Letterman then spoke on air to a crew member in the cruise director's office.

In 1996 – before Carnival's buy-out of Cunard in 1998 – Cunard Countess was sold to Awani Cruises and renamed Awani Dream II, to cruise along with the original Awani Dream. The Awani cruise company ran into financial trouble and in 1998 the ship moved to Royal Olympic Cruises, as Olympic Countess under the Greek flag.

Purchased in 2004 by Maximus Navigation, a subsidiary of Majestic International Cruises, she was renamed Ocean Countess and registered in Madeira on the International Shipping Register of Portugal. She was chartered as Ruby to Louis Cruise Lines in May 2007, resuming the name Ocean Countess in December of that year. During this employment, cruises usually departed from Piraeus, visiting destinations like Mykonos, Patmos, Crete and Santorini in Greece as well as Kuşadası in Turkey. During 2009 the ship was leased by the Spanish operator Quail Cruises for a series of Mediterranean cruises from Valencia.

In April 2010, the refitted Ocean Countess joined Marco Polo in an extensive cruise programme from British ports for the recently formed company Cruise & Maritime Voyages (CMV). In late 2012 Ocean Countess left the CMV fleet, with a final 13-night Canary Islands & Madeira "Farewell Voyage" which ended in Barcelona instead of returning to Liverpool; she was replaced by the MV Discovery.

On 30 November 2013 the central superstructure of the ship caught fire at Chalkis, Greece while laid up prior to an anticipated return to service in 2014. The five caretaker crew were all accounted for. She sustained heavy damage from waterline to funnel. She was to a scrapyard in Aliaga and departed Chalkis under tow on 7 March 2014.

== Facilities ==
The fully air-conditioned Ocean Countess had 7 passenger decks (passenger decks 3 to 7, 9 and sun terrace deck 10) plus three further crew-only decks (decks 1, 2 and bridge deck 8). There were deluxe cabins and suites as well as inner and outer standard cabins. All cabins featured private facilities. Passenger capacity was approximately 800 in 400 cabins with a crew of 350. A small number of cabins could be adjusted for guests with special requirements.

The sun terrace (top deck), exterior boat deck and aft lido deck were sheathed in traditional teak. The accommodation, public rooms and decks were refurbished and renamed with British themes in early 2010, in preparation for Ocean Countess' charter to Cruise & Maritime Voyages. New flat screen televisions with satellite channels were also installed in all cabins as part of the refurbishment.
