= Celestyal Cruises =

Cruise line

- Type: Privately held company
- Industry: Hospitality, travel, tourism
- Founder: Louis Group
- Headquarters: Piraeus, Athens, Greece
- Area served: Greece; Greek Islands; Turkey; Eastern Mediterranean
- Key people: David Noyes (Chairman); Chris Theophilides (CEO); George Koumpenas (COO); Lee Haslett (CCO); Marios Theodosiou (CFO); Eduardo Aranda (CSTO)
- Products: Cruise ships
- Parent: Searchlight Capital
- Website: https://celestyal.com

Celestyal Cruises, formed in 2014, is a Greek cruise line, and the successor to Louis Cruises and Louis Cruise Lines. It was a subsidiary of Louis plc (founded in 1935 as the first travel agency in Cyprus) until November 2021 when Searchlight Capital Partners took a majority share.

Celestyal Cruises has two cruise ships: the MS Celestyal Discovery and the MS Celestyal Journey. The cruise line operates out of Athens, Greece, offering itineraries on a 3-, 4-, and 7-night basis around the Greek islands, Turkey, and the Eastern Mediterranean. It is reported that it carried 115,000 guests in 2019. Celestyal Cruises operated for six years in Cuba until 2018 and historically chartered ships to Marella Cruises, previously Thomson Cruises.

== History ==
=== Louis Cruises ===
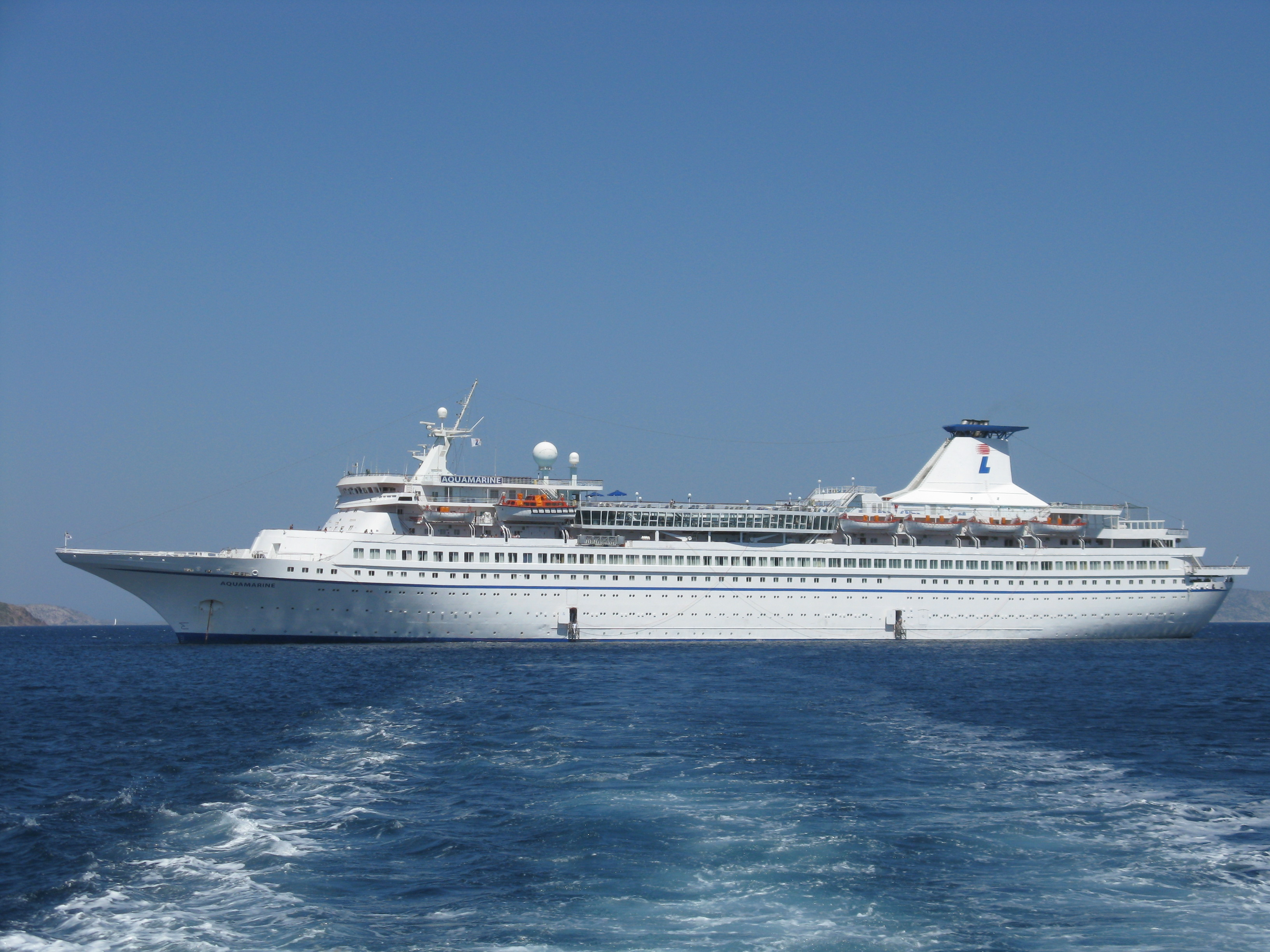
MV Aquamarine anchored off Patmos, Greece in July 2008.

Celestyal Cruises is a subsidiary of the Cyprus-based travel and tourism group Louis plc, that was founded in 1935 as the first travel agency in Cyprus. During the 1970s the company began chartering ferries for short cruises from Cyprus, which eventually led to the purchase of the cruiseferry MV Prinsessan from the Finland-based Birka Line for $4 million in 1987. Renamed MV Princesa Marissa, the ship started making cruises from Limassol to the Greek Isles, Egypt and Israel, under the then newly-established Louis Cruise Lines brand. By 1994 the company had acquired three more ships, all of which were used in the short cruise market from Cyprus.

In the mid-1990s, Louis Cruise Lines entered the business of chartering ships to other companies, including MV Princesa Oceanica (renamed Sapphire) to the UK-based Thomson Cruises in 1996. The following year the newly-acquired The Emerald was also chartered to Thomson. By 1994 the company had acquired three more ships, all of which were used in the short cruise market from Cyprus. In 1999 Louis chartered the 1998-acquired SS Ausonia to First Choice Holidays, one of Thomson's competitors in the UK market. By this time the Louis fleet consisted of a total of eight ships. Also in 1999, Louis acquired a stake in the Greek operator Royal Olympic Cruises. Royal Olympic was already in difficulties by the time Louis became involved with the company, and the 11 September 2001 attacks dealt a further blow, finally leading to the collapse of Royal Olympic in 2004.

During the early 2000s Louis further modernised their fleet by acquiring Calypso in 2000 and chartering MV Nieuw Amsterdam from Holland America Line in 2003, immediately sub-chartering her to Thomson as MV Thomson Spirit. In 2004 Louis acquired MV Aquamarine from the fleet of the UK-based Sun Cruises, which had gone out of business. Another former Sun Cruises ship, MV Thomson Destiny, was chartered from a Norway-based investment company and sub-chartered to Thomson Cruises. The new acquisitions also made possible the sale of three of Louis' older vessels. Also in 2004, following the collapse of Royal Olympic Cruises, Louis Cruise Lines purchased two of their former ships at bargain prices and established their own Louis Hellenic Cruises brand for the Greek cruise market.

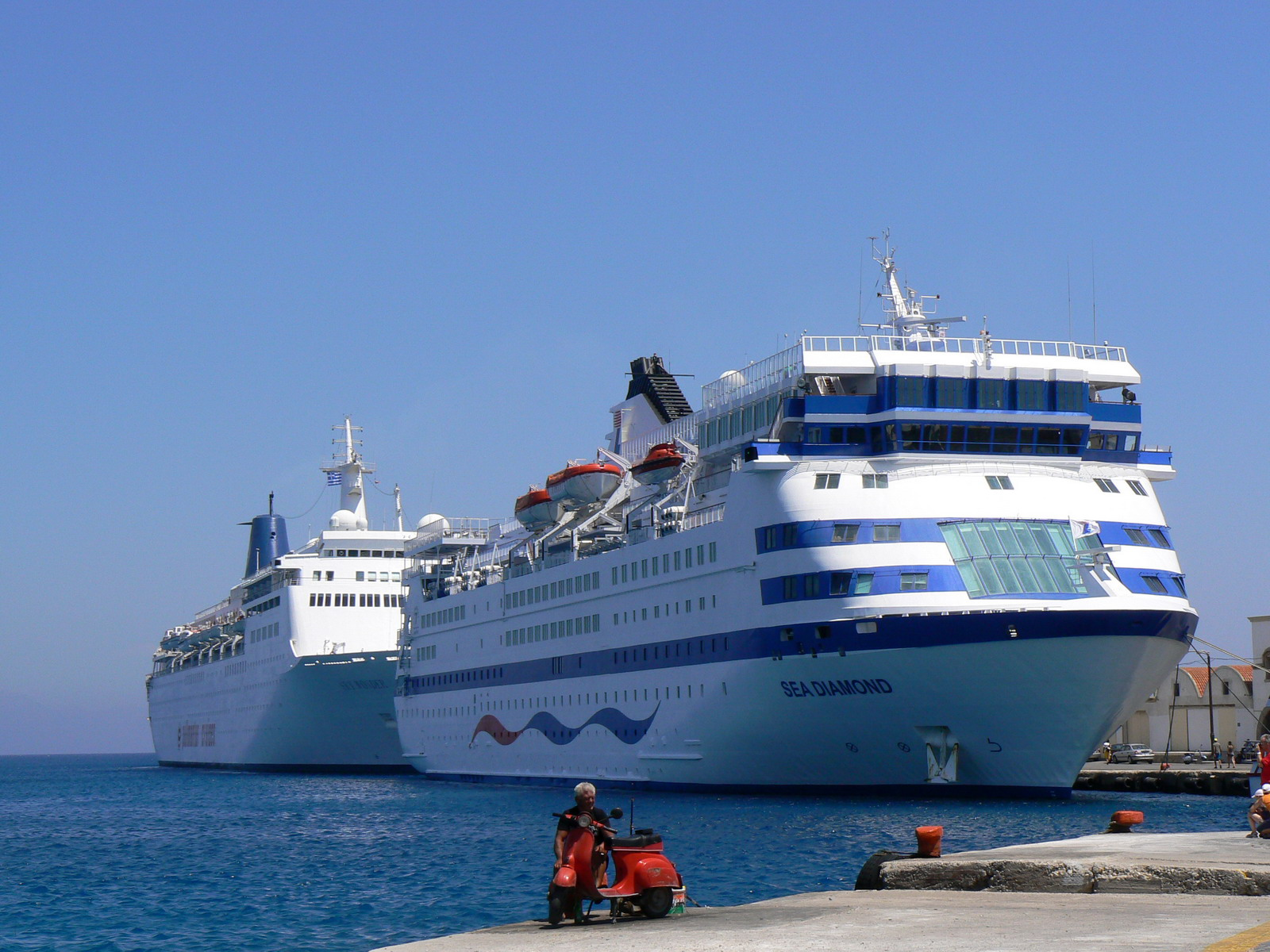
MV Sea Diamond was acquired in 2006, but sank off Santorini in 2007.

Further expansion came in 2006 with the purchase of MV Orient Queen and MV Sea Diamond, another former Baltic Sea cruise ferry purchased from Birka Line, while Calypso was chartered to Thomson and Aquamarine to Transocean Tours as Arielle. Additionally, Louis entered a franchise agreement with easyCruise to operate ships in the Eastern Mediterranean on their behalf in the future. Disaster struck in April 2007 when the Sea Diamond sunk off Santorini, Greece. All but two of the ship's passengers were safely evacuated, but the sinking resulted in a flurry of negative publicity for Louis. MV Oceanic II and MV Ruby were chartered as temporary replacements for the Sea Diamond, until MV Cristal – the former Silja Line cruise ship MV Silja Opera – entered service in July 2007. In 2008 the Arielle returned from her charter to Transocean Tours, and reverted to her earlier name Aquamarine, entering service under the Louis Hellenic Cruises brand.

In April 2008 Louis Cruise Lines agreed to purchase MV Norwegian Dream and MV Norwegian Majesty from Star Cruises. The agreement at the time was to charter the ships back to Star Cruises/Norwegian Cruise Line until November 2008 and December 2009, respectively. However, in September 2008 Louis cancelled the purchase of the Norwegian Dream due to "technical issues relating to the vessel". In May 2008 Louis Cruise Lines purchased Thomson Destiny and Thomson Spirit that had previously been operated under charter. At the same time Princesa Marissa and Serenade were sold for scrap.

In 2009 the company changed its name to Louis Cruises. In 2010 Louis Cruises became a five-ship fleet after the lay up of the SS The Emerald and MS Sapphire due to the SOLAS 2010 and the selling of the MV Aquamarine in order to renew the fleet.

In 2012 a new charter agreement with Thomson Cruises provided that MS Louis Majesty would switch over and be on charter until 2017. In return, the Thomson Destiny would return to the Louis fleet as Louis Olympia. She would then be deployed on 3/4-day sailings out of Piraeus and Kusadasi to the Greek Islands and Turkey.

The MS Sapphire was sold for scrap in May 2012, as were SS The Emerald in August 2012, and The Calypso later in the year. All three ships were laid up for two years due to SOLAS 2010. The Coral was scrapped in late 2013, and the Louis Cristal was charted to Cuba Cruises, but still operating under the Louis brand. In early 2014, Louis Cruises announced a new livery. All Louis ships would receive a Louis Cruises logo on their white hull, along with a red and blue stripe next to it. The Louis Olympia was the first ship to receive the new livery in early February 2014.

=== 2015 ===
Celestyal renovated some of its fleet in 2015. 43 new balconies were added to Celestyal Crystal, and 227 outside cabins, 21 junior suites, and nine suites were refurbished on Celestyal Olympia. The former was used for cruises in both Cuba and Greece, but the latter in Greece only.

=== 2016 ===
In July, Celestyal imposed a short-term pause in calls at Turkish ports in the wake of the failed coup there.

In October, it was announced that Celestyal Cruises' CEO, Kyriakos Anastassiadis, would become Chairman of Cruise Lines International Association Europe with effect from January 2017.

=== 2017 ===
In May, Celestyal launched its redesigned website which was designed to include cruise information as well as company news and details for its value program, Celestyal Inclusive Experience.

Celestyal began a partnership with Hays Travel in September to expand its customer base across the UK, making its cruises available through Hays Tour Operating Limited. Celestyal also partnered with Air Canada Vacations, Transat, Hola Sun Holidays, Apple Vacations, Iglu and Planet Cruise.

In late 2017, Celestyal announced that it would be extending its cruise season in Greece to 10 months, including seven-night Aegean cruises with overnight destinations in Mykonos and Santorini, and that its 2019 Greek islands itineraries leaving from Piraeus, would have longer stays with more destinations, included Mykonos, Samos or Kusadasi, Patmos, Heraklion (Crete), Rhodes and Santorini. Louis Cruises intended to add their Majesty to the Celestyal fleet in Greece for Aegean cruises in 2018, when its charter to Marella Cruises, previously Thomson Cruises, had ended, but in July 2018, the ship was sold to the Israeli company Mano Maritime.

=== 2018 ===
In January, Celestyal decided to pull out of Cuba after five seasons, citing the company's need to focus on the growing demand coming from its Greek operation.

In June, Chris Theophilides succeeded Kyriakos Anastasiadis as Celestyal's CEO, and in August Capt. George Koumpenas was promoted to Chief Operating Officer and Leslie Peden to Chief Commercial Officer. The company announced in December 2018 that it was targeting a 21 percent growth in guest numbers from 108,000 in 2018 to a targeted number of 130,000 guests in 2019.

=== 2019 ===
In April, Celestyal announced that it would be extending its 2020 season with a new winter itinerary for Celestyal Olympia, with a six-week season in the Adriatic homeporting at Venice from December 2020.

=== 2020 ===
In January 2020, Celestyal Cruises' president Kostakis Loizou was honoured for his significant contribution to the Greek cruise industry during the annual general assembly of the Association of Cruise Ship Owners and Maritime Agencies (EEKFN). In February Theophilides revealed that the cruise line's estimated contribution to the Greek economy for 2014-2018 had reached €102.5 million annually. He noted that €28m was in direct operating expenditure and €4.1m to Greek food and beverage suppliers.

In November, Celestyal Cruises announced it had completed a brand refresh with a new logo and strapline - Experience Life, Experience the Journey. The new-look brand would debut on its new flagship Celestyal Experience. Peter Economides, owner and founder of brand creator Felix BNI said, "We wanted to capture the Greek DNA through the Greek love of life and to express it in a modernized interpretation of the brand design."

The cruise programme was severely disrupted in 2020 and 2021 by the COVID-19 pandemic.

=== 2021 ===
In January 2021 Celestyal Cruises entered a new partnership with Versonix Corporation to provide its Seaware booking platform to the cruise line. It was said that Versonix was chosen due to Seaware's enhanced revenue management and customer relationship management capabilities.

Celestyal announced in October that it would return to cruising on 14 March 2022 with its offering of 3- and 4-night cruises followed by 7-night cruises in April. In November they said that Thessaloniki would be added as a homeport for its Idyllic Aegean itinerary.

Also in November, Searchlight Capital Partners bought a majority stake in Celestyal Cruises. Louis plc, Celestyal's Cypriot parent, said that Searchlight, which had an asset portfolio valued at $6bn, would immediately provide an initial tranche of €30m ($33.8) in senior debt financing to the Piraeus-based cruise company, together with a €10m revolving credit facility. The agreement also provided for additional funding of up to €30m to support development plans. Louis would spin off Celestyal into a separate limited partnership company, Celestyal Holdings, in which Searchlight would hold a 60% stake.

== COVID-19 Pandemic ==
As a consequence of the pandemic, Celestyal Cruises suspended all cruises from 13 March 2020, and it was later decided to extend the suspension until 6 March 2021, due to the ongoing uncertainty about travelling to Europe that summer.

Celestyal resumed cruises in June 2021 with its Idyllic Aegean itinerary. Celestyal Cruises put Celestyal Olympia into operation as a second ship in June 2021 with a new itinerary - Legendary Archipelago, visiting Thessaloniki, Mykonos, Santorini, Agios Nikolaos and Rhodes as well as Limassol in Cyprus. In August Celestyal announced that it would stop cruises at the end of August 2021 and suspend its autumn and winter seasons due to the increasing number of travel restrictions.

In October 2021, Celestyal Cruises announced that it would restart cruises on 14 March of 2022 with their offering of 3- and 4-night cruises followed by 7-night cruises on 30 April.

During the COVID-19 pandemic in 2020, Celestyal Cruises acquired the former Costa neoRomantica from Costa Cruises, and the vessel was renamed Celestyal Experience in August of that year. A year later, the company said, "due to the prolonged effects of the ongoing COVID-19 pandemic, it was decided not to increase the size of Celestyal Cruises' fleet at this time but would instead continue to operate the cruise ships Celestyal Olympia and Celestyal Crystal which served the company's needs well prior to the pandemic. In addition, the sale of Celestyal Experience] was expected to further support the liquidity of Celestyal Cruises." The ship was renamed Antares Experience by the new owners, but sent for scrapping in November 2021.

== Awards ==
At the 2015 Greek Tourism Awards, Celestyal received four awards, one of which was the Gold Award for Themed Events. It also received two Silver Awards and one Bronze Award. The following year, it won the Cruise Line Revelation Award at the Excellence Awards in Cartagena, Spain. Celestyal received the Best Value Cruise Line of 2016 at Cruise Critic UK Editors' Picks Awards, as well as four Greek Tourism Awards in 2016.

Also in 2017, Celestyal received five top Cruise Critic Cruisers' Choice Awards, as well as five awards at the Greek Tourism Awards.

=== Cruise Critic Awards ===
In December 2017, Cruise Critic UK Editors' Picks Awards recognized Celestyal with Best for Service. Marella Spirit also received three Cruise Critic UK Editors' Picks Awards.

Cruise Critic UK Editors' Picks Award in December 2018 awarded Celestyal Cruises for Best for Service and received four Cruise Critic Cruisers' Choice Awards: two first-place awards (for Shore Excursions and Value) and two second-place awards (for Service and Entertainment).

In December 2019 Cruise Critic's 11th UK Editors' Picks Awarded Celestyal Cruises Best for Service 2019.

=== MedCruise Awards ===
In August 2020, Celestyal Cruises was awarded first prize at the MedCruise Awards 2020 for its solidarity initiatives amid the pandemic and its commitment to develop the cruise sector in the Eastern Mediterranean.

== TV Coverage ==
=== Cruising with Jane McDonald ===
Celestyal was featured in the final episode of the second season of Jane McDonald's Channel 5 show, Cruising with Jane McDonald in 2017. McDonald went on a Cuban cruise that stopped in Cienfuegos, Santiago de Cuba and Montego Bay, Jamaica with an overnight in Havana.

In January 2019 it was announced that the new series of Cruising with Jane McDonald would feature Celestyal's Idyllic Aegean Cruise featuring the Greek Islands.

=== Music Videos ===
In June 2017, Greek urban pop band "REC" were onboard Celestyal Olympia to shoot the summer scenes of its new video clip entitled "A heart on the sand".

== Fleet ==
=== Current Ships ===
Ship	Flag	Built	Entered Service	Gross tonnage	Notes	Image
Celestyal Journey	Malta	1994	2023	55,819 GT	Ex-Ryndam with Holland America Line	
Celestyal Discovery	Malta	2003	2024	42,289 GT	Ex-AIDAaura with AIDA Cruises	

=== Former Fleet ===
Ship	Built	Builder	In service with Celestyal Cruises	Gross tonnage	Flag	Notes	Image
Celestyal Olympia	1982	Wärtsilä Hietalahti Helsinki, Finland	2005, 2012–2023	37,584 GT	Malta	Scrapped in Alang under name Bella Fortuna	
Celestyal Crystal	1992	Wärtsilä Marine/Kvaerner Masa-Yards	2007–2023	25,611 tons	Malta	arrived in Alang to be scrapped in May 2025	
Celestyal Experience	1993	Fincantieri	2020–2021 (Never entered service)	56,769 tons	Malta	Ex-Costa neoRomantica. The ship was bought from Costa Cruises, joined in August 2020, but was sold one year later. It was sold for scrap in 2021 by the next owner.	
Majesty	1992	Wärtsilä Marine/Kvaerner Masa-Yards	2008–2018	40,876 tons	Malta	Now named MS Crown Iris for Mano Maritime.	
Celestyal Odyssey	2000	Blohm + Voss	2015–2016	24,318 tons	Malta	Now named Blue Star Dream for Blue Dream Cruises, China.	
Celestyal Nefeli	1992	Unión Naval de Levante	2016–2017	19,093 tons	Malta	Now named Gemini for Miray Cruises.	
Marella Spirit	1983	Chantiers de l'Atlantique	2002–2003	33,930 tons	Malta	It was chartered to Marella Cruises until 2018; previously Thomson Spirit, Patriot, Spirit, and Nieuw Amsterdam. Sold for scrap at Alang under the name Mare S in 2018	
Princesa Marissa	1966	Hietalahti shipyard	1987–2008	10,487 tons	Cyprus	Previously named Prisessan and Finnhansa. Scrapped at Alang under the name Prince in 2008.	
Princesa Amorosa	1956	Harland & Wolff	1994–2002	? tons	Cyprus	Previously named Scottish Coast, Galaxias and pink. Scrapped at Alang under the name Rosa in 2002.	
Louis Aura	1968	AG Weser	2006–2017	15,781 tons	Malta	Previously named Starward, Bolero, Orient Queen and Aegean Queen. Scrapped at Alang under the name Aegean in 2018.	
Sea Diamond	1986	Vuosaari shipyard	2006–2007	21,484 tons	Greece	Previously named Birka Princess. Sank near Santorini on 2007.	
Sapphire	1965	Cantieri Navale Felszegi	1996–2012	12,263 tons	Malta	Previously named Italia for Costa Crociere sold for scrap at Alang under the name Aspire in 2012.	
Princessa Victoria	1936	Harland & Wolff	1994–2004	15,007 tons	Cyprus	Previously named Dunnottar Castle, sold for scrap at Alang under the name Victoria in 2004.	
Princessa Cypria	1965	Cantieri Navali del Torrino e Riuniti S.P.A. Riva Trigoso Genova	1988–2005	? tons	Cyprus	Previously named Princess Marghethe, sold for scrap at Alang under the name Princes in 2005.	
The Emerald	1957	Newport News Shipbuilding and Drydock	1996–2012	26,431 tons	Greece	Previously named Santa Rosa. Sold for scrap at Alang in 2012.	
Ausonia	1956	Cantieri Riuniti dell' Adriatico	1998–2006	11,879 tons	Greece	Previously named Ausonia. Sold for scrap at Alang under the name Winner 5 in 2006.	
Serenade	1956	Chantiers de l'Atlantique	1999–2008	14,173 tons	Bahamas	Previously named Jean Mermoz. Sold for scrap at Alang under the name Serena in 2008.	
The Calypso	1967	Fincantieri	2000–2013	11,162 tons	Greece	Previously named Canguro Verde. Sold for scrap at Alang under the name Caly in 2013.	
Perla/The Aegean Queen	1971	Cantiere navale di Riva Trigoso	2004–2008	16,710 tons	Greece	Previously named MS Southward. Sold for scrap at Aliağa, Turkey in 2013.	
Coral	1971	De Rotterdamsche Droogdok, Rotterdam, Netherlands	2004–2013	14,194 tons	Greece	Previously named Cunard Adventurer. Sold for scrap at Alang under the name Cora in 2014.	
Aquamarine	1970	Hietalahti shipyard	2005–2010	18,346 tons	Greece	Previously named Nordic Prince. Sold for scrap at Alang, India in 2014.	
Ruby	1974	Navali Mechaniche Affini, La Spezia, Italy	2007–2007	17,593 tons	Cyprus	Previously named Cunard Countess, after named Ocean Countess. Sold for scrap at Aliağa, Turkey in 2014.	
