= MS Southward =

Cruise ship built in 1971

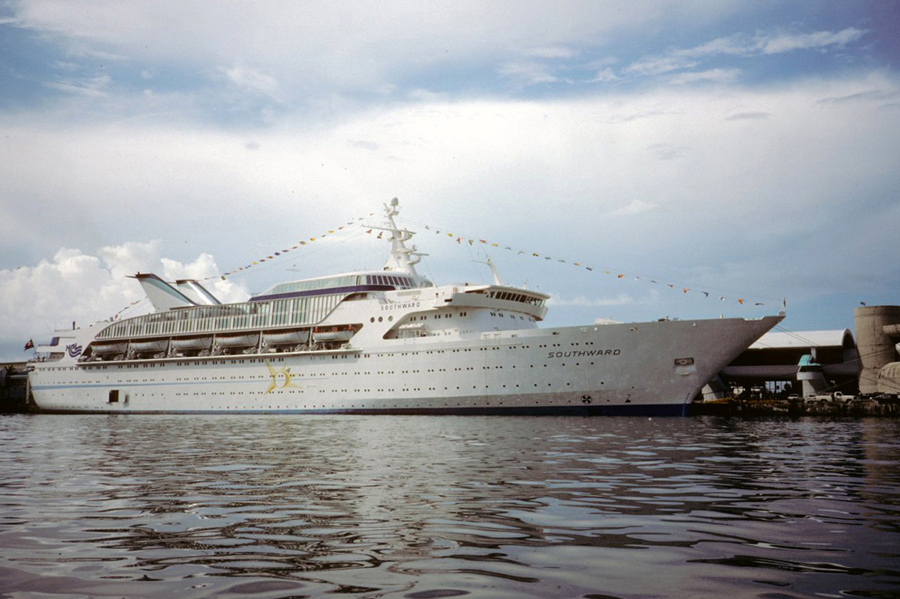
- MS Southward moored at the PortMiami, on 22 May 1981

History
- Name: MS Southward (1971–1995); Seawing (1995–2005); Perla (2005–2008); The Aegean Pearl (2008–2010); Rio (2010–2012); Venus (2012–2013)
- Owner: Norwegian Cruise Line (1971–1994); Sun Cruises (1994–2004); Louis Cruises (2004–2005); Golden Star Cruises (2005–2010); Rio Cruises (2010–2011); Venus Cruise Lines (2012–2013)
- Operator: Norwegian Cruise Line (1971–1994); Airtours (1994–2004); Louis Cruise Lines (2004–2005); Pearl Navigation, Ltd. (2008–2009); Eagles Shipholding SA (2010–2011); Mediterranean Cruises, Ltd.
- Port of registry: 1971–1987: Oslo, Norway; 1987–2005: Nassau, Bahamas; 2005–2010: Piraeus, Greece; 2010–2013: Valletta, Malta; 2013: Lomé, Togo
- Ordered: 1971
- Builder: Cantiere navale di Riva Trigoso
- Yard number: 288
- Launched: June 5, 1971
- Christened: November 30, 1971
- Completed: 1971
- Maiden voyage: November 30, 1971
- In service: 1971
- Out of service: 2013
- Identification: IMO number: 7111078
- Fate: Sold for scrap in 2013

General characteristics
- Tonnage: 16,710 GRT
- Length: 536 ft (163 m)
- Beam: 75 ft (23 m)
- Decks: 8
- Installed power: Fyra Fiat SGM10 Diesel
- Speed: 22 knots (41 km/h; 25 mph)
- Capacity: 802
- Crew: 302

MS Southward was a cruise ship owned by Norwegian Cruise Line, operated between 1971 and 1994, and later on to other cruise liners until she ended operation in 2013.

== History ==
Southward was NCL's fourth cruise ship, the others being Sunward (1966), Starward (1968), and Skyward (1969). Initially, she was operated on Caribbean cruises out of Miami. In 1987, she was dispatched to the west coast of the United States to begin operating out of Los Angeles (San Pedro) on three and four-night cruises to Catalina Island, San Diego and Ensenada, BC, Mexico. As a result of this move, Norwegian Caribbean Line changed its name to Norwegian Cruise Line (NCL) in late 1987.

The Southward was featured on episodes 315 and 316 of Baywatch, which originally aired on January 25, 1993, and February 1, 1993, respectively.

By 1994, she was sold off to Sun Cruises, a cruise division of the UK-based travel company Airtours, and renamed Seawing. She cruised for seven nights through the Mediterranean during the spring/summer season and the Far East in the winter season. Later on, Seawing ran fourteen, sixteen, and thirty-night cruises from 2002 and 2003.

From 2004, she joined the Louis Cruise Lines fleet, under the name of Perla. In 2005, she operated cruises out of Piraeus to the Greek Islands and Turkey, after a winter in the Far East. In May 2008, she was chartered to Golden Sun Cruises (a Greece-based company) and renamed The Aegean Pearl, operating between three and four night cruises from Piraeus. After the charter ended with Golden Sun Cruises in 2009, she returned to Louis Cruises with her name remaining unchanged.

In 2010, she was transferred to Rio Cruises and renamed Rio, and again in 2012, was sold off to Venus Cruise Lines and renamed Venus. She was scrapped in 2013.
