= MS Celestyal Olympia =

Cruise ship

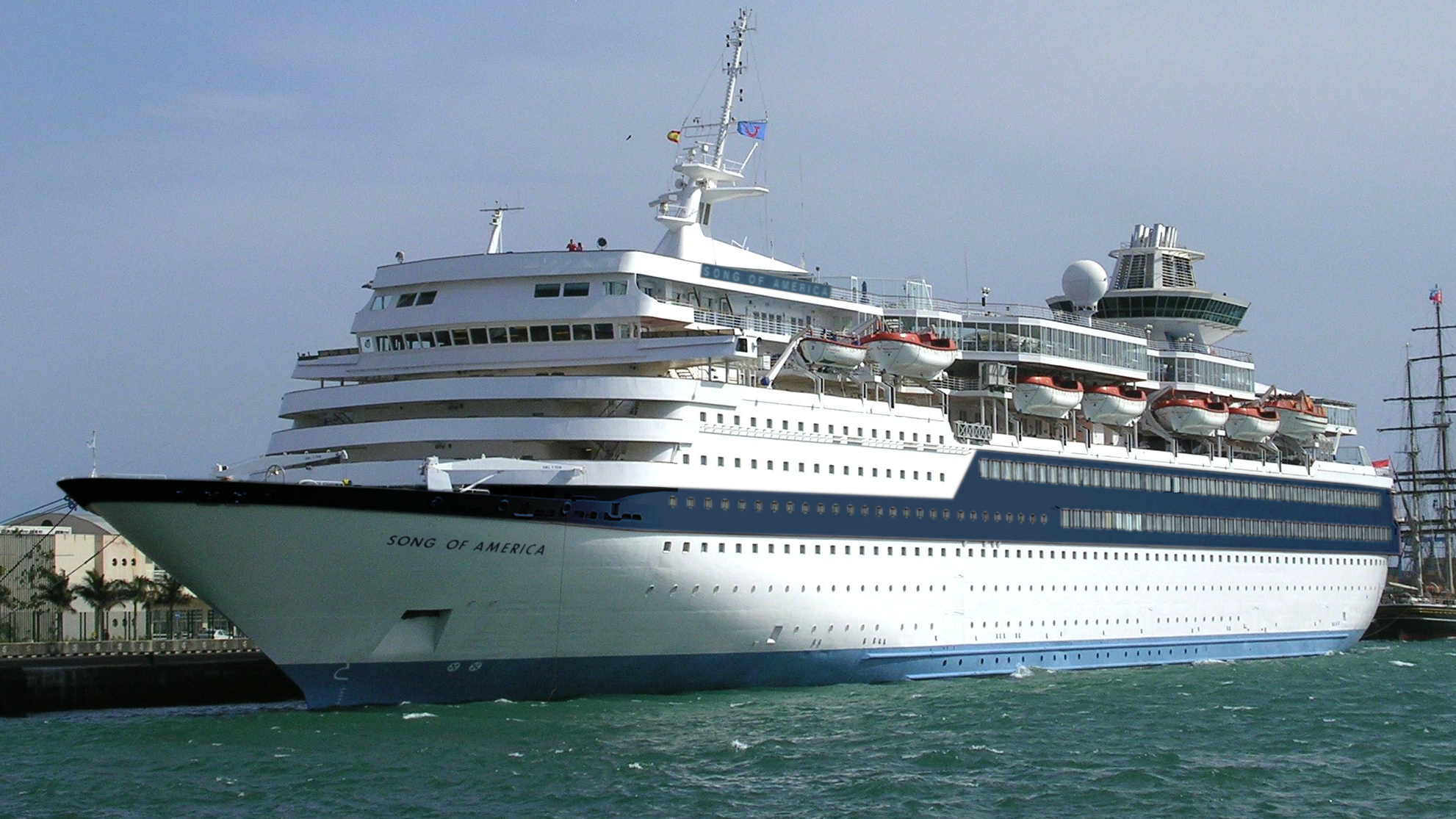
- The ship as Song of America in 1982

History
- Name: 1982–1999: Song of America; 1999–2005: Sunbird; 2005–2012: Thomson Destiny; 2012–2014: Louis Olympia; 2014–2024: Celestyal Olympia; 2024-2025: Bella Fortuna; 2025: Fortu
- Owner: 1982–1999: Royal Caribbean Cruise Line; 1999–2004: Airtours; 2004–2025: Searchlight Capital; 2005–2012: Med Cruise AS; 2012–2024: Destiny Trading Opco; 2024–2025: Voyage Shipping Inc; 2025 : Marine Line Ltd
- Operator: 1982–1999: Royal Caribbean Cruise Line; 1999–2005: Sun Cruises; 2005–2012: Thomson Cruises; 2012–2025: Celestyal Cruises
- Port of registry: 1982–1999: Oslo, Norway; 1999–2004: Nassau, Bahamas; 2004–2005: Limassol, Cyprus; 2005: Majuro, Marshall Islands; 2005–2012: Limassol, Cyprus; 2012–2024: Valletta, Malta; 2024–2025: Monrovia, Liberia; 2025: Moroni, Comoros
- Ordered: 1 November 1979
- Builder: Wärtsilä Hietalahti shipyard, Helsinki, Finland
- Cost: $140 million
- Yard number: 431
- Laid down: 17 February 1981
- Launched: 26 November 1981
- Completed: 9 November 1982
- Acquired: 11 November 1982
- Maiden voyage: 1982
- In service: 5 December 1982
- Out of service: November 2023
- Identification: IMO number: 7927984; Call sign: 9HA3027; DNV ID: 12706; MMSI number: 229051000
- Fate: Scrapped

General characteristics (as built)
- Type: Cruise ship
- Tonnage: 37,584 GT; 5,237 DWT
- Length: 214.51 m (703 ft 9 in)
- Beam: 28.41 m (93 ft 3 in)
- Draught: 6.80 m (22 ft 4 in)
- Decks: 11
- Installed power: 4 × 8-cylinder Sulzer-Wärtsilä diesels; 17,060 kW (combined)
- Propulsion: Twin propellers
- Speed: 21 knots (39 km/h; 24 mph)
- Capacity: 1,575 passengers
- Crew: 540

General characteristics (as Thomson Destiny)
- Tonnage: 37,773 GT; 5,000 DWT
- Decks: 12
- Capacity: 1,664 passengers
- Crew: 540

MS Celestyal Olympia was a cruise ship owned by the Cyprus-based Celestyal Cruises, formerly Louis Cruise Lines. In April 2012 she was named Louis Olympia after operating as the Thomson Destiny for Thomson Cruises. She was built in 1982 at Wärtsilä Hietalahti shipyard in Helsinki, Finland for Royal Caribbean Cruise Lines as MS Song of America. Between 1999 and 2004 she sailed for Sun Cruises as MS Sunbird. She was previously under charter to the United Kingdom-based Thomson Cruises until April 2012 as the MS Thomson Destiny. She has since sailed for Louis Cruises as MS Louis Olympia, and as MS Celestyal Olympia since 2014. She was scrapped in 2025.

== Concept and construction ==
Royal Caribbean Cruise Lines had operated throughout the 1970s with three ships that had been built at the Wärtsilä Hietalahti shipyard in Helsinki, Finland. Two of these had been lengthened towards the end of the decade, but due to increased demand RCCL decided to order a larger new ship, again from the Wärtsilä Helsinki shipyard.

For the interior layout of their new ship Royal Caribbean decided to adapt a system with cabins to the fore of the ship, furthest from engine noise, and public spaces to aft. This layout was widely used on ferries built by the Wärtsilä shipyard, but has been rarely used for cruise ships. The public spaces on decks five and seven were built with 1½ times the standard deck height, leading to deck 6 only existing in the forward part of the ship. The Song of America would also be the first ship to have a Viking Crown lounge completely encircling the funnel, providing 360 degree views, and accessible by interior stairs and lifts.

The interior design of the public rooms was done by Mogens Hammer, who would continue the Broadway themed public rooms, similar to the prior ships in the fleet. The ship was innovative with its main show lounge, being one of the first use of structural web frames instead of multiple columns, improving the sightlines greatly compared to other ships.

The Song of America was launched from drydock on 26 November 1981. Following fitting out she was delivered to her owners on 11 November 1982, ten years after the previous Sun Viking.

== History ==
=== 1982–1999: Song of America ===
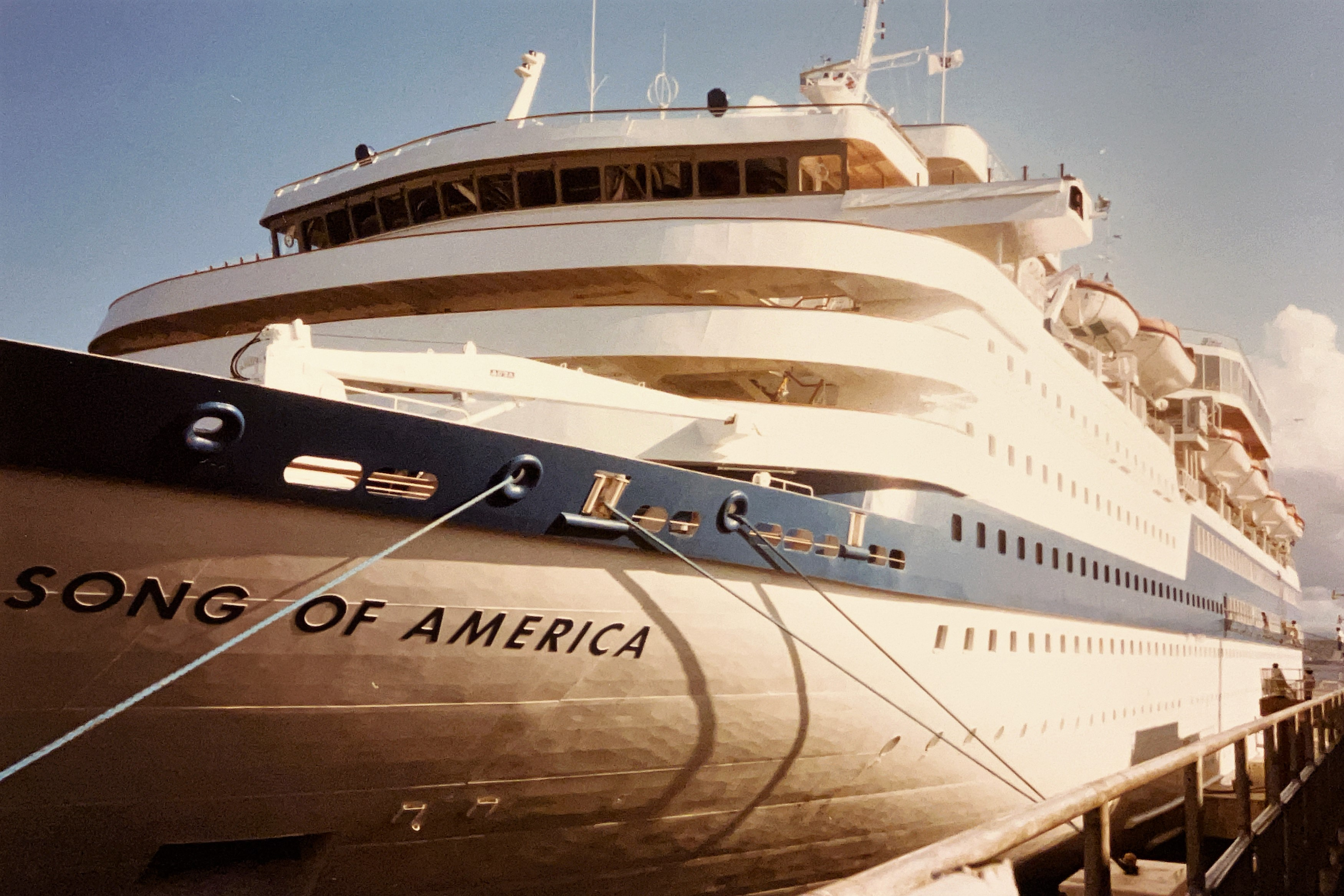
Song of America docked at Saint Thomas in November 1983

Following a voyage across the Atlantic, the Song of America entered service with Royal Caribbean Cruise Lines on 5 December 1982. The ship was named by opera singer Beverly Sills, and the maiden voyage included former President Jimmy Carter and his wife Rosalyn on a cruise from Miami to Nassau, San Juan and Saint Thomas. This remained her main itinerary for the early parts of her career with Royal Caribbean. Beginning the early 1990s the ship would take over the New York - Bermuda run during the summer months.

=== 1999–2005: Sunbird ===
In May 1998, the Song of America was sold to Sun Cruises, a subsidiary of Airtours. Sun Cruises then chartered the ship back to Royal Caribbean until March 1999. Unlike with earlier ships the Royal Caribbean sold, the 'sky lounge' around the ship's funnel was not removed before she was handed over to the new owners.

The ship was renamed Sunbird, rebuilt with additional suites on deck 9 and used for cruising around Europe, mainly in the Mediterranean. Later during her Sun Cruises service the ship received MyTravel colours. In 2004, Airtours decided to withdraw from the cruise business, and the Sunbird was sold to Louis Cruise Lines, who chartered her back to Sun Cruises until May 2004.

=== 2005–2012: Thomson Destiny ===
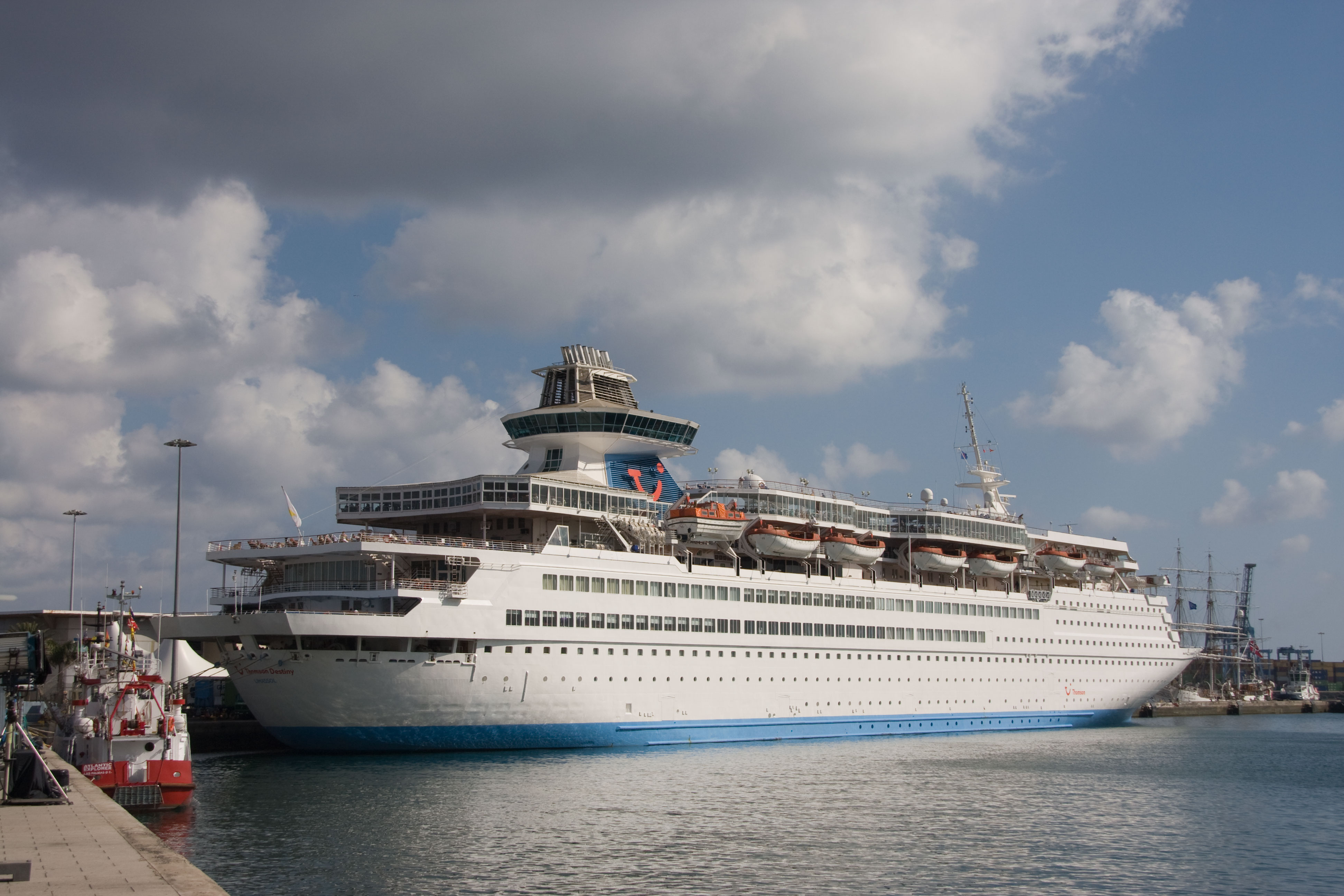
Thomson Destiny docked in Las Palmas in January 2012

Following the end of her charter to Sun Cruises, Louis Cruise Lines chartered the Sunbird to Thomson Cruises, who renamed her Thomson Destiny. With Thomson, the ship was used for cruising in the Mediterranean, Red Sea, Canary Islands and the west coast of Africa. In the winter of 2004 she cruised in the Caribbean.

=== 2012–2014: Louis Olympia ===
Thomson Destiny returned to Louis Cruises in April 2012 and started operating under its new name Louis Olympia. She is used on Aegean cruises, to the Aegean Island and the Turkish coast, with its home port being Piraeus.

=== 2014: Floating hotel ===
Louis Olympia was used as a floating hotel during the 2014 Winter Olympics in Sochi, Russia.

=== 2014–2024: Celestyal Olympia ===
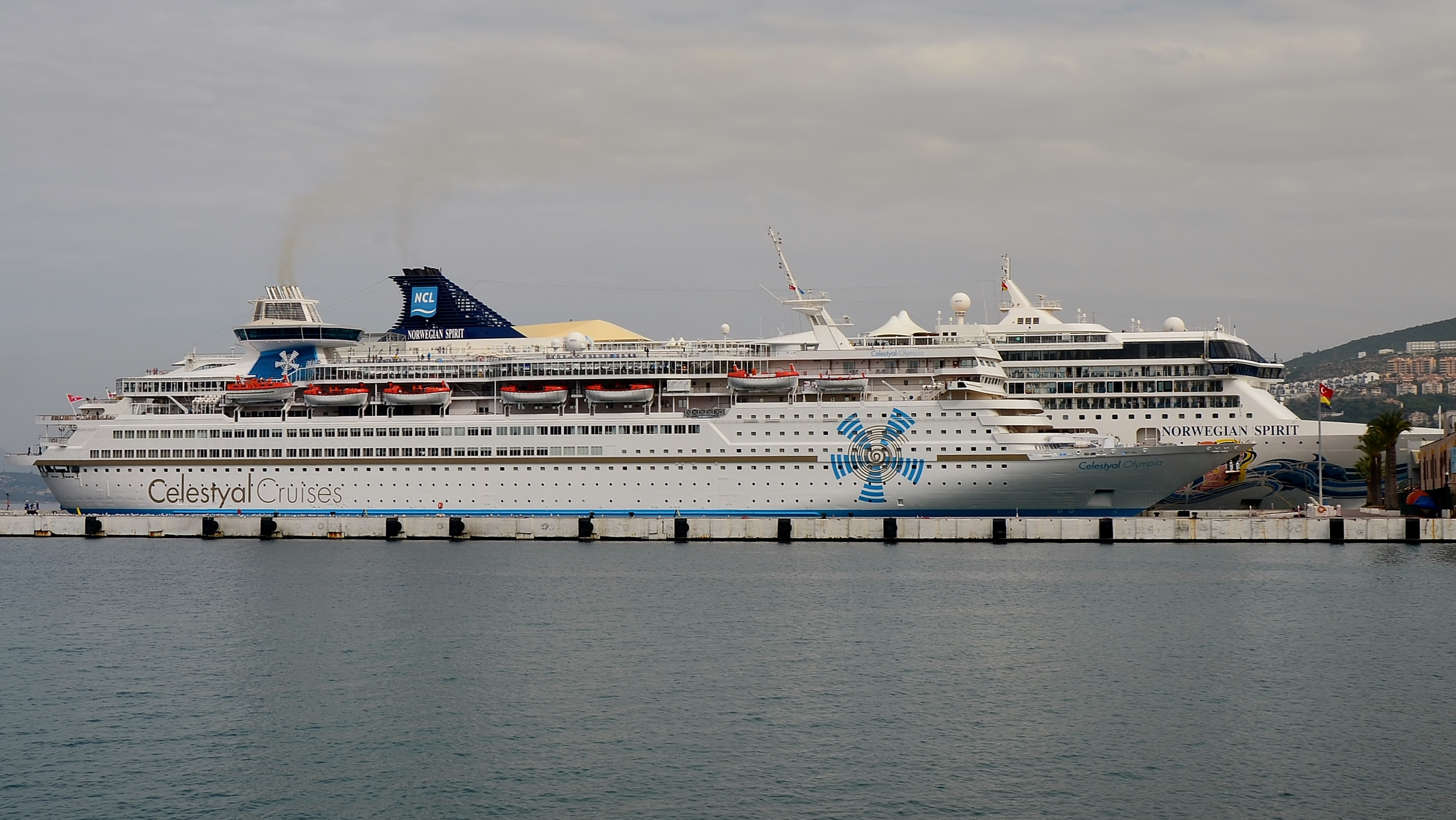
Celestyal Olympia docked in Kuşadası, Turkey with Norwegian Spirit in October 2015

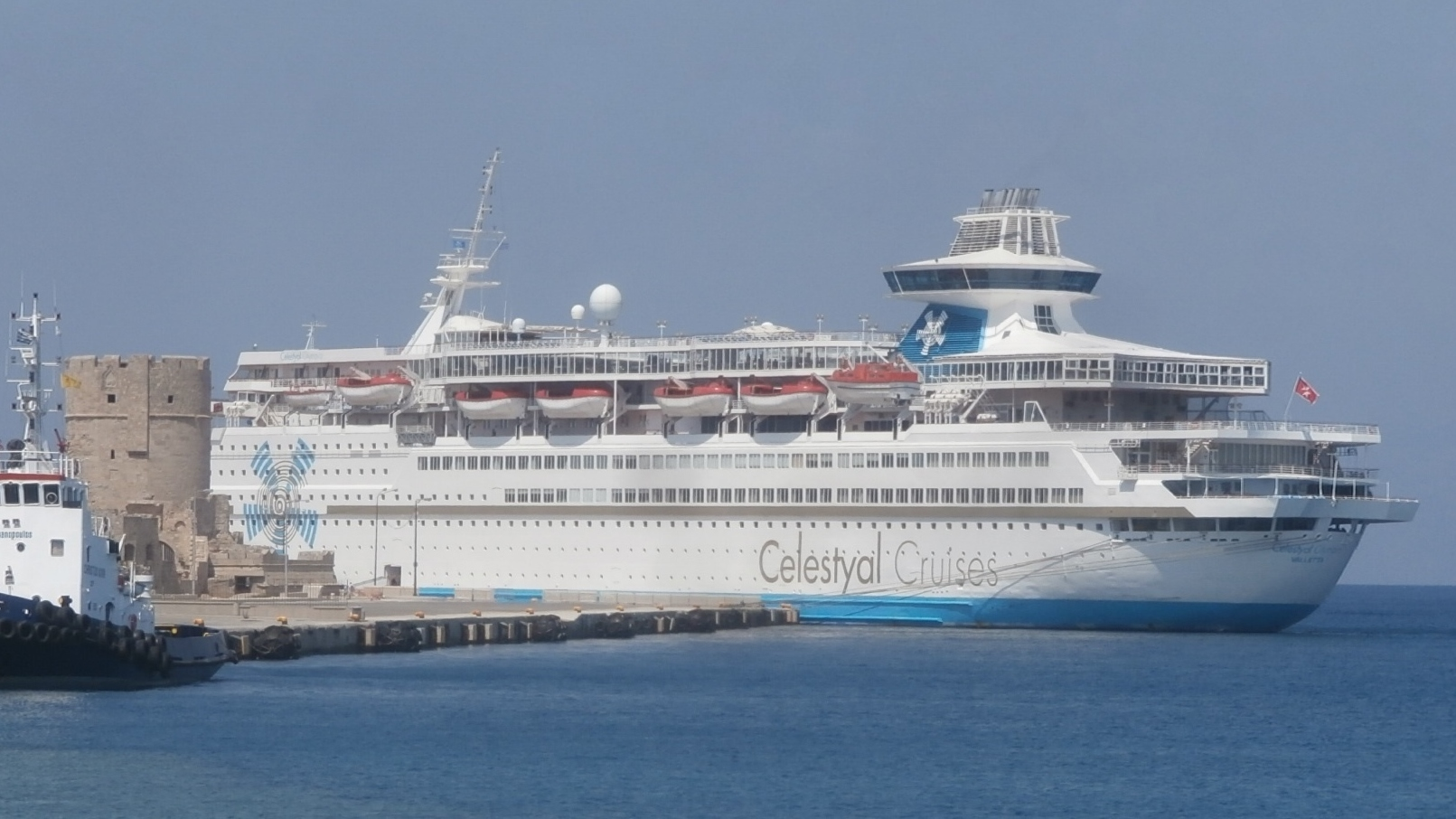
Celestyal Olympia moored at Quay in Rhodes in September 2019

As part of Louis Cruise Lines re-branding in late 2014, the ship was renamed Celestyal Olympia with an updated livery, to reflect the new corporate identity. Due to the COVID-19 pandemic all cruises from 16 March 2020 to 6 March 2021 were suspended. The ship resumed service on 28 June 2021, cruising the Greek Isles.

The ship was laid up at Lavrion in late 2023, following the announcement of Celestyal acquiring the former AIDAaura (renamed Celestyal Discovery) to replace Celestyal Olympia in March 2024. In January 2024, following sale, Celestyal Olympia was renamed Bella Fortuna under the Liberian flag, and moved to Çeşme, Turkey. The ship left Çeşme on 26 April 2024 and arrived at Ras Al Khaimah, United Arab Emirates, on 15 May.

After being renamed Fortu under the Comoros flag in early January 2025, she left Ras Al Khaimah in tow on 21 January, and arrived at Alang Ship Breaking Yard, India on 2 February to be dismantled.
