= SS Ausonia (1956) =

Ocean liner

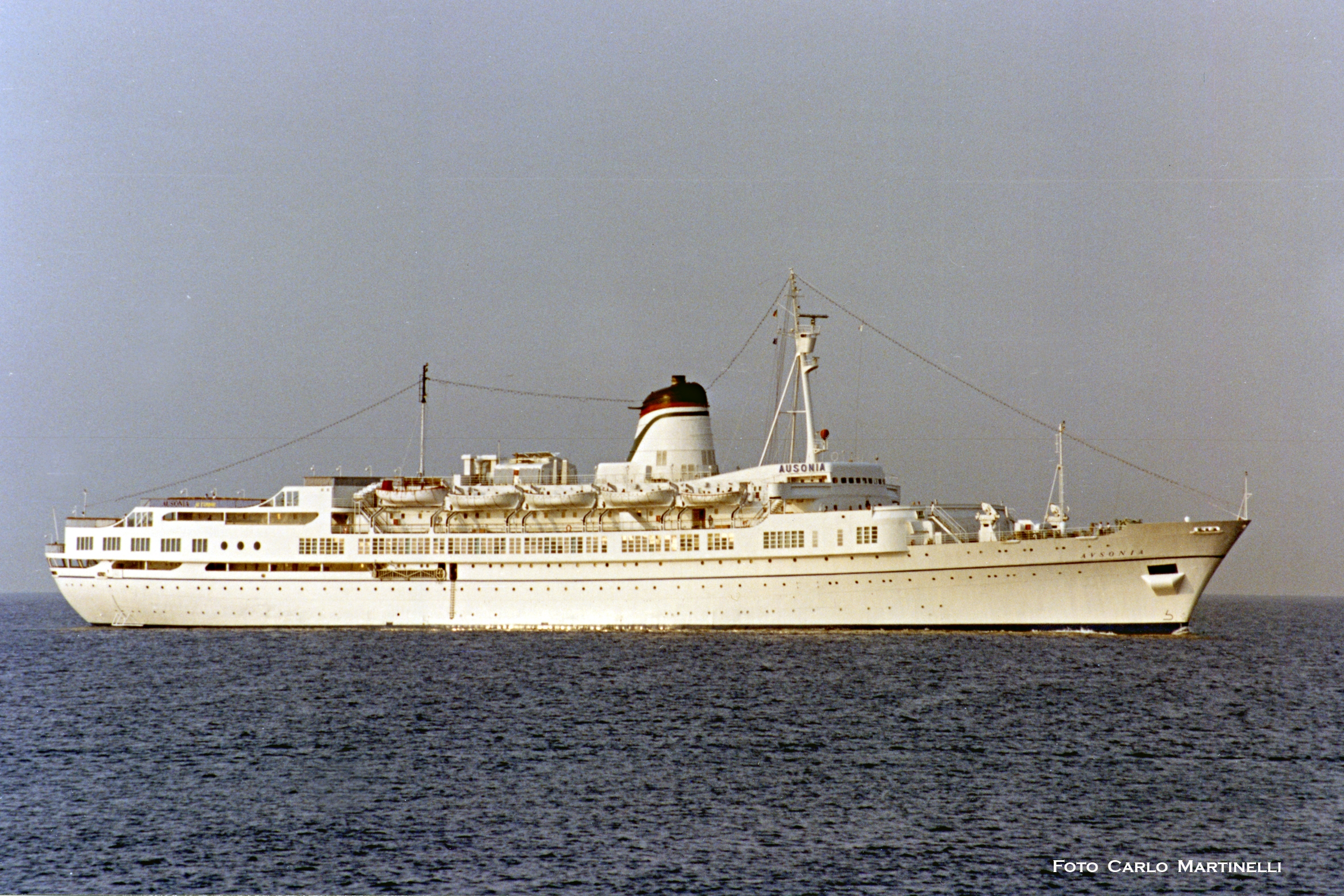
- Ausonia arriving in Genoa, on July 29, 1989

History
- Name: 1956–2006: Ausonia; 2006–2006: The Ausonia; 2006–2007: Ivory; 2007–2008: Aegean Two; 2008–2010: Ivory; 2010–2010: Winner 5
- Owner: 1956–1978: Adriatica Lines; 1978–1998: Italian Line; 1998–2005: Louis Cruise Lines; 2005–2009: Golden Star Cruises
- Operator: 1956–1978: Adriatica Lines; 1978–1998: Italian Line; 1998–2000: Louis Cruise Lines; 2000–2002: First Choice Holidays; 2002–2005: Louis Cruise Lines; 2005–2009: Golden Star Cruises
- Port of registry: 1956–1998: Italy; 1998–2005: Cyprus, Greece; 2005–2009: Unknown
- Builder: Cantieri Riuniti dell' Adriatico
- Laid down: 1955
- Launched: 5 August 1956
- Completed: 1957
- In service: 1957
- Out of service: 2009
- Identification: IMO number: 5031078
- Fate: Scrapped in Alang, India, 2010
- Notes: One of the last vintage liners to sail as a cruise ship

General characteristics
- Tonnage: 11,879 gross register tons (GRT)
- Length: 522 ft
- Beam: 70 ft
- Draught: 21ft 5 inches
- Propulsion: Steam DR geared Turbines
- Speed: 25 knots
- Capacity: 750
- Crew: 215

SS Ausonia, later known as the SS Ivory and Aegean Two while in service with her last owners, Golden Star Cruises, was a cruise liner belonging to Louis Cruise Lines operating in the Mediterranean. She operated mostly cruise service during her 52 years of life. She was the last vintage Italian ocean liner in service when she was retired from service in September 2008 and beached for dismantling in March 2010.

== 1956–1998 ==
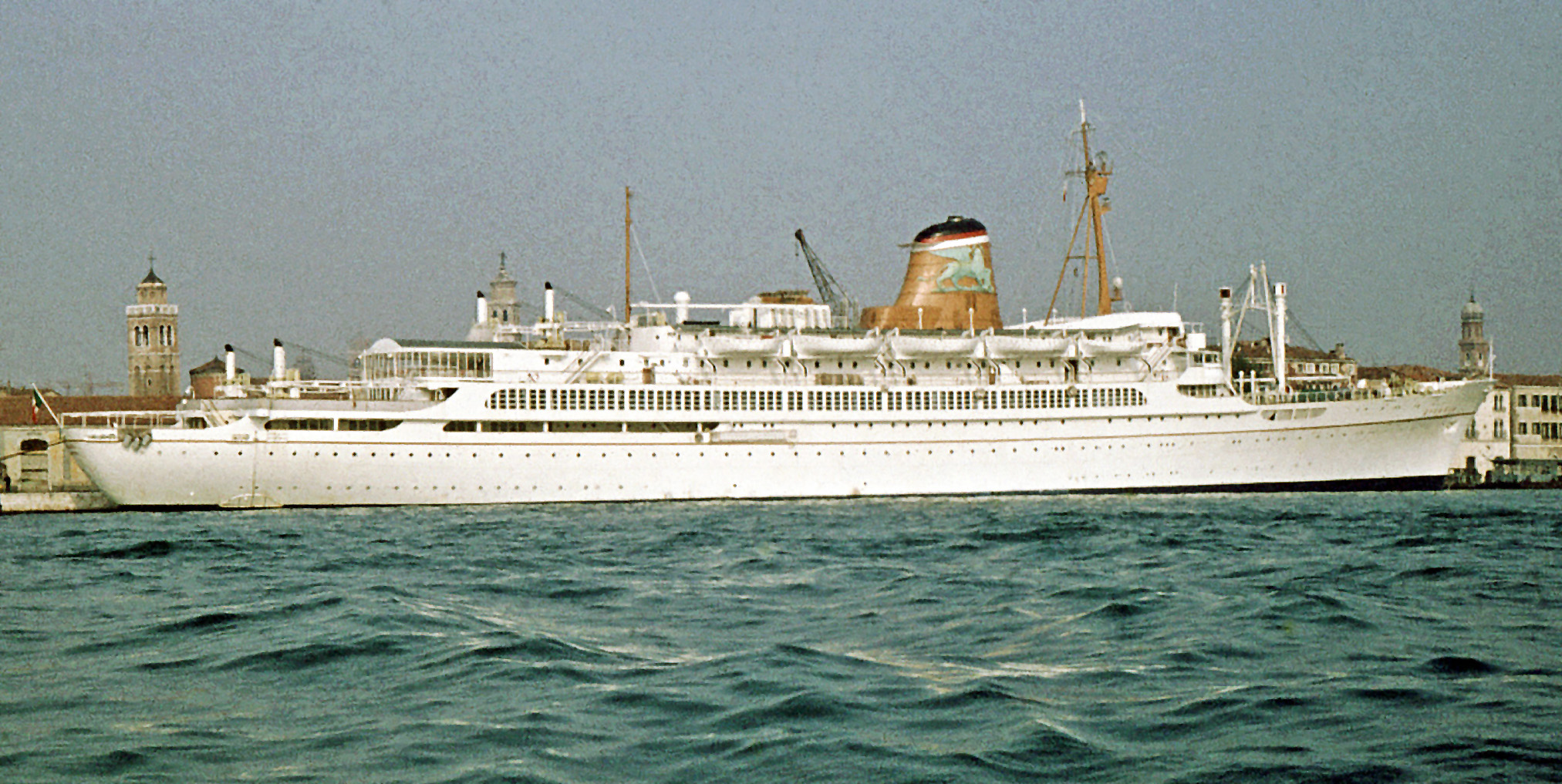
Ausonia in Venice, October 1972

A postcard of the Ausonia depicted in Louis Cruise Lines livery

She was commissioned by Adriatica Lines for its Trieste–Egypt–Lebanon service. She was launched by Cantieri Riuniti dell' Adriatico at Monfalcone on 5 August 1956, and delivered on 23 September 1957. She was rapidly fitted out and commenced service in October 1957. Ports of call were Trieste, Venice, Brindisi, Alexandria, Beirut, Piraeus and Bari. She remained in service with her original owners until 1978, when she underwent a major refit that increased her passenger capacity from 529 to 690. She remained in service with her new owners, Italia Crociere Internazionali, until 1998, when she was sold to the Cyprus-based Louis Cruise Lines.

A baby girl was born which was named after the ship "Ausonia' on January 5, 1959, at 07:30. Her parents Elias Sleiman Saikali and Harba (Naufal), later her name was registered as 'Azonia'.

Ausonia (Azonia) was delivered by Doctor Viviani Leonardo. Ausonia was baptized the same day, the godfather was Captain Gino Fabbro. Witness was Vianello Francesco.

The couple were immigrating from Lebanon to Canada. Her birth was registered at the Lebanese Consulat in Napoli on January 8, 1959.

== 1998–2010 ==
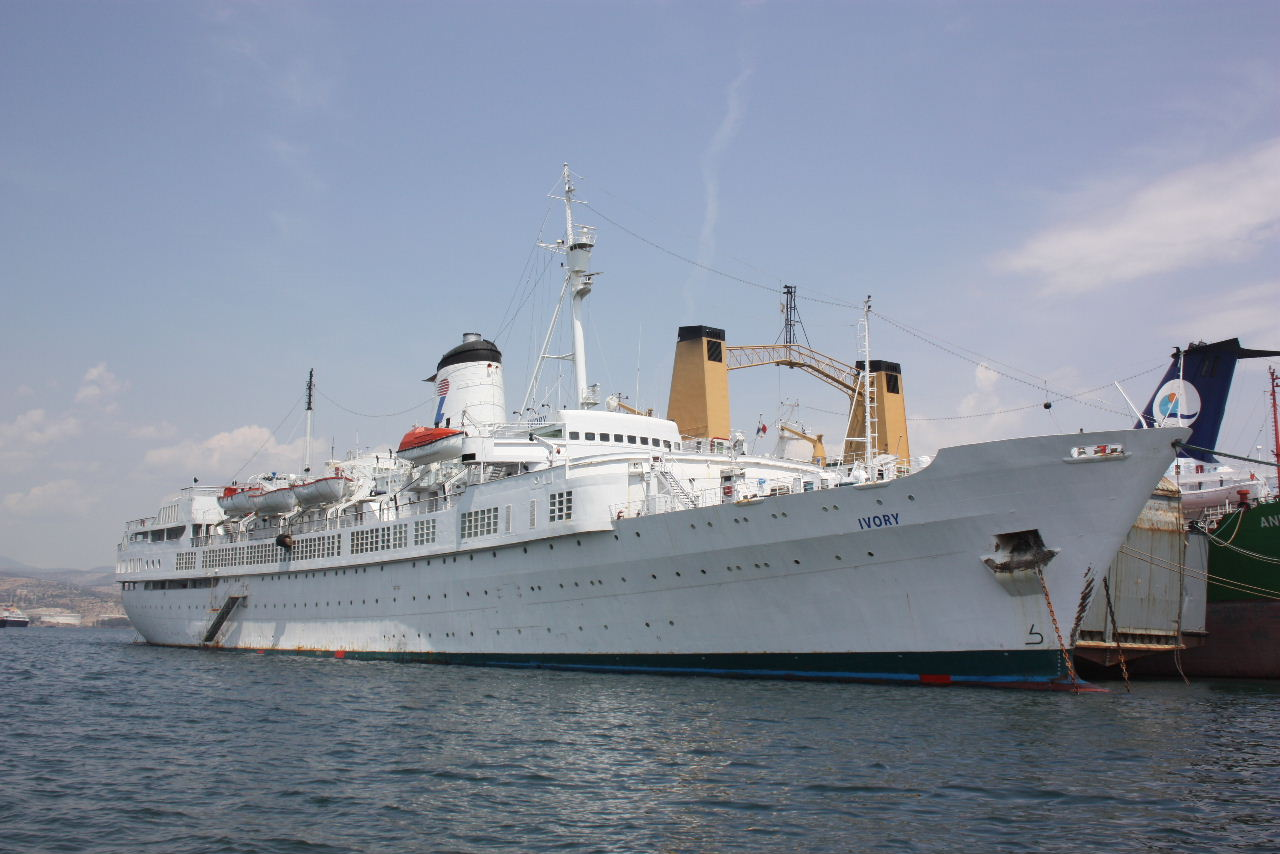
Ivory laid up in Eleusis, August 16, 2008

She never entered service with her original owners right away, as she was chartered to First Choice Holidays for about four years, before entering service for Louis. She was then in 2005 renamed Ivory by Louis and continued to operate under Louis Cruise Lines until the end of summer 2008 (sailing from Cyprus to Port Said in Egypt for 2 day excursion cruises). The Ivory was withdrawn from service in 2009 due to her not fulfilling the SOLAS 2010 regulations.

== Demise ==
She was beached for scrapping operations at Alang, India on March 3, 2010. She was renamed Winner 5 in preparation for scrapping. The stripping of her interiors has begun, and cutting is imminent. By May 20 scrapping had begun, and the tip of her bow was cut. Fellow ocean liner Maestro replaced her and was beached in her plot, 141.
