= MV Serenade =

Ship built in 1957

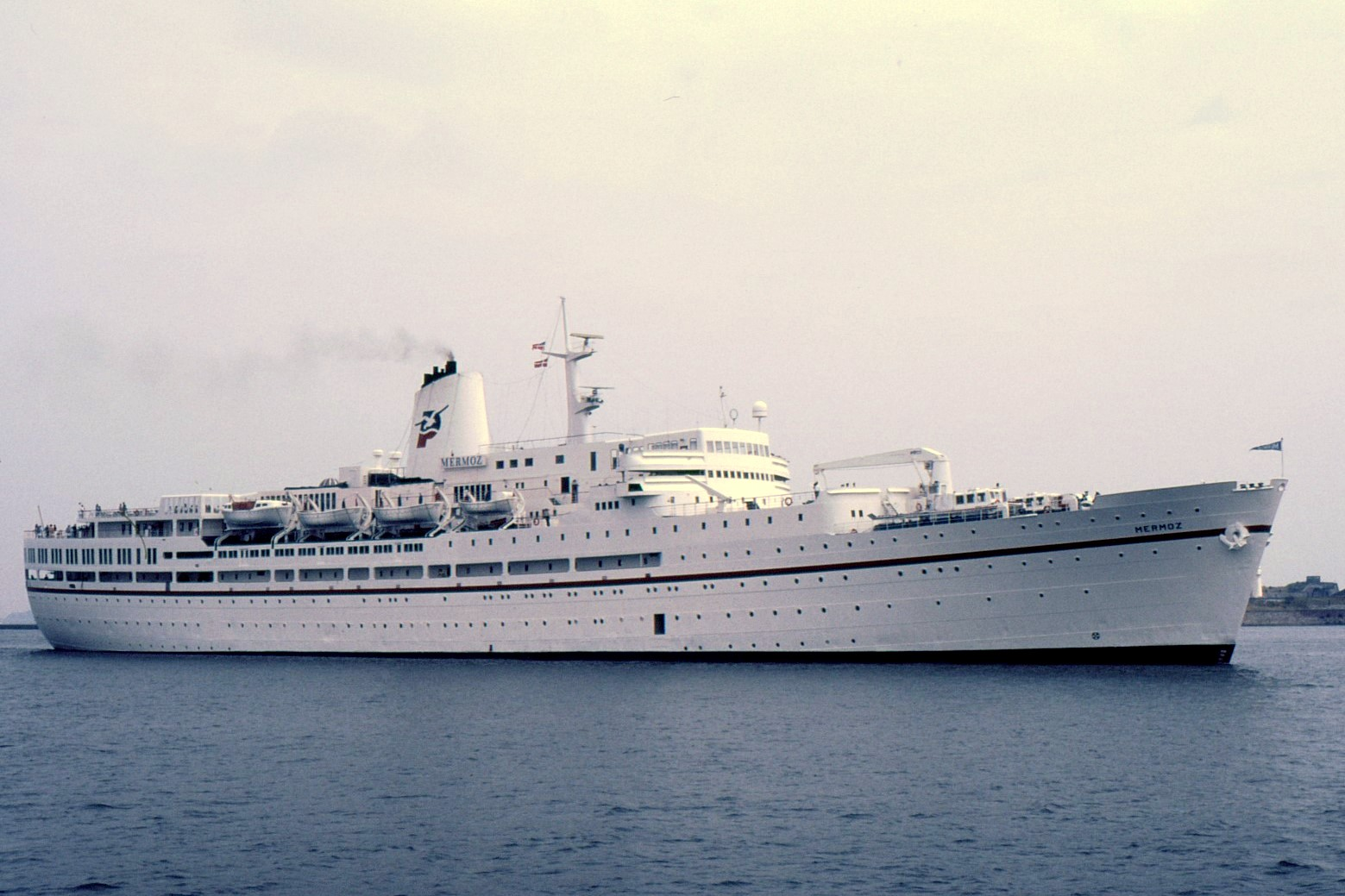
- The Mermoz at Copenhagen on July 21, 1986

History
- Name: 1958–1969: Jean Mermoz; 1970–1999: Mermoz; 1999–2008: Serenade; 2008: Serena
- Operator: 1958–1965: Compagnie de Navigation Fraissinet; 1965–1970: Nouvelle Cie des Paquebots; 1970–1993: Paquet Cruises; 1993–1999: Costa Cruises; 2000–2008: Louis Cruise Lines
- Port of registry: 1957–1985: Marseille, France; 1985–1999: Nassau, Bahamas; 1999–2000: Limassol, Cyprus; 2000–2008: Nassau, Bahamas; 2008: Batumi, Georgia
- Builder: Chantiers de l'Atlantique
- Launched: November 17, 1956
- Completed: May 1957
- In service: 1958
- Out of service: 2008
- Identification: Call sign 4LFE2; IMO number: 5171115
- Fate: Scrapped in Alang, India, 2008

General characteristics
- Tonnage: 12,460 GRT (1958); 13,804 GRT (1970); 14,173 GT (2000)
- Length: 527 ft (161 m)
- Propulsion: B&W diesel engines
- Speed: 18.5 knots (34.3 km/h; 21.3 mph)

MV Serenade was a French ocean liner and later cruise ship, operating until 2008 when she was sold for scrap.

== Ocean liner service ==
The Serenade was built for service on the Marseille to West Africa route as the Jean Mermoz, named after the famed aviator. She was originally designed to carry 854 passengers (144 first class, 140 second class, 110 third class, and 460 troops), as well as cargo. For eight uneventful years she went on the same voyage, departing France and calling at Casablanca, Dakar, Conakry, Monrovia, Abidjan, Tema, Lomé, Cotonou, Lagos, Douala, Libreville, Port Gentil, and Pointe Noire for her owners, Compagnie de Navigation Fraissinet et Cyprien Fabre. The popular ship was the last of the colonial-era French-owned classic liners to sail exclusively under the French flag. In 1965 she was transferred to Nouvelle Cie de Paquebots. As competition grew fierce with Greek and Italian shipping companies, who offered less expensive voyages, Jean Mermoz was sold to the Paquet Cruises, who converted her into a full-time cruise ship. As colonial-era route diminished in scale, she was thus converted into a full-time cruise ship by 1970 at Genoa, Italy.

== Cruise service ==
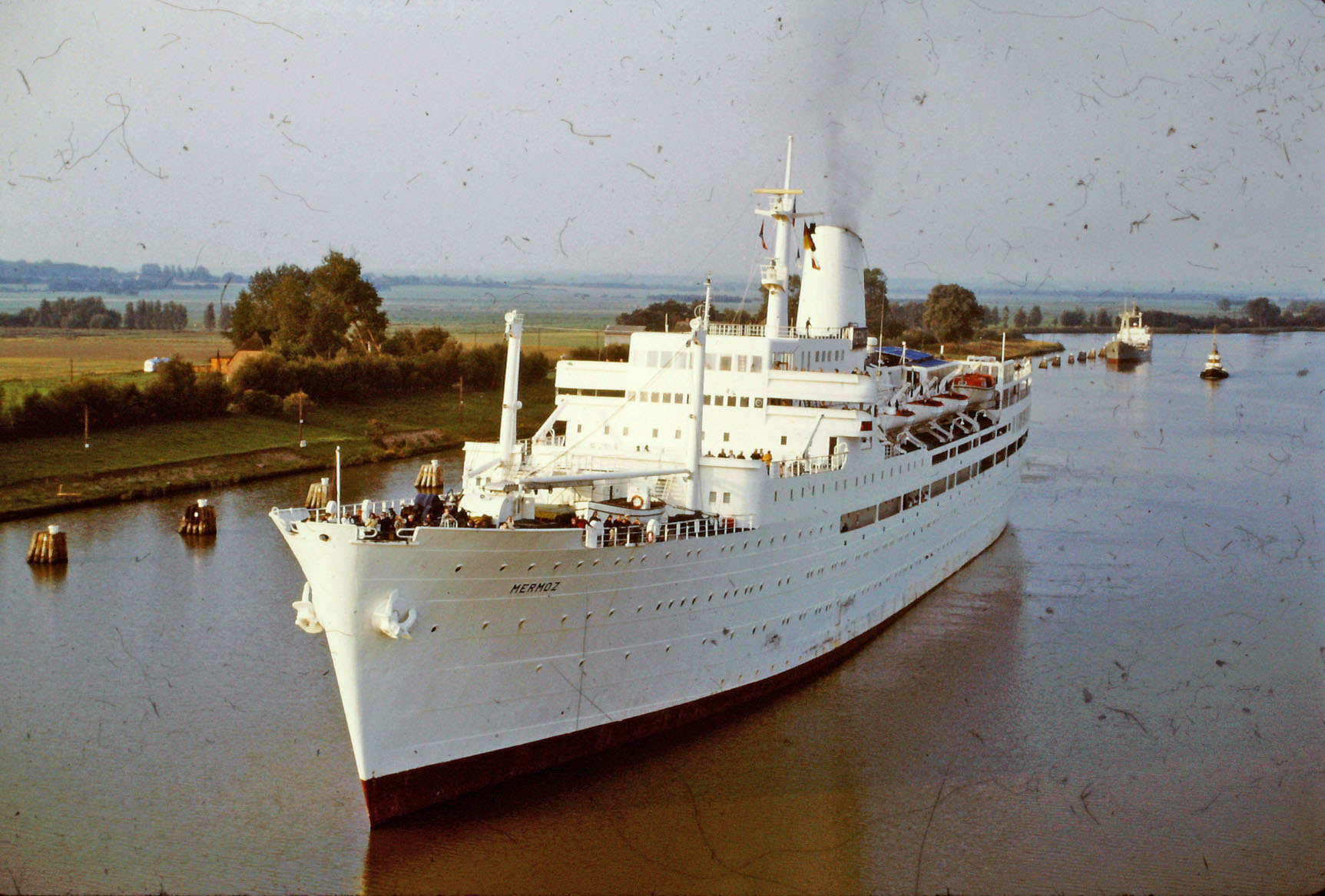
Mermoz at Kiel Canal in 1975

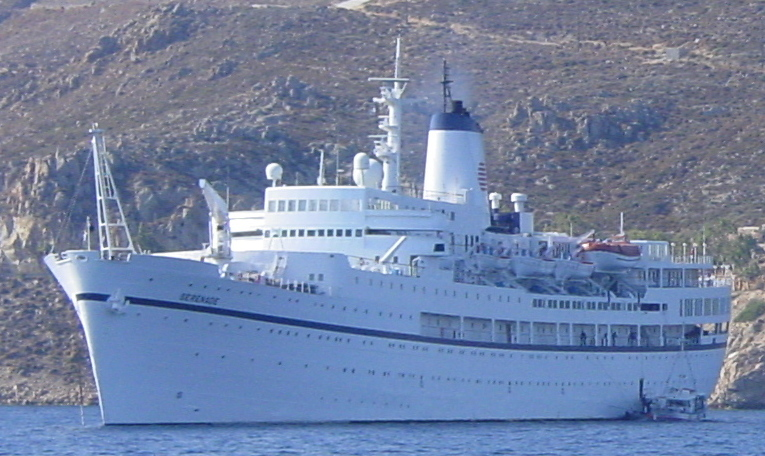
Serenade at Patmos in 2005

Jean Mermoz's appearance changed drastically after the 1969-1970 rebuilding at the T. Marriotti Shipyard, as her superstructure was expanded and her traditional looking round funnel was replaced with a streamlined cylinder like one. With the conversion her name was changed to Mermoz. Mermoz operated cruises along the South American coast, through the Galápagos Islands and around the Black Sea. In 1985 her first South Pacific cruise was delayed three days due to pay disputes with crew members. Then tugboat operators declared her "black" in protest against the French nuclear tests in the Pacific.

In 1993, Costa Cruises bought Paquet and all of its assets, but continued to operate Mermoz under the Paquet brand name on cruises targeted at the French market. In 1996 Carnival Cruise Line bought Costa. Carnival subsequently dissolved Paquet and laid up Mermoz. In 1999 Carnival sold Mermoz to the Cyprus based Louis Cruise Lines, who renamed her Serenade. Serenade operated two-night cruises, starting in Limassol and calling in Israel and Egypt. Due to the Israeli–Palestinian conflict she was switched to a two-night cruise from Malta to Italy. Serenade later served as a floating hotel for the 27th G8 summit in Genoa. Throughout the rest of her career with Louis she spent considerable amounts of time laid up at Eleusis Bay, because Louis operated the vessel only during the summer months. In 2003 she began an itinerary of short cruises from Cyprus to the Greek Islands and Egypt.

== Demise ==
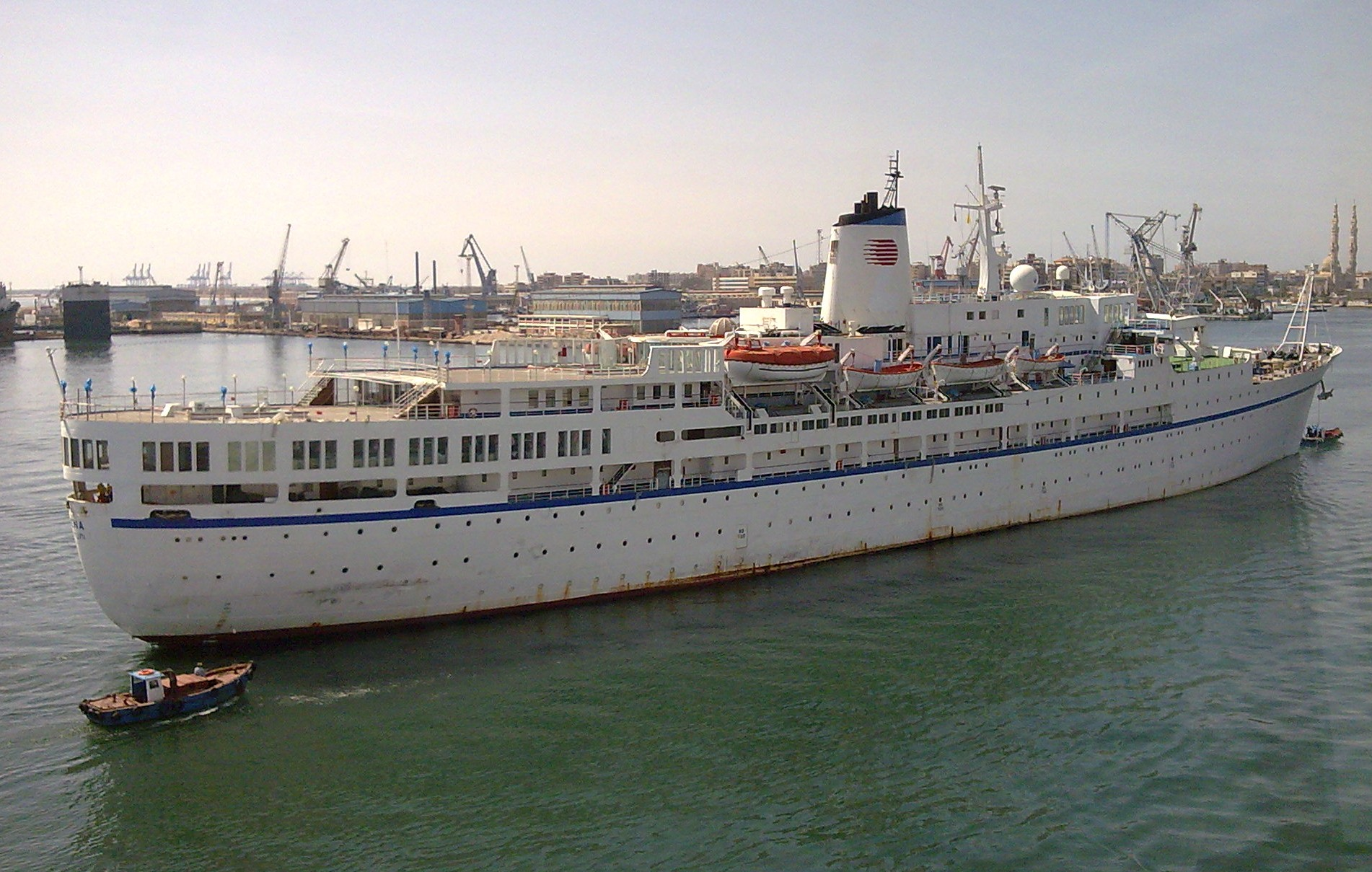
Serena in Port Said on May 23, 2008 during her last trip to the scrapyard of Alang.

In 2008 she was renamed Serena and sailed to scrapyards at Alang where she was beached and scrapped. Her departure from the cruising scene was noted around the world, with the popular travel magazine Cruise Travel also paying tribute the following year to the ship in their annual Directory Issue's Cruising's Classic Past.
