= MS Renaissance =

Cruise liner built in 1966

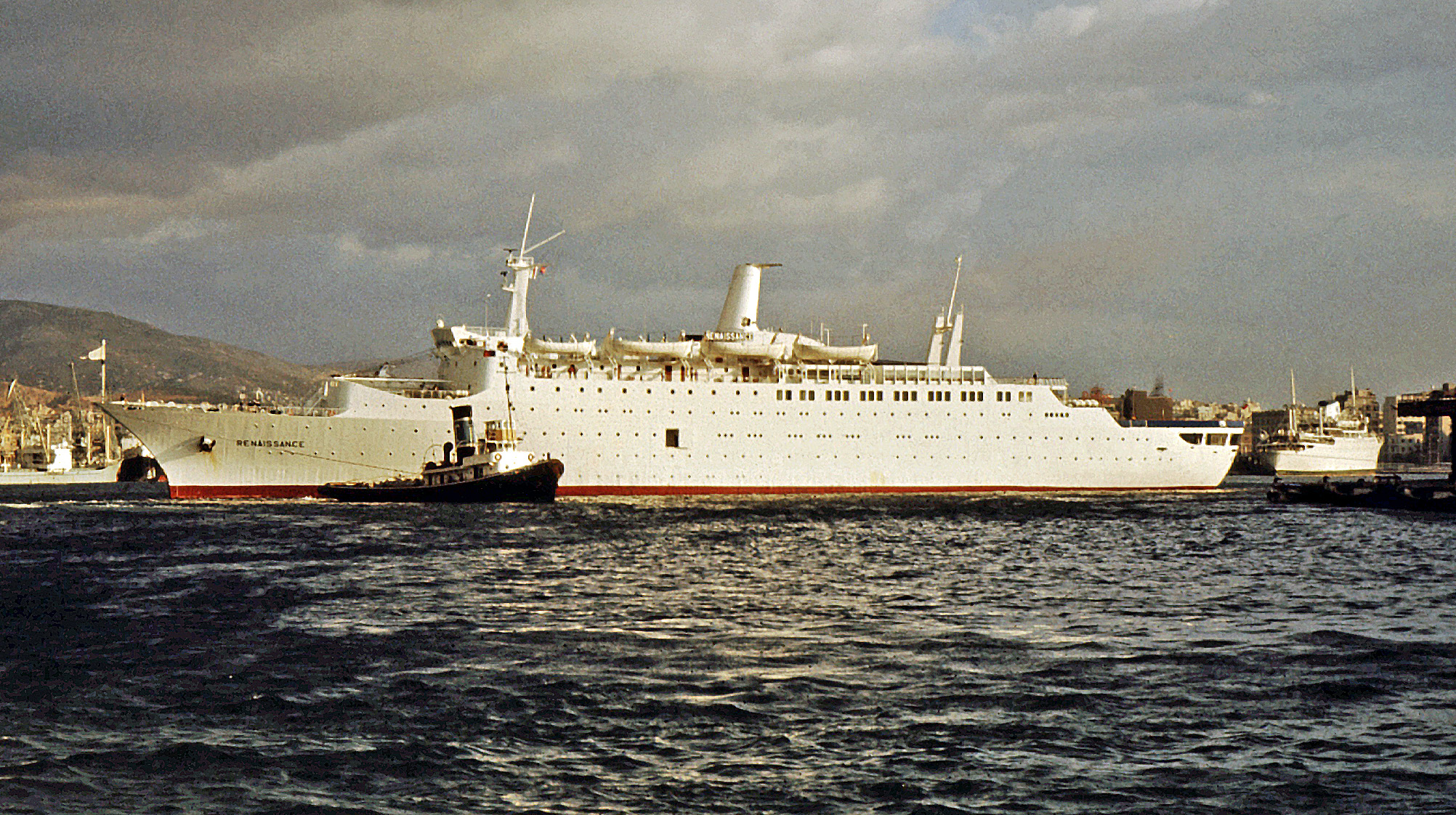
- Renaissance in Piraeus, 1972

History
- Name: 1966–1977: Renaissance; 1977: Homeric Renaissance; 1978–1995: World Renaissance; 1995–1998: Awani Dream; 1998–2004: World Renaissance; 2004–2006: Grand Victoria; 2007–2009: Blue Monarch; 2010: Maestro
- Operator: 1966–1977: Compagnie Francaise de Navigation; 1977–1978: Epirotiki Lines; 1978–1982: Costa Cruises; 1982–1983: Epirotiki Lines; 1983–1984: TFC Tours; 1984–1995: Epirotiki Lines; 1996–1998: Awani Cruises; 1998–2004: Royal Olympic Line; 2005–2006: Elysian Cruise Lines; 2006: Metropolis Tur; 2007–2009: Blue Monarch Shipping
- Builder: Chantiers de l’Atlantique
- Launched: 11 December 1965
- Completed: 1966
- In service: 1966
- Out of service: 2009
- Identification: IMO number: 6604834
- Nickname(s): The White Dolphin
- Fate: Scrapped, 2010

General characteristics
- Tonnage: 12,000 tons
- Length: 492 feet
- Propulsion: diesel engines, two propellers
- Speed: 16 knots
- Capacity: 474
- Crew: 230

MS Renaissance was a 1966 built cruise liner. She was built by Chantiers de l'Atlantique for Compagnie Francaise de Navigation, a subsidiary of Paquet Cruises. She operated for various owners until she was sold to be scrapped at Alang, India in 2010.

== Paquet Line ==
She entered service as a dual purpose vessel, ferrying passengers from Marseille, France to Haifa, Israel, and also operating Eastern Mediterranean cruises. She sailed on these itineraries successfully for 4 years. In 1970, due to fierce competition from the commercial jet industry, Paquet unestablished Compagnie Francaise de Navigation, and founded the new subsidiary Nouvelle Compagnie de Paquebots. For the new company she began operating a transatlantic route from Marseille to New York City. After 11 years of service with her original owners she was sold to Epirotiki Line.

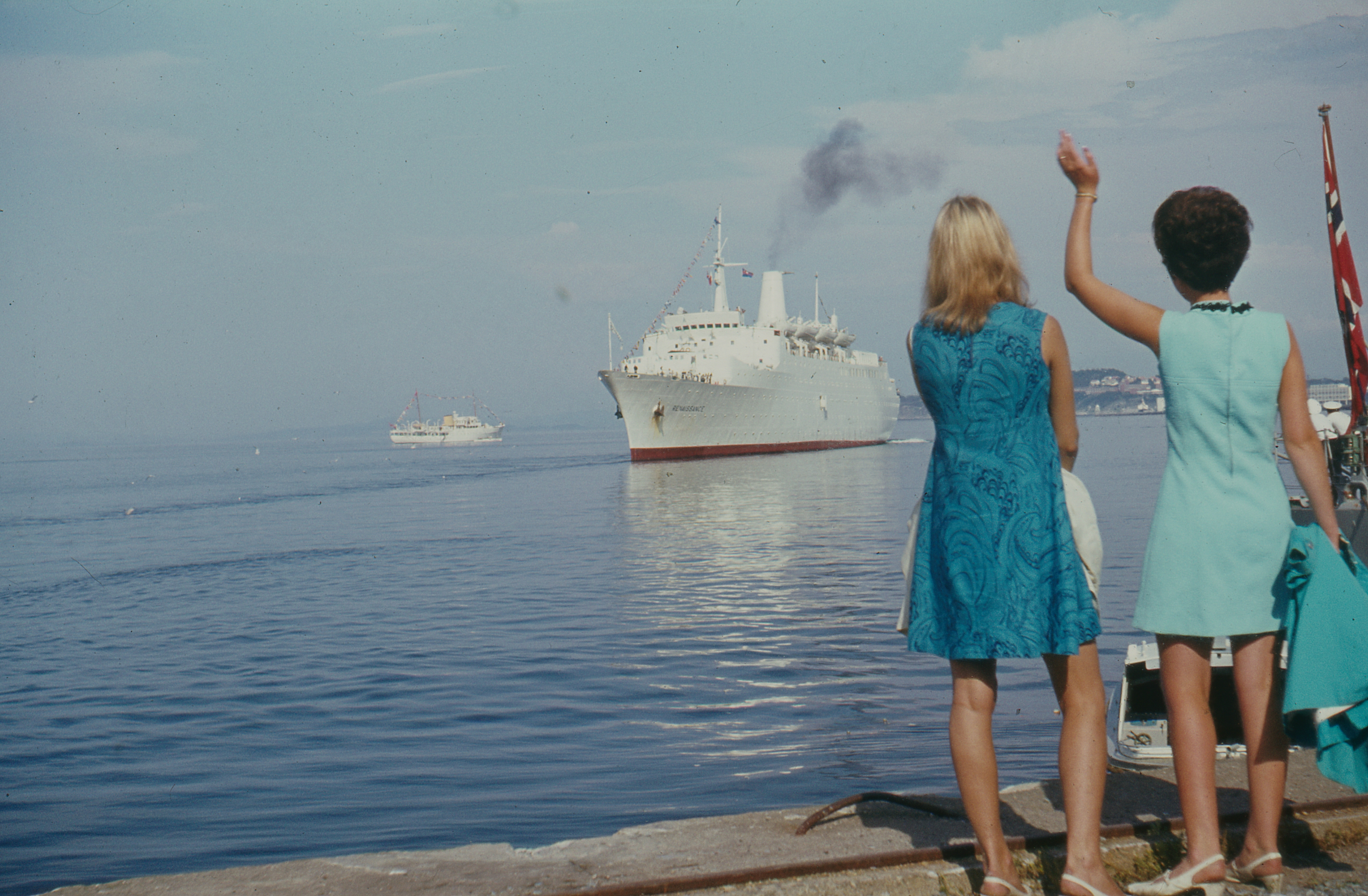
Renaissance in 1969

== Cruise service ==
=== Epirotiki Line ===
During a 1977-78 refit several new cabins were added. She was renamed Homeric Renaissance and upon entering service became Epirotiki's flagship. However very soon after this she was chartered to Costa Cruises, and operated for them as World Renaissance until 1982. After the charter she was given back to Epirotiki. She continued service with them until 1983, when World Renaissance was chartered yet again, this time to TFC Tours, with her completing a single voyage for them. In 1985 Epirotiki began to World Renaissance for Caribbean and Amazon river cruises. She continued this service for 10 uneventful years until 1995, when she was purchased by Awani Cruises.

=== Awani Cruises ===
A 1995-96 refit saw her renamed Awani Dream. However she barely saw a year and a half of service due to the collapse of Awani Cruises. She was sold to the reformed and renamed Epirotiki company Royal Olympic Cruise Line.

=== Royal Olympic Cruise Line ===
In 1998 she entered service with Royal Olympic, a renamed, merged version of her former owners Epirokiti. She was again renamed World Renaissance, operating 3 and 4 night Aegean cruises out of Piraeus, Greece. All went well until 2001, when the September 11th terrorist attacks caused a slump in the tourist and cruise industries. Royal Olympic managed to survive until the fall of 2004, when they filed for bankruptcy due to the high operational costs of operating the old ships in their fleet and fierce competition from other cruise lines. After being laid up for several months World Renaissance was sold for over $3 million to Pelorus Maritime Inc.

== Later years ==
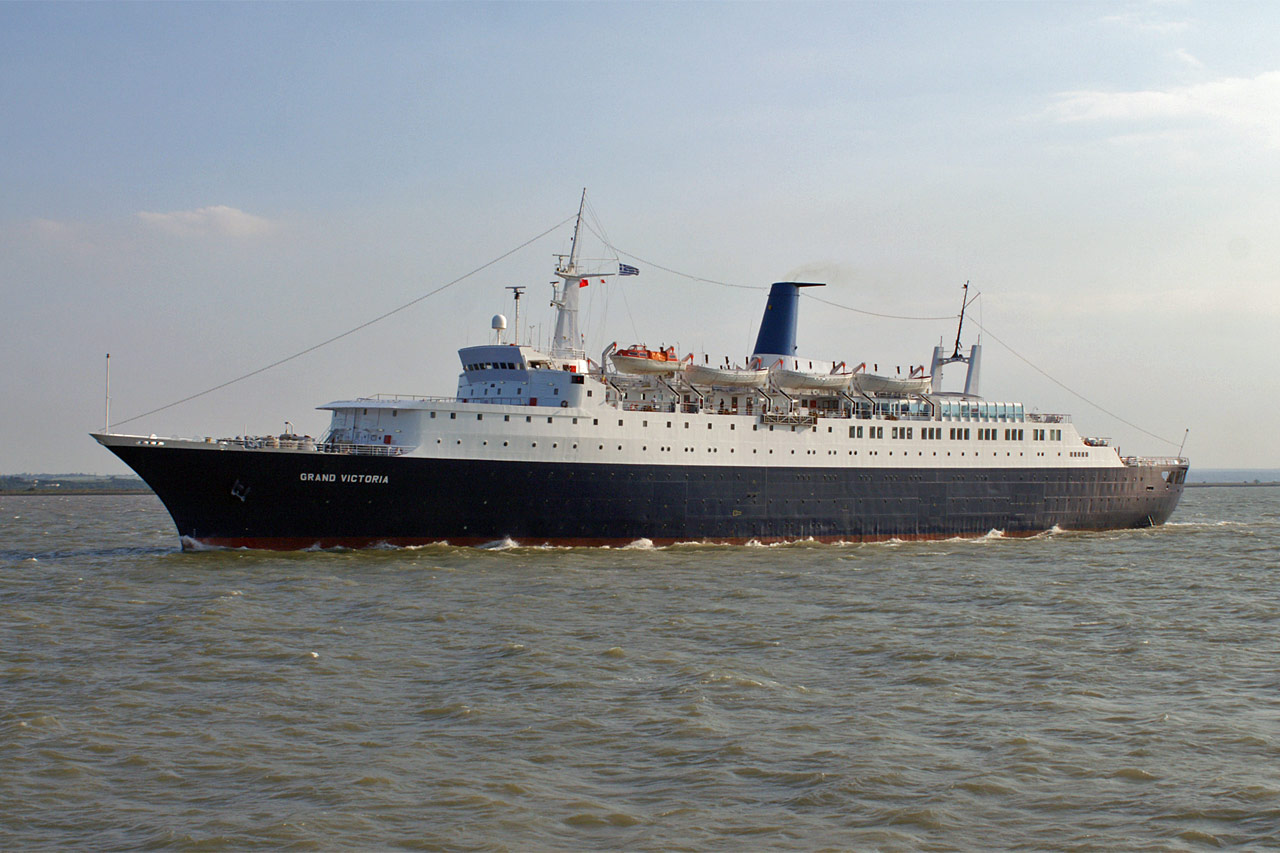
Grand Victoria in June 2006

She was renamed Grand Victoria after Pelorus placed her under the management of Elysian Cruise Lines. She was chartered by them to Metropolis Tur until the end of 2006. In 2007 she was chartered to Blue Monarch Shipping Inc and renamed Blue Monarch. Under their ownership she carried out 3, 4 and 7 night cruises to Greek islands. Blue Monarch Shipping attempted to purchase her in 2008, but could not come up with the $8 million required. Her charter continued until she ended service in early 2009, when it was realized that she did not meet SOLAS 2010 standards.

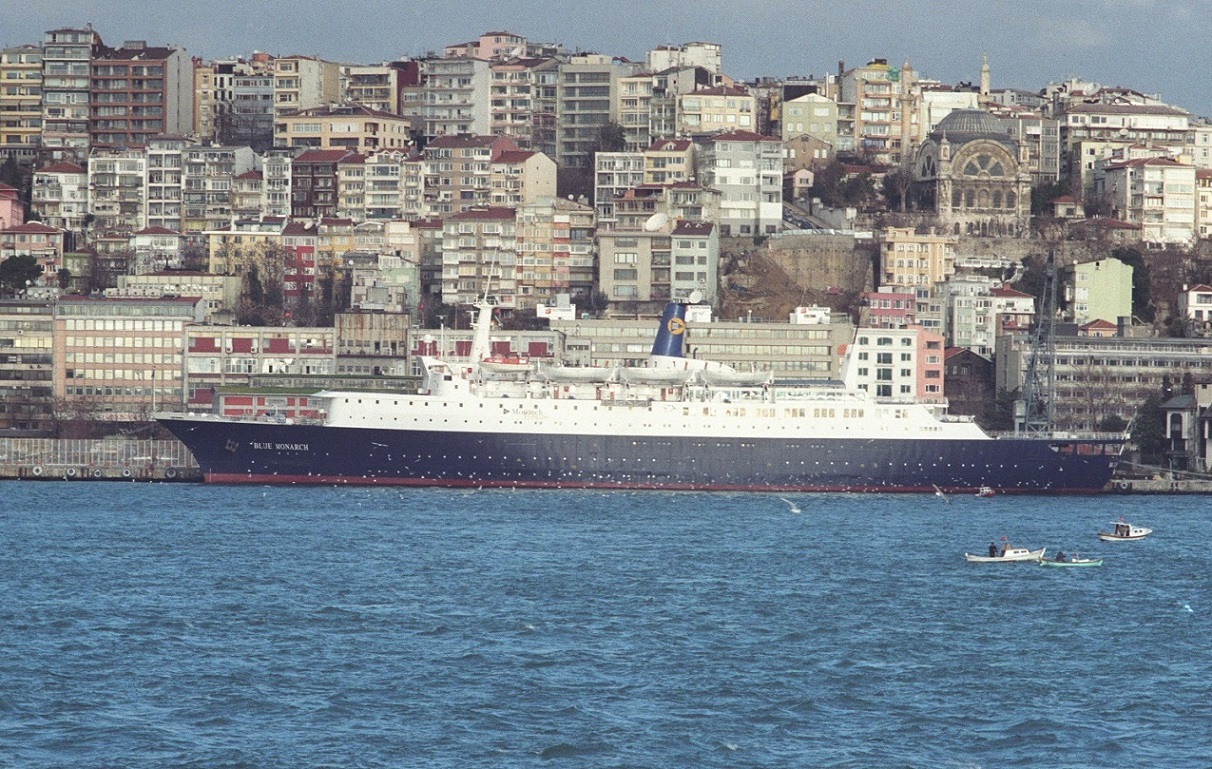
Blue Monarch moored in Istanbul, 25 January 2008

=== Sale for scrap and attempts to be sold ===
Blue Monarch was promptly laid up. One company attempted to buy her for use as a hotel ship for the 2010 Winter Olympics, but this plan fell through. In February 2010 Blue Monarch was sold for $1.8 million to Indian scrap merchants. She was renamed Maestro for her voyage to Alang. When scrap merchants attempted to sell her for further use she was anchored off of Port Said. No one was interested, so Maestro continued on to reach her final destination

Although the attempt to sell her in Port Said had failed, Maestro was next laid up in Bombay, for scrappers were once again attempting to sell her, as this would be more profitable due to the current price of steel. She was purchased by Dubai-based company ARGO Systems for further possible service though this was very unlikely considering that she did not comply with SOLAS 2010 mechanically. ARGO Systems has been known to buy and transport ships to recycling yards in India, China, and Bangladesh. They have transported many liners to scrapyards including the Eugenio C. ARGO expressed interest in using her as an accommodation ship.

=== Demise ===
Finally it was confirmed that Maestro would be towed from her anchorage off of Bombay to Alang, India to be scrapped on August 10, 2010. She was beached in Plot 141, the same place where Italian ocean liner Winner 5 was scrapped. A photo dated August 30, 2010 shows Maestro beached behind the remains of Winner 5 and beside those of Mont, the largest ship ever constructed. She was cleared for breaking and wedged closer ashore within a few weeks. Maestro was half demolished by November 13, 2010. Her scrapping was completed in early 2011.
