= List of cruise ships =

This is a list of cruise ships, both those in service and those that have ceased to operate. Ocean liners are included on this list only if they also functioned as cruise ships. (See: list of ocean liners.)

As some cruise ships have operated under multiple names, all names will be listed in the Status section, along with the history of the vessel, under the vessel's current or most recent name. If a vessel is not currently operating as a cruise ship, only the most recent operation will be listed here. Likewise, if a vessel fulfilled another role before becoming a cruise ship, the first entry for the vessel will occur when the vessel began its career as a cruise ship.

Name	Operator	Year built	Tonnage	Status	Image
Achille Lauro	StarLauro Cruises	1947	23,629	Sunk. Built between 1939 and 1947 as the Willem Ruys, a passenger liner for Rotterdamsche Lloyd. Began service as the Achille Lauro for StarLauro Cruises since 1965. She is most remembered for her 1985 hijacking. In 1994, the ship caught fire and sank in the Indian Ocean off Somalia.	Achille Lauro
Adriana	Adriana Shipping	1972	4,490	Scrapped in 2019. Began operation in 1972 as the Aquarius for Hellenic Mediterranean Lines, Adriana (1987–2008), Adriana III (2008–2010).	Adriana in Bridgetown
Adora Mediterranea	Adora Cruises	2003	86,000	Operating, Formerly: Costa Mediterranea	
Adventure of the Seas	Royal Caribbean International	2001	137,276	Operating	Adventure of the Seas approaches Barbados
Aegean Majesty	Seajets	1996	55,451	Laid up; formerly Veendam	Veendam sailing outside Gloucester
Aegean Odyssey	Voyages to Antiquity	1973	11,563	Operating. Formerly the ferry Narcis for Zim Lines, the Aegean Dolphin in 1986 for Dolphin Hellas, and the Aegean I in 1996, while chartered to Renaissance Cruises. Since 2009, the Aegean Odyssey.	Aegean Odyssey at Split
Aegean Paradise	New Century Cruise Line	1990	23,287	Operating. Formerly, Orient Venus, Cruise One, Delphin Voyager, Hainan Empress, Happy Dolphin.	Aegean Paradise at Rhodes
AIDAbella	AIDA Cruises	2008	69,203	Operating	AIDAbella in Kiel
AIDAblu	AIDA Cruises	2010	71,304	Operating	AIDAblu in Corfu
AIDAcosma	AIDA Cruises	2022	183,858	Operating	Aida Cosma at Meyer Werft
AIDAdiva	AIDA Cruises	2007	69,203	Operating	AIDAdiva in Warnemünde
AIDAluna	AIDA Cruises	2009	69,203	Operating	AIDAluna in Road Town
AIDAmar	AIDA Cruises	2012	71,300	Operating	AIDAmar in Hamburg
AIDAnova	AIDA Cruises	2018	183,858	Operating	AIDAnova in Meyer Werft
AIDAperla	AIDA Cruises	2017	125,572	Operating	AIDAperla in Le Havre
AIDAprima	AIDA Cruises	2016	125,572	Operating	AIDAprima in Rotterdam
AIDAsol	AIDA Cruises	2011	71,304	Operating	AIDAsol in Trondheim
AIDAstella	AIDA Cruises	2013	71,304	Operating	AIDAstella in Hamburg
Albatros	Phoenix Reisen	1973	20,018	Originally Royal Viking Sea for Royal Viking Line. Scrapped in 2021 in Alang India	Albatros in 2009
Allure of the Seas	Royal Caribbean International	2010	225,282	Operating	Allure of the Seas in Falmouth
Amadea	Phoenix Reisen	1991	28,856	Operating. Originally the Asuka for Nippon Yusen Kaisha, sold in 2006 to Amadea Shipping Co., and now under charter to Phoenix Reisen.	Amadea at Split
Ambience	Ambassador Cruise line	2007	69,845	Operating. Formerly: Regal Princess, Pacific Dawn, Satoshi	Ambience at Tallinn
Ambition	Ambassador Cruise Line	1999	48,200	Operating. Entered service as Mistral for Festival Cruises (1999–2003), formerly Grand Mistral for Ibero Cruises (2003–2013), Costa neoRiviera for Costa Cruises (2013–2019), and AIDAmira for AIDA Cruises (2019–2022)	MS Ambition at Casablanca in 2023
Amera	Phoenix Reisen	1988	38,000	Operating. Formerly: Prinsendam, Seabourn Sun, built as Royal Viking Sun.	
America	United States Line / Chandris Line / Venture Cruise Lines	1939	33,961	Wrecked in 1994. Later named, USS West Point, Australis, reverted to America in 1978, Italis, Noga, Alferdoss, American Star.	
American Eagle	American Cruise Lines	2000		Defunct as a cruise ship. Permanently moored at Chesapeake Shipbuilding as housing for contractors.	American Eagle in Boston
American Glory	American Cruise Lines	2002		Sunk as an artificial reef	American Glory in Chelsea Piers
Amerikanis	Chandris Line / Costa Cruises	1952	17,041	Scrapped. Originally, the Kenya Castle for Union-Castle Line. Sold to Chandris Line in 1967, and renamed the Amerikanis, leased to Costa Cruises from 1980 to 1984. Laid up in 1996 and scrapped in 2001.	Amerikanis in Bermuda, 1987
Andes	Royal Mail Lines	1939	27,000	Scrapped. Built as liner for South American trade. Troopship 1939–1945, then reverted to liner, becoming a cruise ship in 1959 and scrapped in 1971.	
Anthem of the Seas	Royal Caribbean International	2015	168,666	Operating	Anthem of the Seas in Hamburg
Aquarama	Michigan-Ohio Navigation Company	1945	12,773	Former C-4 breakbulk carrier Marine Star, turned into a great lakes cruise ship before being retired in 1995 and renamed Marine Star. Towed to Aliağa for scrapping in 2007.	Aquarama docked in Buffalo.
Aranui 3	Aranui Cruises	2003	3,800	Operated as a cruise line to the Marquesas Islands from Tahiti in addition to providing freight services to the Marquesas. Aranui 3 began cruising in 2003 and was replaced by Aranui 5 in early 2016.	Aranui 3 in the Marquesas, 2009
Aranui 5	Aranui Cruises	2015	7,500	Operating	
Arcadia	P&O Cruises	2004	86,799	Operating	Arcadia in Tallinn
Arethusa	Grand Circle Dubrovnik Doo	2008	1,206	Operating	
Arosa Kulm	Arosa Line	1919	8,929	Scrapped. Built in 1919 by American International Shipbuilding Corp., Hog Island, Pennsylvania. Sold in 1924 to American Merchant Lines, in 1934 transferred to United States Lines. In 1940 sold to Société Maritime Anversoise, Belgium and renamed Ville d’Anvers, then in 1945 returned to USL, then in 1946 it was transferred to Isbrandtsen Line renamed City of Athens, then in 1947 sold to Incres Line renamed Protea, then in 1952 it was sold to Arosa Line renamed Arosa Kulm, then in 1959 it was scrapped at Bruges.	
Arosa Star	Arosa Line	1931	9,070	Grounded. Originally a liner, the Borinquen (1931), renamed Puerto Rico in 1949, Arosa Star in 1954, Bahama Star in 1959, La Jenelle in 1969, grounded 13 April 1970 in California.	
Arosa Sun	Arosa Line	1929		Scrapped. Originally a liner, the Félix Roussel (1929), renamed Arosa Sun in 1955. Sold in 1960 and used as a hotel ship. Scrapped in 1974.	
Artania	Phoenix Reisen	1984	44,348	Operating. Originally, the Royal Princess, transferred as Artemis in 2005, sold in 2009, and renamed in 2011 as Artania.	Artania in Port of Tallinn, 2012
Arvia	P&O Cruises	2022	185,581	Joint-largest cruise ship ever built for P&O Cruises and the UK market. Originally planned for the first half of 2022, but delayed to December 2022 as a result of the COVID-19 pandemic	Arvia in Marseille
Assedo	Kaalbye Shipping International	1968	19,361	Scrapped. Originally the Shota Rustaveli, sold in 2000 as the Assedo. Scrapped in 2003.	Assedo
Astor	Cruise & Maritime Voyages	1987	20,606	Scrapped. Originally, the Astor, renamed Feodor Dostojevskiy in 1998, returned to Astor in 1995 Sold for scrap in 2020	Astor at Fremantle, 2016
Astoria	Brock Pierce	1948-2025	12,165	Awaiting to be scrapped. Ex- Azores, Athena, Völkerfreundschaft, Volker, Fridtjof Nansen, Italia I, Italia Prima, Valtur Prima, Caribe, built as Stockholm.	Astoria in the Thames Estuary, 2017
Astoria Grande	Aquilon Shipping Co	1996	38,531	Operating. Formerly AIDA, AIDAcara	
Asuka II	Nippon Yusen Kaisha	1990	50,142	Operating. Formerly Crystal Harmony.	Asuka II moored at Kobe
Atlantic Star	Pullmantur Cruises	1984	46,000	Scrapped under name Antic in 2013 at Aliağa, Turkey. Ex-Pacific Sky, Sky Princess, Sky Wonder, built as Fairsky.	
Aurora	P&O Cruises	2000	76,000	Operating	Aurora at Santorini basin
Ausonia	Louis Cruise Lines	1956	11,879	Beached for scrapping in March 2010	Ausonia in Genoa, 1989
Azamara Journey	Azamara	2007	30,277	Operating. Formerly R six for Renaissance Cruises until 2000, Blue Dream for Pullmantur Cruises until 2005.	Azamara Journey at Fremantle, 2018
Azamara Pursuit	Azamara	2001	30,277	Operating. Began operation in 2001 as the R Eight for Renaissance Cruises, in 2003 as the Minerva II for Swan Hellenic, in 2007 as the Royal Princess for Princess Cruises, and in 2011 as the Adonia. Transferred to fathom in 2016. Returned to P&O in 2018, before being sold to Azamara as the Azamara Pursuit.	Azamara Pursuit n the Greek Islands
Azamara Quest	Azamara	2007	30,277	Operating. Formerly R seven for Renaissance Cruises until 2000, Blue Moon for Pullmantur Cruises until 2005.	Azamara Quest at Split
Azura	P&O Cruises	2010	116,000	Operating	Azura in Tortola
Bahamas Celebration	Celebration Cruise Line	1981	35,483	Scrapped. Built as passenger/Ro-Ro ship (vehicles). Formerly, the MS Prinsesse Ragnhild (1981–2008) sold and renamed in 2008, irreparably damaged in a grounding incident in 2014, sold for scrap in 2015.	
Balmoral	Fred. Olsen Cruise Lines	2007	43,537	Operating. Formerly: Norwegian Crown, Crown Odyssey.	Balmoral in Antwerp
Barcelona	Companhia Colonial de Navegacao	1961	23,306	Operated as Infante Dom Henrique until 1975, then operated as a floating hotel until 1988, sold and brought back as a cruise ship under the name Vasco da Gama (1988–91), sold and renamed SeaWind Crown (1991–2002), laid up in 2002, sold and renamed Barcelona, sent to the breakers in India in 2004	
Bella Fortuna	Celestyal Cruises	1982	37,773	Scrapped in 2025. Originally, the Song of America, formerly: Sunbird, Thomson Destiny, Louis Olympia, Celestyal Olympia	
Belofin I	AG Belofin Investments of Liechtenstein	1932	18,017	Formerly: the SS Monterey (1932–1953), the SS Matsonia (1954–63), and the SS Lurline (1963–1970), SS Britanis (1970–1998) chartered to the US Government as an accommodation ship (1994), laid up in (1996), sold and renamed Belofin I (1998), sold for scrap and sank off the Cape of Good Hope while en route to the breakers in 2000.	
Bianca C.	Costa Cruises	1944	18,427	Sank in 1961.	
The Big Red Boat	Premier Cruises	1961	32,000	Repossessed by creditors in 2000. Formerly: SS Big Red Boat III, SS IslandBreeze, SS Festivale, SS S.A. Vaal, RMS S.A. Vaal, RMS Transvaal Castle. Sold for scrap in 2003.	
Birka Gotland	Birka Line	2004	34,924	Operating, formerly: MS Birka Paradise, and MS Birka Stockholm.	Birka Stockholm in Mariehamn
Black Watch	Fred. Olsen Cruise Lines	1971	28,613	Scrapped 2022 in Alang. Formerly: Star Odyssey, Westward, Royal Viking Star.	
Blue Dream Melody		2002	42,289	Originally, the AIDAvita, formerly: Avitak; sold to an unknown owner	
Bolette	Fred. Olsen Cruise Lines	2000	61,000	Operating. Formerly Amsterdam	
Bore	Steamship Company Bore	1960	4,295	Hotel and museum ship in Turku Finland. Formerly: Bore, Borea, Kristina Regina, changed back to Bore.	Bore in Turku, 2010
MS Borealis	Fred. Olsen Cruise Lines	1997	61,849	Operating. Formerly: Rotterdam	
Boudicca	Fred. Olsen Cruise Lines	1973	28,388	Operating. Formerly: Grand Latino, Superstar Capricorn, Hyundai Keumgang, Golden Princess, Sunward, Birka Queen, Royal Viking Sky. Scrapped 2021 Aliaga,	
Brahe	Saimaan Matkaverkko Ltd	2010	1,105	Operating. Formerly: MS Kristina Brahe, USS PCE 830, HMS Kilchrenan, Sunnhordland.	
Bremen	Hapag-Lloyd Cruises	1993	6,753	Operating	
Brilliance of the Seas	Royal Caribbean International	2002	90,090	Operating	
Britannia	P&O Cruises	2015	143,730	Operating	
Calypso	Louis Cruise Lines	1967	11,162	Scrapped in 2013. Originally, the Canguro Verde, formerly 1981–1989: Durr, 1989–1990: Ionian Harmony, 1990–1993: Sun Fiesta, 1993–1994: Regent Jewel, 1994–2007: Calypso, 2007–2013: The Calypso	
Canberra	P&O	1961	49,073	Scrapped in 1997	
Caribbean Princess	Princess Cruises	2004	112,894	Operating	Caribbean Princess docked in Cobh, 2017
Carnival Adventure	Carnival Cruise Line	2001	108,865	Operating, formerly Golden Princess, and Pacific Adventure	
Carnival Breeze	Carnival Cruise Line	2012	130,000	Operating	
Carnival Celebration	Carnival Cruise Line	2022	183,521	Delivery 2023, LNG powered	Carnival Celebration in Funchal
Carnival Conquest	Carnival Cruise Line	2002	110,000	Operating	
Carnival Dream	Carnival Cruise Line	2009	130,000	Operating	
Carnival Ecstasy	Carnival Cruise Line	1991	70,367	Originally, the Ecstasy scrapped 2022, Aliaga	
Carnival Elation	Carnival Cruise Line	1998	71,909	Operating. Originally, the Elation	
Carnival Encounter	Carnival Cruise Line	2002	108,977	Operating, formerly Star Princess, and Pacific Encounter	
Carnival Fantasy	Carnival Cruise Line	1990	70,367	Originally, the Fantasy, scrapped in 2020	
Carnival Fascination	Carnival Cruise Line	1994	70,367	Originally, the Fascination. scrapped in 2022 as the Century Harmony in Gadani	
Carnival Firenze	Carnival Cruise Line	2021	135,156	Operating	
Carnival Freedom	Carnival Cruise Line	2007	110,000	Operating	Carnival Freedom in Port Canaveral
Carnival Glory	Carnival Cruise Line	2003	110,000	Operating	
Carnival Horizon	Carnival Cruise Line	2018	133,596	Operating	
Carnival Imagination	Carnival Cruise Line	1995	70,367	Originally, the Imagination Scrapped in 2020, Aliaga	
Carnival Inspiration	Carnival Cruise Line	1996	70,367	Originally, the Inspiration Scrapped in 2020, Aliaga.	
Carnival Jubilee	Carnival Cruise Line	1986	47,262	Also sailed as P&O Australia Pacific Sun and HNA Cruises Henna. Scrapped in 2017, Aliaga	
Carnival Jubilee	Carnival Cruise Line	2023	183,521	Delivery 2023, LNG powered	Carnival Jubilee at Cozumel
Carnival Legend	Carnival Cruise Line	2002	88,500	Operating	
Carnival Liberty	Carnival Cruise Line	2005	110,000	Operating.	
Carnival Luminosa	Carnival Cruise Line	2009	92,720	Operating. Transferred from Costa to Carnival in 2022	Carnival Luminosa in Brisbane
Carnival Magic	Carnival Cruise Line	2011	130,000	Operating.	Carnival Magic in Port Canaveral, 2023
Carnival Miracle	Carnival Cruise Line	2004	88,500	Operating.	Carnival Miracle in Puerto Vallarta, 2017
Carnival Panorama	Carnival Cruise Line	2019	133,868	Operating.	Carnival Panorama docked in Puerto Vallarta, 2020
Carnival Paradise	Carnival Cruise Line	1998	71,925	Operating. Originally, the Paradise	Carnival Paradise in Fall of 2021
Carnival Pride	Carnival Cruise Line	2002	88,500	Operating.	Carnival Pride leaving Kiel, 2023
Carnival Radiance	Carnival Cruise Line	2000	101,509	Operating. Originally, the Carnival Victory (renamed after refit).	Carnival Radiance docked in Ensenada, 2023
Carnival Sensation	Carnival Cruise Line	1993	70,367	Scrapped in Aliaga 2022 Originally, the Sensation	Carnival Sensation in 2008
Carnival Spirit	Carnival Cruise Line	2001	88,500	Operating.	Carnival Spirit in Sydney, 2014
Carnival Splendor	Carnival Cruise Line	2008	113,300	Operating	Carnival Splendor at Circular Quay, Sydney, 2022
Carnival Sunrise	Carnival Cruise Line	1999	101,509	Operating	Carnival Sunrise off Nassau
Carnival Sunshine	Carnival Cruise Line	1996	102,853	Operating. Originally, the Carnival Destiny (renamed after refit)	Carnival Sunshine in 2023
Carnival Valor	Carnival Cruise Line	2004	110,000	Operating	Carnival Valor in Costa Maya, 2022
Carnival Venezia	Carnival Cruise Line	2019	135,225	Operating. Transferred to Carnival in 2023 under Fun Italian Style	Carnival Venezia in Bermuda, 2023
Carnival Vista	Carnival Cruise Line	2015	133,500	Operating	Carnival Vista in Willemstad, 2016
Celebrity Century	Celebrity Cruises	1995	71,545	Operating as Marella Discovery 2 since 2015 Originally, the Century	
Celebrity Constellation	Celebrity Cruises	2002	91,000	Operating. Originally, the Constellation	
Celebrity Eclipse	Celebrity Cruises	2010	122,000	Operating	
Celebrity Edge	Celebrity Cruises	2018		Operating	
Celebrity Equinox	Celebrity Cruises	2009	122,000	Operating	
Celebrity Infinity	Celebrity Cruises	2001	91,000	Operating. Originally, the Infinity	
Celebrity Millennium	Celebrity Cruises	2000	91,000	Operating. Originally, the Millennium	
Celebrity Reflection	Celebrity Cruises	2012	126,000	Operating	
Celebrity Silhouette	Celebrity Cruises	2011	122,000	Operating	
Celebrity Solstice	Celebrity Cruises	2008	122,000	Operating	
Celebrity Summit	Celebrity Cruises	2001	91,000	Operating. Originally, the Summit	
Celebrity Xpedition	Celebrity Cruises	2001	2,842	Operating	
Celestyal Crystal	Celestyal Cruises	1980	25,611	Scrapped in 2025. Originally, the Viking Saga, formerly: Sally Albatross, Leeward, SuperStar Taurus, Silja Opera, Opera, Cristal, Louis Cristal	
Celestyal Discovery	Celestyal Cruises	2003	42,289	Operating. Originally, the AIDAaura	
Celestyal Journey	Celestyal Cruises	1994	55,819	Operating. Originally, the Ryndam, formerly: Pacific Aria, Aegean Goddess	
China Star	China Cruise Company	1992	20,295	Operating. Originally, the Radisson Diamond, sold in 2005 and renamed twice, as the Omar Star and Asia Star. Sold in 2011 as China Star.	
Clio	Grand Circle Cruises	1998	3,504	Operating. Originally, the Le Levant, formerly: Tere Moana	
Clipper Adventurer	Clipper Group	1975	4,376	Operating as a charter vessel to several tour companies	
Clipper Odyssey	Clipper Group	1989	5,218	Operating on a long-term charter to Zegrahm Expeditions	
Club Med 2	Club Med	1996	14,983	Operating	
Columbus	Cruise & Maritime Voyages	1989	63,786	Formerly: Star Princess, Arcadia, Ocean Village, Pacific Pearl scrapped in Alang 2021	
Constitution	American Hawaii Cruises	1951	23,754	Sank. Formerly sailed in Hawaii with twin ship Independence	
Coral	Louis Cruise Lines	1975	14,194	Formerly Cunard Adventurer, Sunward II, Triton. Sold for scrap in 2014.	
Coral Princess	Princess Cruises	2003	91,627	Operating	
Costa Allegra	Costa Cruises	1969	28,500	Scrapped in 2012 after a fire. Originally built as the container ship Annie Johnson. Later: MS Regent Moon, MS Alexandra, Santa Cruise	
Costa Concordia	Costa Cruises	2006	114,500	Ran aground, capsized and partially sank off Isola del Giglio, Italy in 2012; Salvaged and raised in 2013/2014. Towed to Genoa, Italy for scrapping. Scrapping completed in 2017.	
Costa Deliziosa	Costa Cruises	2010	92,700	Operating (Hybrid Spirit/Vista Class)	
Costa Diadema	Costa Cruises	2014	130,000	Operating	
Costa Fascinosa	Costa Cruises	2012	114,500	Operating	
Costa Favolosa	Costa Cruises	2011	114,500	Operating	
Costa Fortuna	Costa Cruises	2003	102,699	Operating	
Costa Magica	Costa Cruises	2004	102,587	Operating	
Costa neoRomantica	Costa Cruises	1993	53,000	scrapped in Gadani 2022 as the Antares Experience	
Costa Pacifica	Costa Cruises	2009	114,500	Operating	
Costa Serena	Costa Cruises	2007	115,500	Operating	
Costa Victoria	Costa Cruises	1996	76,000	Scrapped in 2021, Aliaga	
Costa Voyager	Costa Cruises	2011	24,391	Operating. Entered service as Olympic Voyager, former Olympia Voyager, Grand Voyager, Voyager, Grand Voyager.	
Crown Princess	Princess Cruises	2006	113,000	Operating	
Crystal Serenity	Crystal Cruises	2003	68,870	Operating	
Crystal Symphony	Crystal Cruises	1995	51,044	Operating	
Cunard Ambassador	Cunard Line	1972	14,160	Burnt 1974, rebuilt into a livestock carrier, renamed Linda Clausen, later Procyon, Raslan. Scrapped 1984 after a second fire.	
Delphin	Delphin Seereisen/Hansa Touristik	1975	16,214	Scrapped in 2022, Aliaga. Formerly: Kazakhstan II, Belorussiya	
Diamond Princess	Princess Cruises	2004	115,875	Operating	
Discovery	Voyages of Discovery	1971	20,216	Scrapped as the Amen in 2014, Alang. Formerly: Island Venture, Island Princess, Hyundai Pungak Platinum	
Discovery I	Discovery Cruises	1970		Scrapped. First named Bleheim and owned by Fed Olsen Ltd in 1970, then operated under the name Sandinavian Sea by Scandinavian World Cruises in 1981, then renamed Venus Venture in 1985.	
Discovery Princess	Princess Cruises	2022	145,000		
Disney Adventure	Disney Cruise Line	2025	208,000	Operating	
Disney Destiny	Disney Cruise Line	2025	144,000	Operating	
Disney Dream	Disney Cruise Line	2011	128,000	Operating	
Disney Fantasy	Disney Cruise Line	2012	128,000	Operating	
Disney Magic	Disney Cruise Line	1998	83,338	Operating	
Disney Treasure	Disney Cruise Line	2024	144,000	Operating	
Disney Wish	Disney Cruise Line	2022	144,000	Operating	
Disney Wonder	Disney Cruise Line	1999	85,000	Operating	
Dolphin IV	Dolphin Cruise Line	1979	13,007	Formerly: the Zion (1956–66), the Amélia de Mello (1966–72), the Ithaca (1972–79), operated as the Dolphin IV for the Dolphin Cruise Line (1979–1998) and the Cape Canaveral Cruise Line (1998–2000), laid up in 2000, sent to the breakers in 2003	
easyCruiseOne	easyCruise	2005	4,077	Laid up since 2008. Scrapped in 2022. Formerly: Renaissance Two, The Neptune	
Elysium	Elixir Cruises	1998	1,610	Operating. Formerly: Emerald Dream, Xperience, Celebrity Xperience, Eclipse	
The Emerald	Louis Cruise Lines/Thomson Cruises	1997	26,428	Scrapped in 2012. Formerly: Regent Rainbow, Diamond Island, Santa Rosa	
Emerald Princess	Princess Cruises	2007	113,000	Operating	
Empress	Cordelia Cruises	1990	48,563	Operating. Nordic Empress from 1990 – 2004. MS Empress 2008 – 2016. Empress of the Seas 2004 – 2008, 2016–2020.	
Empress of Canada	CP Ships	1961	27,284	Scrapped. Built as an ocean liner, sold to Carnival Cruise Lines in 1972, and became its first ship, the Mardi Gras. Sold in 1993 to Epirotiki Line, and renamed the Olympic, Star of Texas, unLucky Star and Apollon. Sold for scrap in 2003.	
Enchanted Capri	Demar Instaladora y Constructora, S.A de C.V. México	1976	16,331	Grounded in 2020. Formerly: Azerbaihzan, Arkadia, Island Holiday	
Enchanted Isle	Commodore Cruise Line	1958	23,395	Ended service in 2000; scrapped in 2004 as New Orleans	
Enchanted Princess	Princess Cruises	2021	145,281		
Enchanted Seas	Commodore Cruise Line	1957	23,500	Ended service 1995 & scrapped 2004	
Enchantment of the Seas	Royal Caribbean International	1997	82,910	Operating. Extended in 2005.	
Enrico C. / Enrico Costa	Costa Cruises	1965	15,889	Formerly Provence. Ended service 1994; later Symphony, Aegean Spirit, Ocean Glory I, Classica. Scrapped 2001.	
Eugenio C	Costa Cruises	1966	30,567	Ended service 1997. Later Edinburgh Castle, The Big Red Boat II. Sold for scrap 2005.	
Eurodam	Holland America Line	2008	86,000	Operating	
Europa	Hapag-Lloyd Cruises	1999	28,890	Operating	
Evrima	Ritz-Carlton Yacht Collection	2022	25,401	Operating. First vessel of the line; completed at the Astander shipyard in Santander, Spain, more than three years behind schedule after the original builder's collapse.	Evrima
Explorer	G Adventures	1969	2,398	Sank in 2007. Formerly: Society Explorer, Linbald Explorer	
Explorer Dream	Dream Cruises	1999	75,338	Operating. Formerly Superstar Virgo of Star Cruises	
Explorer of the Seas	Royal Caribbean International	2000	138,194	Operating	
Exploris One	Exploris	1989	6,072	Operating. Formerly: Delfin Clipper, Sally Clipper, Baltic Clipper, Delfin Star, Dream 21, World Discoverer, World Adventurer, Prince Albert II, Silver Explorer	
Fairsea	Sitmar Cruises	1956	16,627	Former ocean liner Carinthia. Ended operation in 1988. Subsequently, Fair Princess, China Sea Discovery. Scrapped 2005.	
Fairsky	Sitmar Cruises	1958	12,464	Migrant passenger ship working as part-time cruise ship 1958–73. Full-time cruise ship 1974–77. Scrapped following a fire, 1980.	
Fairstar	Sitmar Cruises	1964	21,619	Migrant passenger ship working as part-time cruise ship 1964–74, then full-time cruising. Allocated to P&O Australia fleet in 1988. Ended operation in 1997 and scrapped.	
Fedor Shalyapin	Far East Shipping Company	1971	21,717	Former ocean liner RMS Ivernia, scrapped in Alang, India 2005	
50 Let Pobedy ("Fifty Years of Victory")	various owners	2009	23,439	Nuclear powered expedition ship. In service.	50 Let Pobedy at North 88°
Fort Victoria	Various operators	1912	7,784	Sank on 18 December 1929 after being hit amidships by SS Algonquin	
Fram	Hurtigruten	2007	11,700	In service	Fram at Brown Station
Franca C	Costa Cruises	1952		Ended service in 1977. Now operated by Gute Bücher für Alle as MV Doulos Phos, a travelling book shop	
Franconia	Cunard Line	1963	21,717	Scrapped Alang, India 2005	
Freedom of the Seas	Royal Caribbean International	2006	154,407	Operating	
Freewinds	Church of Scientology	1986	10,328	Operating; formerly Boheme	
Galapagos Legend	Galatours	1963	2,890	Operating. Formerly Helgoland, Stena Finlandica, Baltic Star	
Gemini	Celestyal Cruises	1995	19,093	Operating. Formerly Cunard Crown Jewel, Superstar Gemini, Vision Star, built as Crown Jewel.	
Genting Dream	Dream Cruises	2016	150,695	Operating	
Glen Massan	The Majestic Line	2006		Operating. Formerly a fishing trawler	
Glen Tarsan	The Majestic Line	2007		Operating. Formerly a fishing trawler.	
Golden Horizon	Tradewind Voyages	2021	8,770 GT	Entered service in 2021. Largest sailing ship ever built.	
Golden Iris	Mano Maritime	1977	16,852	Formerly Cunard Conquest, Cunard Princess, and Rhapsody, broken up in Aliaga in 2022	
Golden Princess	Eurasia International	1967	12,704	Entered service as Finlandia, later Finstarr, for Finnlines. Left service in 1980; renamed successively Instarr, Pearl of Scandinavia, Ocean Pearl, Costa Playa, Oriental Pearl, Joy Wave. Operating since 2000 as MS Golden Princess.	
Grand Celebration	Bahamas Paradise Cruise Line	1987	47,262	Entered service as Celebration.2008 as Iberocruceros Grand Celebration scrapped 2021 at Alang	
Grand Princess	Princess Cruises	1998	108,806	Operating	
Grandeur of the Seas	Royal Caribbean International	1996	73,817	Operating	
Gripsholm	Swedish America Line	1925	17,944	Combined ocean liner/cruise ship. Ended service 1954. Later Berlin, scrapped 1966.	
Gripsholm	Swedish America Line	1957	23,191	Combined ocean liner/cruise ship, built as sister ship to the Kungsholm. Sold to Karageorgis Lines in 1975, renamed the Navarino. Sold to Regency Cruises in 1984 as the Regent Sea, operated until 1995. Sunk 2001.	
Hamburg	Plantours	1997	15,000	Operating; formerly Columbus for Hapag-Lloyd	
Hanseatic	Hamburg Atlantic Line	1930	30,030	Burnt 1966. Formerly ocean liner Empress of Scotland, built as Empress of Japan.	
Harmony of the Seas	Royal Caribbean International	2016	227,000	Operating	
Harmony Princess	Polaris Shipping	1969	25,500	Scrapped in 2014. Originally built as the container ship Axel Johnson. Later: MS Regent Sun, MS Italia, Costa Marina	
Hebridean Princess	Hebridean Island Cruises	1989	2,112	Operating	
Heritage Adventurer	Heritage Expeditions	1993	8,378	Operating, formerly: Society Adventurer, Hanseatic, and RCGS Resolute	
Homeric	Home Lines	1932	18,563	Burned in 1973, and scrapped in 1974. Originally the ocean liner Mariposa.	
Hondius	Oceanwide Expeditions	2019	6,603	Operating	
Horizon	Pullmantur Cruises	1990	46,811	Scrapped in 2022. Formerly Horizon, Island Star, Pacific Dream, Horizon L'Horizon	
Icon of the Seas	Royal Caribbean International	2024	248,663	Delivery 2023, LNG powered	The ship Icon Of The Seas
Ilma	Ritz-Carlton Yacht Collection	2024	46,750	Operating. First LNG-powered vessel in the fleet; built by Chantiers de l'Atlantique.	Ilma
Independence	Atlantic Far East Lines / American Hawaiian Cruises	1951	23,719	Renamed Oceanic Independence (1974–79), renamed the Independence (1982–2006), renamed the Oceanic (2006), sold for scrap in 2008	
Independence	American Cruise Lines	2010	3,000	Operating	
Independence of the Seas	Royal Caribbean International	2008	154,407	Operating	
Insignia	Oceania Cruises	1998	30,277	formerly R One, Insignia, Columbus 2	
Iona	P&O Cruises	2020	184,089	Operating.	Iona in Cádiz
Island Escape	Island Cruises	1982	40,132	Scrapped in 2018	
Island Princess	Princess Cruises	2003	92,000	Operating	
Island Sky	Noble Caledonia	1992	90,600	Operating. Formerly: MS Renaissance Eight, MS Renai II, MS Sky	
Ivan Franko	Black Sea Shipping Company	1964	19,861	Scrapped 1997 under name Fran	
Jewel of the Seas	Royal Caribbean International	2004	90,090	Operating	
Karnika	Jalesh Cruises	1990	70,285	Formerly: Crown Princes (1990–2002) A'Rosa Blu (2002–2004) Aidablu (2004–2007) Ocean Village Two (2007–2009) Pacific Jewl (2009–2019) scrapped at Alang 2021.	
Klavdiya Yelanskaya	Murmansk Shipping	1977	4,329	Operating.	
Knyaz Vladimir	Black Sea Cruises	1971	9,159	Operating from 11 June 2017. Built as MS Eagle for Southern Ferries, sailed for Paquet Cruises as the Azur, then for Chandris as The Azur, Eloise, Royal Iris, Roy Star.	
Koningsdam	Holland America Line	2016	99,500	Operating.	
Kungsholm	Swedish American Line	1953	21,164	Sold in 1965. Later Europa, Columbus C.. Sunk 1984.	
L'Amant	Phoenix Voyages	2009		Built in 2009 by the Vietnamese shipyard, Vuot Song, L'Amant operates on the Mekong River in Vietnam.	
L'Austral	Ponant Cruises	2011	10,700	Operating	
Le Bellot	Ponant Cruises	2020	10,700	Operating	
Le Boréal	Ponant Cruises	2010	10,700	Operating	
Le Bougainville	Ponant Cruises	2019	9,900	Operating	
Le Champlain	Ponant Cruises	2017	9,900	Operating	
Le Commandant Charcot	Ponant Cruises	2017	31,283	Operating	
Le Diamant	Ponant Cruises	2004	8,282	Operating; formerly: Song of Flower, Explorer Starship	
Le Dumont-d'Urville	Ponant Cruises	2019	9,900	Operating	
Le Jacques Cartier	Ponant Cruises	2020	9,900	Operating	
Le Lapérouse	Ponant Cruises	2018	9,900	Operating	
Le Levant	Ponant Cruises	1999	3,504	Operating	
Le Lyrial	Ponant Cruises	2015	10,944	Operating	
Le Ponant	Ponant Cruises	1991	1,489	Operating	
Le Soléal	Ponant Cruises	1991	10,992	Operating	
Legacy	Windjammer Barefoot Cruises	1997		Cut up for scrap at Puerto Caldera, Costa Rica	
Legend of the Seas	Royal Caribbean International	2026	248,663	Operating	
Leisure World	New Century Cruise Lines	1969	16,254	Scrapped in 2021. Formerly: Skyward (1969–1991), Shangri-La World (1991–1992), Asean World (1992), Fantasy World (1992–1993), Leisure World (1993–2021)	
Leonardo da Vinci	Italian Line	1960	33,340	Ended service in 1978. Scrapped 1982.	
Leonid Sobinov	Black Sea Shipping Company	1974	21,370	Formerly: Saxonia, Carmania. Ended service 1995. Scrapped 1999.	
Liberty of the Seas	Royal Caribbean International	2007	154,407	Operating.	
Lofoten	Hurtigruten	1964	2,621	Became a training ship in 2021.	
Lord of the Glens	Magna Carta Steamship Company Ltd	2000	729	Cruises Caledonian Canal and North of Scotland	
Luminara	Ritz-Carlton Yacht Collection	2025	46,750	Operating. Sister ship to Ilma.	Luminara
Lyubov Orlova		1976	4,251	Operated as a charter vessel to several tour companies; sold for scrap to Neptune International Shipping, February 2012. Broke loose under tow from St John's to the Dominican Republic and was abandoned in international waters off Newfoundland in February, 2013.	
Maasdam	Holland America Line	1993	55,451	Operating	
Magellan	Cruise & Maritime Voyages	1985	46,052	Entered service as Holiday, operated 2010–2014 by Ibero Cruises as Grand Holiday, sold for scrap in 2020. Scrapped at Alang in 2021	
Majestic Princess	Princess Cruises	2017	144,216		
Majesty of the Oceans	Seajets	1992	73,941	Laid up, Formerly: Majesty of the Seas, Majesty	Majesty of the Seas
Manara	Aroya Cruises	2017	150,695	Operating. Formerly: World Dream	
Mandalay	Sail Windjammer	1982	585	Operating. Formerly operated by Windjammer Barefoot Cruises.	
Marco Polo	Orient Lines / Transocean Tours	1991	22,181	Formerly Alexandr Pushkin, sold for scrap in 2020. Scrapped at Alang in 2021	
Mardi Gras	Carnival Cruise Line	2021	181,808	Operating	
Marella Celebration	TUI Cruises/Marella Cruises	2005	33,933	Laid up awaiting scrapping. Formerly Noordam, Thomson Celebration	
Marella Discovery	TUI Cruises/Thomson Cruises/Marella Cruises	1996	69,130	Operating. Originally, the Splendour of the Seas, formerly: TUI Discovery	
Marella Discovery 2	Marella Cruises	1995	69,472	Operating. Formerly: Legend of the Seas, TUI Discovery 2.	
Marella Dream	TUI Cruises/Marella Cruises	2010	54,763	Scrapped in 2022. Formerly Homeric, Westerdam, Costa Europa, Thomson Dream	
Marella Explorer	TUI Cruises/Marella Cruises	2009	76,522	Operating. Formerly owned by Celebrity Cruises (1996–2009); formerly named Galaxy, Celebrity Galaxy, Mein Schiff, Mein Schiff 1	
Marella Spirit	Louis Cruise Lines/Thomson Cruises/Marella Cruises	2002	33,930	Formerly: Nieuw Amsterdam, Patriot, Nieuw Amsterdam, Spirit, Thomson Spirit. Scrapped at Alang in 2018	
Margaritaville at Sea Islander	Margaritaville at Sea	2000	86,000	Operating, Formerly: Costa Atlantica	
Margaritaville at Sea Paradise	Margaritaville at Sea	1992	52,926	Operating, Formerly: Costa Classica, Costa neoClassica	
Marina	Oceania Cruises	2011	66,084	Operating	
Mariner of the Seas	Royal Caribbean International	2003	138,000	Operating	
Mauretania	Cunard Line	1906	31,938	Scrapped at Rosyth in 1935	
Mauretania	Cunard Line	1938	35, 738	Scrapped at Ward's Shipbreaking in 1965	
Maxim Gorkiy	Black Sea Shipping Company; Phoenix Reisen	1974	24,981	Ended service November 2008. Formerly Hanseatic, built as Hamburg.	
Mein Schiff 1	TUI Cruises	2018	111,500	Operating	
Mein Schiff 2	TUI Cruises	2019	111,500	Operating	
Mein Schiff 3	TUI Cruises	2014	99,526	Operating	
Mein Schiff 4	TUI Cruises	2015	99,526	Operating	
Mein Schiff 5	TUI Cruises	2016	98,785	Operating	
Mein Schiff 6	TUI Cruises	2017	98,811	Operating	
Mein Schiff 7	TUI Cruises	2024	112,982	Operating	
Mein Schiff Herz	TUI Cruises	2011	77,302	Operating. Formerly owned by Celebrity Cruises (1997–2011); formerly named Mercury, Celebrity Mercury, Mein Schiff 2	
Midnatsol	Hurtigruten	2003		Operating	
Mikhail Lermontov	Black Sea Shipping Company	–		Hit a reef and sank off Picton, New Zealand in 1986	
Minerva	Swan Hellenic	2008	12,500	Recommenced operation for Swan Hellenic cruises after leaving Swan Hellenic in 2003	
Mona Lisa	Holiday Kreuzfahrten	1965	27,670	Formerly Kungsholm,Sea Princess,Victoria,Oceanic II. Scrapped in 2016.	
Monarch	Pullmantur Cruises	1991	73,941	Operated for Pullmantur after being switched from Royal Caribbean in 2013. Sold for scrap in 2020	
Monet	Elegant Cruises	1970		Refurbished and designed to serve as a large luxury yacht in 1997.	
Monte Cervantes	Hamburg Süd	1927	13,913	Sank in 1930 after striking an uncharted rock near Tierra del Fuego.	
Monte Rosa	Hamburg Süd	1930	13,882	Confiscated by the British after World War 2. Renamed Empire Windrush and used as a troopship. Caught fire and sank in 1954.	
Monterey	MSC Italian Cruises	1952	20,046	A Matson cruise ship constructed from a C4 Mariner-class hull formerly named Free State Mariner; renamed Monte in 2006 broken up for scrap in 2007	
MSC Armonia	MSC Italian Cruises	Post-2001	58,174	Formerly: MS European Vision (2001–2004), currently operating	
MSC Bellissima	MSC Italian Cruises	2019	171,598		
MSC Divina	MSC Italian Cruises	2012	139,400	Operating	
MSC Euribia	MSC Italian Cruises	2023	184,011		
MSC Fantasia	MSC Italian Cruises	2008	137,936	Operating	
MSC Grandiosa	MSC Italian Cruises	2019	181,541		
MSC Lirica	MSC Italian Cruises	2003	58,825	Operating	
MSC Magnifica	MSC Italian Cruises	2010	93,330	Operating	
MSC Melody	MSC Italian Cruises	1982	35,143	Retired in January 2013. Later partially sank in layup and was subsequently salvaged. Sold for scrap summer 2018. Formerly: Atlantic, StarShip Atlantic, Melody, Qing	
MSC Meraviglia	MSC Italian Cruises	2017	171,598		
MSC Musica	MSC Italian Cruises	2006	89,600	Operating	
MSC Opera	MSC Italian Cruises	2004	58,058	Operating	
MSC Orchestra	MSC Italian Cruises	2007	89,600	Operating	
MSC Poesia	MSC Italian Cruises	2008	93,330	Operating	
MSC Preziosa	MSC Italian Cruises	2013	139,072	Operating	
MSC Seascape	MSC Italian Cruises	2022	170,400	Operating	
MSC Seashore	MSC Italian Cruises	2021	170,412		
MSC Seaside	MSC Italian Cruises	2017	153,516		
MSC Seaview	MSC Italian Cruises	2018	153,516		
MSC Sinfonia	MSC Italian Cruises	2005	58,625	Formerly: MS European Stars (2002–2004), currently operating	
MSC Splendida	MSC Italian Cruises	2009	137,936	Operating	
MSC Virtuosa	MSC Italian Cruises	2021	181,541		
MSC World America	MSC Italian Cruises	2025	216,638	Operating. Second MSC World Class ship.	
MSC World Europa	MSC Italian Cruises	2022	215,863	Operating.	MSC World Europa in La Rochelle
National Geographic Endeavour	Lindblad Expeditions	1966	3,132	Scrapped, originally, the Marburg, formerly Lindmar, North Star, Caledonian Star, Endeavour,	
National Geographic Explorer	Lindblad Expeditions	1982	6,167	Operating, originally, the Midnatsol, formerly Midnatsol II, Lyngen	
National Geographic Orion	Lindblad Expeditions	2003	4,000	Operating, formerly known as Orion	
National Geographic Sea Bird	Lindblad Expeditions	1982	630	Operating, originally, the Majestic Explorer, formerly known as Sea Bird	
Nautica	Oceania Cruises	2005	30,277	Operating. Originally the R Five	
Navigator of the Seas	Royal Caribbean International	2002	139,999	Operating	
Nieuw Amsterdam	Holland America Line	2010	86,700	Operating	
Noordam	Holland America Line	2006	82,500	Operating	
Nordkapp	Hurtigruten	1996	11,386	Operating	
Nordlys	Hurtigruten	1993	11,204	Operating	
Nordnorge	Hurtigruten	1997	11,286	Operating	
Nordstjernen	Hurtigruten	1956	2,191	Operating	
Norway	Norwegian Cruise Line	1980	76,049	Former ocean liner France. Ended operations in May 2003 due to a boiler explosion. Was scrapped as Blue Lady in Alang 2008.	
Norwegian Bliss	Norwegian Cruise Line	2018	168,028	Operating	
Norwegian Breakaway	Norwegian Cruise Line	2013	145,655	Operating	
Norwegian Dawn	Norwegian Cruise Line	2002	92,250	Operating. Originally to be named SuperStar Scorpio.	
Norwegian Encore	Norwegian Cruise Line	2019	169,145		
Norwegian Epic	Norwegian Cruise Line	2010	155,873	Operating	
Norwegian Escape	Norwegian Cruise Line	2015	165,300	Operating	
Norwegian Gem	Norwegian Cruise Line	2007	93,530	Operating	
Norwegian Getaway	Norwegian Cruise Line	2014	145,655	Operating	
Norwegian Jade	Norwegian Cruise Line	2006	93,558	Operating	
Norwegian Jewel	Norwegian Cruise Line	2005	93,502	Operating	
Norwegian Joy	Norwegian Cruise Line	2017	167,725	Operating	
Norwegian Pearl	Norwegian Cruise Line	2006	93,530	Operating	
Norwegian Prima	Norwegian Cruise Line	2022	142,500		
Norwegian Sky	Norwegian Cruise Line	1999	77,104	Renamed in 2003 to Pride of Aloha, and back to Norwegian Sky in 2008 Operating	
Norwegian Spirit	Norwegian Cruise Line	2004	75,904	Operating. Formerly SuperStar Leo	
Norwegian Star	Norwegian Cruise Line	2001	91,740	Operating. Originally to be named SuperStar Libra	
Norwegian Sun	Norwegian Cruise Line	2001	78,309	Operating	
Norwegian Viva	Norwegian Cruise Line	2023	142,500		
Oasis of the Seas	Royal Caribbean International	2009	225,282	Operating	
Ocean Atlantic	Quark Expeditions	1986	12,798	Scrapped in 2025, originally built as the ferry Konstantin Chernenko, formerly: Rus (ru), Rus (rebuilt to a cruise ship in 2009), SC Atlantic	
Ocean Countess	Royal Olympic Cruises, Monarch Classic Cruises	1976	17,593	Formerly: Cunard Countess, Awani Dream II, Olympia Countess, Lili Marleen, Ruby, Olympic Countess	Ocean Countess in Helsinki
Ocean Dream	Ocean Dream Cruise (Thailand) Co. Ltd.	1970	17,042	Formerly: Seaward, Spirit of London, Sun Princess, Starship Majestic, Southern Cross, Flamenco, New Flamenco, Flamenco I, Ocean Dream IMO 7211517. Abandoned by owners and sank off Laem Chebang Port in Thailand 27 February 2016	
Ocean Dream	Peace Boat	1981	35,190	Scrapped in 2021 in Alang. Formerly: Tropicale, Costa Tropicale, Pacific Star	
Ocean Endeavour	Fleetpro Ocean	1982	12,688	Operating. Built as Konstantin Siminov for Baltic Shipping. Formerly: Francesca, The Iris, Kristina Katarina, The Iris, Kristina Katarina	
Ocean Life	easyCruise	1981	9,878	Scrapped in 2014. Formerly: easyCruise Life, Farah, The Jasmine, Palmira, Natasha, built as Lev Tolstoy, IMO 7625809	
Ocean Majesty	Majestic International Cruises	1966	10,417	Operating. Originally, the Juan March, formerly: Sol Christina, Kypros Star, Ocean Majesty, Olympic, Homeric.	
Ocean Mist		1956	5,067	Originally, the San Giorgio, formerly: City of Andros, Ocean Islander, Royal Star; sold for scrap in 2012.	
Ocean Odyssey	Indian Ocean Cruises	1965	4,561	Originally, the Eros, formerly: Jason, Iason; scrapped in 2009	
Ocean Odyssey	Vantage Cruise Line	2022	8,228	Laid-Up	
Ocean Pearl	Quail Cruises	1970	19,300	Formerly: Song of Norway, Sundream, Dream Princess, Dream, Clipper Pearl, MS Clipper Pacific, Festival	
Ocean Princess	Princess Cruises	2009	30,277	Formerly: R Four, Tahitian Princess	
Ocean Princess	Ocean Cruise Lines	1984		Sank March 1993 in Amazon'	
Ocean Star Pacific	Ocean Star Cruises	1971	23,149	Operating; formerly: Nordic Prince, Carousel, Arielle, Aquamarine	
Ocean Voyager	American Queen Voyages	2001	4,954	Formerly: Cape May Light, Sea Voyager, Saint Laurent, Victory I	
Oceana	P&O Cruises	2003	77,499	Operating. Formerly: Ocean Princess	
OceanBreeze	Dolphin Cruise Lines / Premier Cruise Line	1955	20,204	Formerly: Southern Cross, Calypso, Calypso I, Azure Seas. Scrapped 2003.	
Oceanic	Peace Boat	1965	38,772	Scrapped in 2012. Formerly: Oceanic, StarShip Oceanic, Big Red Boat 1	
Oceanic Discoverer	Coral Princess Cruises	2005	2,000	Formerly: Oceanic Princess	
Oceanic Independence	American Hawaiian Cruises / American Global Line	1974	23,719	Named formerly (1951–1974) and subsequently renamed (1982–2006) Independence, renamed Oceanic (2006) and then Platinum II (2009), sold for scrap in 2008 but remains in mothballs	
Oceanos	Starlight Cruises	1952	14,000	Sank off South Africa's eastern coast on 4 August 1991.	
Odyssey of the Seas	Royal Caribbean International	2021	167,704		
Ola Esmeralda	Ola Cruises	1966	11,209	Scrapped 2013. Formerly: Venus and Black Prince.	
Oosterdam	Holland America Line	2003	81,769	Operating	
Oranje	Netherland Line / Lauro Lines	1939	20,117 / 24,377	Sunk. Built as a passenger liner, was a hospital ship during WWII. Sold to Lauro Lines in 1964, rebuilt and renamed Angelina Lauro. Destroyed by fire on 30 March 1979, in Charlotte Amalie, St. Thomas. Refloated in July 1979, sank in September 1979 in the Pacific Ocean, while on the way to Taiwan to be scrapped.	
Oriana	Orient Steam Navigation Company	1973	41,910	Formerly served as an ocean liner. Retired in 1986. Served as a floating hotel until 2002. Damaged in a storm in 2004, then dismantled.	
Oriana	Astro Ocean	1995	69,153	Operated with P&O Cruises from launch until 2019. Sold to Astro Ocean as Mv Piano Land. Operates as a casino ship for Chinese market.	
Orient Queen	Louis Cruises	1968	16,000	In 2018, she was sold for scrap, and was broken up at Alang, India on 17 July 2018.	
Orient Queen	Abou Merhi Cruises	1989	7,500	Sank during the 2020 Beirut explosion, formerly; Vistamar, Orient Queen II, and Med Queen	Vistamar
Oriental Dragon	Capital Dragon Global Holdings Limited	1972	18,455	Scrapped 2022 in Gadani. Formerly: Sun Viking, SuperStar Sagittarius, Hyundai Pongnae, Omar III, Long Jie	
Ovation of the Seas	Royal Caribbean International	2016	168,666	Operating	
Pacific Eden	P&O Cruises Australia	1993	55,451	Operating. Formerly MS Statendam.	
Pacific Explorer	Cruise West			Operating. Formerly: Temptress Explorer	
Pacific Princess	Princess Cruises	1971	19,903	Scrapped in 2013. Originally named Sea Venture, sold and renamed Pacific in 2002. Also known for being The Love Boat.	
Pacific Princess	Princess Cruises / P&O Cruises Australia	2002	30,200	Operating. Formerly: R Three.	
Pacific Venus	Venus Cruise	1998	26,594	Operating	
Pacifique	Club Mediterranée	1953	13,473	Destroyed by fire in 1974, scrapped in 1976.	
Pallas Athena	Epirotiki	1952	20,469	Formerly ocean liner SS Flandre, Carla C, Carla Costa. Destroyed by fire and scrapped in 1994.	
Palm Beach Princess	Palm Beach Casino Line	1964	6,659	Retired in 2010. Was scrapped in 2015. Formerly" Viking Princess, built as Ilmatar.	
Paul Gauguin	Regent Seven Seas Cruises	1998	19,200	Operating	
Pearl Mist	Pearl Sea Cruises	2014	5,109	Operating	
Pearl Seaways	DFDS	1993	40,022	Operating. Formerly: Athena, Star Aquarius, Langkapuri Star Aquarius, Aquarius MS Pearl of Scandinavia.	
Polaris	Murmansk Shipping	1968	2,097	Scrapped in 2019. Formerly: Disko, Shearwater, Brand Polaris, Viking Polaris.	
Porto	Portuscale Cruises	1965	5,888	Scrapped in 2018 in Aliaga. Originally: the Istra, formerly: Astra, Astra I, Arion, Nautilus 2000, Arion	
Pride of America	NCL America	2005	80,000	Operating	
Princess Daphne	Classic International Cruises	1955	15,833	Scrapped 2014 under the name Daphne. Originally, the Port Sydney, formerly Akrotiri Express, Daphne, Switzerland, Ocean Odyssey, Ocean Monarch	
Quantum of the Seas	Royal Caribbean International	2014	168,666	Operating, cruise ship	
Queen Anne	Cunard Line	2024	113,000	Operating, cruise ship	
Queen Elizabeth	Cunard Line	2010	90,901	Operating, cruise ship	
Queen Mary 2	Cunard Line	2004	148,528	Operating, ocean liner	
Queen Victoria	Cunard Line	2007	90,746	Operating, cruise ship	
Radiance of the Seas	Royal Caribbean International	2001	90,090	Operating	
Regal Empress	Imperial Majesty Cruises	1953	23,979	Formerly: SS Olympia (1953–81), Caribe (1981–83), and Caribe I (1983–93). Laid up and sold for scrap in 2009	
Regal Princess	Princess Cruises	2014	142,229	Operating	
Regatta	Oceania Cruises	2003	30,277	Operating. Formerly: Insignia; built as R Two.	
Renaissance	Paquet Cruises	1966	12,000	Scrapped in 2010	
Rex Fortune	Island Ship	1974	9,848	Beached hotel in Cambodia. Former Macau Success, Omar II, Astra II, built as Golden Odyssey	
Rhapsody of the Seas	Royal Caribbean International	1997	78,491	Operating	
Riviera	Oceania Cruises	2012	66,084	Operating	
Rotterdam	Holland America Line	1959	38,650	Sold to Premier Cruises in 1997. Withdrawn from service in 2000. A foundation was created in 2001 to find a new vocation for the ship in Rotterdam. As of 2010, the ship is used as a recreational and tourist attraction in the city of Rotterdam.	
Rotterdam	Holland America Line	2021	99,935	Operating	
Royal Clipper	Star Clippers	2000	5,000	Operating	
Royal Pacific	Sophlex Ship Managers	1967	9,805	Capsized in Taiwan's Kaohsiung harbor in 2005. Built as Las Palmas de Gran Canaria in 1967, formerly: Crown del Mar, Don Juan, Riviera I	
Royal Pacific	Starlite	1965		Sank, formerly: Empress of Australia	
Royal Princess	Princess Cruises	2013	142,714	Operating	
Ruby Princess	Princess Cruises	2008	116,000	Operating	
Running on Waves	88parsec	2011	634	Operating	
Ryndam	Holland America Line	1994	55,451	Transferred November 2015 to P&O Cruises Australia as Pacific Aria	
Saga Rose	Saga Cruises	1965	24,474	Sold for scrap in May 2010; formerly Gripsholm, built as Sagafjord	
Saga Sapphire	Saga Cruises	1981	37,301	Operating; formerly: Europa, SuperStar Europe, SuperStar Aries, Holiday Dream, Bleu de France	
Salamis Filoxenia	Cypriot Salamis Cruises	1975	15,402	Scrapped in 2022 in Gadani as Titan. Formerly: Club I, Odessa Sky, Gruziya, Van Gogh	
Salamis Glory	Cypriot Salamis Cruises	1996	10,392	Formerly: Danaos, Constellation, Regent Spirit, Anna Nery. Scrapped in 2010	
Sapphire	Louis Cruise Lines	1967	12,263	Formerly: Italia, Ocean Princess, Sea Prince, Sea Prince V, Sea Prince (again), Princesa Oceanica. Sold for scrap in 2012.	
Sapphire Princess	Princess Cruises	2004	115,875	Operating	
Sea Breeze	Dolphin Cruise Lines	1958	21,000	Ended operation in 2000. Sank later that year. Formerly: Federico C., Royale, StarShip Royale	
Sea Cloud	Sea Cloud Cruises	1931	2,523	Operating, formerly: Hussar II, USCGC WPG-284, IX-99, Angelita, Patria, Antarna, Sea Cloud of Cayman	
Sea Cloud II	Sea Cloud Cruises	2001	3,849	Operating	
Sea Diamond	Louis Hellenic Cruise Lines	1986	22,412	Formerly: Birka Princess. Capsized and sank within the caldera of the Greek island of Santorini 6 April 2007 after running aground.	
Sea Explorer	Poseidon Expeditions	1991	4,200	Operating	
Sea Princess	Princess Cruises	1998	77,000	Transferred to P&O Cruises in 2002 as Adonia, but returned to Princess in 2005. Operating	
Seabourn Encore	Seabourn Cruise Line	2016	41,865		
Seabourn Odyssey	Seabourn Cruise Line	2009	32,346	Operating	
Seabourn Ovation	Seabourn Cruise Line	2018	41,865		
Seabourn Quest	Seabourn Cruise Line	2011	32,348	Operating	
Seabourn Sojourn	Seabourn Cruise Line	2010	32,346	Operating	
Seabourn Venture	Seabourn Cruise Line	2022	23,000		
SeaDream I	SeaDream Yacht Club	1984	4,333	Operating. Originally, the Sea Goddess I, formerly: Seabourn Goddess I	
SeaDream II	SeaDream Yacht Club	1985	4,333	Operating. Originally, the Sea Goddess II, formerly: Seabourn Goddess II	
Serenade of the Seas	Royal Caribbean International	2003	90,090	Operating	
Serenissima	Premier Cruises	1960	2,598	Operating; originally, the Harald Jarl, formerly: Andrea	
Seven Seas Mariner	Regent Seven Seas Cruises	2001	48,075	Operating	
Seven Seas Navigator	Regent Seven Seas Cruises	1999	28,550	Operating	
Seven Seas Voyager	Regent Seven Seas Cruises	2003	42,363	Operating	
Silver Cloud	Silversea Cruises	1994	16,800	Operating	
Silver Dawn	Silversea Cruises	2021	40,791	Operating	
Silver Endeavour	Silversea Cruises	2021	20,449	Operating. Formerly: Crystal Endeavour	
Silver Moon	Silversea Cruises	2020	40,791	Operating	
Silver Muse	Silversea Cruises	2017	40,791	Operating	
Silver Nova	Silversea Cruises	2023	54,700	Operating	
Silver Origin	Silversea Cruises	2020	6,365	Operating	
Silver Ray	Silversea Cruises	2024	54,700	Operating	
Silver Shadow	Silversea Cruises	2000	28,258	Operating	
Silver Spirit	Silversea Cruises	2009	39,519	Operating	
Silver Wind	Silversea Cruises	1995	16,800	Operating	
Silverstar	Silver Star Cruises	1952	5596 +	Formerly: LST HMS Bruiser (1942–1946) tonnage 5596, NILLA (1946–1951). Stern lengthened 22 feet (6.71 m), converted to SS Silverstar (1951–1956) chartered by Silver Star Cruises, charter transferred to Caribbean Cruise Lines December 1956; January 1957 sold to state-owned Flota Argentina de Navegación Fluvial (Buenos Aires) renamed CIUDAD DE SANTA FÉ (1957–1965), scrapped in Argentina in 1968.	
Sirena	Oceania Cruises	2016	30,277		
Siritara Ocean Queen	Siritara Enterprise	1964	6,262	Capsized in 2006. Originally, the Bashkiriya (1964–1992), Odessa Song (1992–1997), Royal Dream (1997–1998), Silver Star (1998–2003), Nandini (2003–2003), Olviara (2003–2004), Ocean Princess (2004–2006)	
Skorpios I	Cruceros Skorpios	1978		Scrapped in 2018	
Skorpios II	Cruceros Skorpios	1988	1,210	Operating	
Skorpios III	Cruceros Skorpios	1995	1,600	Operating	
Sky Princess	Princess Cruises	2019	145,281		
Southward	Norwegian Cruise Line	1971	16,710	Scrapped in 2014, later named: Seawing, Perla, and Aegean Pearl, Rio, and Venus.	
Sovereign	Pullmantur Cruises	1988	73,192	formerly: Sovereign of the Seas sold for scrap in 2020	
Spectrum of the Seas	Royal Caribbean International	2019	169,379		
Spirit of Adventure	Saga Cruises	2006	9,570	Operating; formerly: Berlin, Princess Mahsuri, Orange Melody	
Spirit of Alaska	Cruise West			Operating	
Spirit of Columbia	Cruise West			Operating	
Spirit of Discovery	Cruise West			Operating	
Spirit of Endeavour	Cruise West			Operating; formerly: Newport Clipper	
Spirit of Glacier Bay	Cruise West	1984		Operating; formerly: Spirit of Nantucket and Nantucket Clipper	
Spirit of Oceanus	Cruise West			Ended service 1992. Subsequently: Renaissance Five, Sun Viva, Megatar Sagittarius, Hanseatic Renaissance.	
Spirit of Yorktown	Cruise West	1988	2,354	Operating; formerly: Yorktown Clipper	
Spirit of '98	Cruise West			Operating	
Star Breeze	Windstar Cruises	1989	9,975	Operating. Formerly: Seabourn Spirit	
Star Clipper	Star Clippers	1992	2,298	Operating	
Star Flyer	Star Clippers	1991	2,298	Operating	
Star Legend	Windstar Cruises	1990	9,975	Operating. Formerly: Seabourn Legend 1996, Queen Odyssey 1995, Royal Viking Queen 1992	
Star of Venice	American Star Line	1953	6,669	Sold for scrap in 2001; formerly Amalfi 1989, Betsy Ross 1987, Albatross 1985, Alegro 1984, Albatross 1981, Najla 1979, built as Leda	
Star of the Seas	Royal Caribbean International	2025	248,663	Operating	
Star Pisces	StarCruises	1993	40,053	Scrapped in 2022 in Alang. Formerly: Kalypso.	
Star Pride	Windstar Cruises	1988	9,975	Operating. Formerly: Seabourn Pride	
Star Voyager	StarCruises	1997	77,441	Operating. Formerly Dawn Princess, and Pacific Explorer	
Stella Polaris	Bergen Line - Sweden	1927	5,020	1927–1940: Cruising; 1940–1945: German Army; 1945: Bergen Line + rebuilt; 1952: Clipper Line - Sweden + rebuilt; rebuilt in 1954, 1965 and 1968; 1969: International House Co. - Japan Floating hotel in Kisho Nishiura (Japan) under the name "Stella Polaris – Floating Restaurant Scandinavia". 2005: Petro Fast AB - Sweden. End of August 2006: leaves under tow her berth for the first time in 30 years for refitting and voyage to Europe. Sept. 2, 2005: Sunk while under tow in southeastern Japanese waters in 70 meters deep water. Unconfirmed plans to raise her from the ocean floor or to rebuild this iconic cruise ship.	
Stella Solaris	Royal Olympic Cruises	1953	10,595	Formerly: Cambodge; rebuilt 1971–1973; scrapped 2003	
Sun Princess	Princess Cruises	1995	77,441	Operating	
Sun Vista	Sun Cruises	1963	30,440	Formerly: Meridian, Galileo, built as ocean liner SS Galileo Galilei. Sank 1999.	
SuperStar Aquarius	Star Cruises	1993	51,309	Scrapped at Alang, formerly: Windward and Norwegian Wind.	
SuperStar Gemini	Star Cruises	1992	50,764	Scrapped at Alang. Formerly: Norwegian Dream and Dreamward.	
SuperStar Libra	Star Cruises	1988	42,275	Scrapped in 2022. Formerly a hotel ship for MV Werften employees	
Svea Corona	Rederi AB Svea / Silja Line	1975	13,257	Ended service in 1984. Later Sundancer, Pegasus. Scrapped 1995.	
Symphony of the Seas	Royal Caribbean International	2018	228,081	Operating	Symphony of the Seas at Miami
Taras Shevchenko	Black Sea Shipping Company	1966	19,549	Scrapped 2005	
The World	ResidenSea	2002	53,524	Operating	
Thomson Majesty	Louis Cruise Lines / Thomson Cruises	1997	48,876	Operating. Formerly: Royal Majesty, Norwegian Majesty, Louis Majesty	
Topaz	Peace Boat	1955		Scrapped in 2003.	
Turama	Sete Yacht Management	1990	8,343	Operating. Formerly: Delfin Caravelle, Sally Caravelle, Columbus Caravelle	
Uganda	British-India Steam Navigation Company	1952	17,000	Began life as an ocean liner, served as a hospital ship in the Falklands War. Sold for scrap in 1986.	
Utopia of the Seas	Royal Caribbean International	2024	236,473	Operating	
Variety Voyager	AdventureSmith Explorations	2012	1,593	Originally, the Harmony A (IMO 9657090)	
Vasco da Gama	Nicko Cruises	1994	55,451	Formerly Statendam for Holland America Line, then transferred November 2015 to P&O Cruises Australia as Pacific Eden March 2019 Transferred to Cruise & Maritime Voyages as Vasco da Gama	Vasco da Gama in Liverpool
Ventura	P&O Cruises	2008	116,017	Operating	Ventura
Vidanta Elegant	Vidanta Cruises	1990	15,396	Formerly: Voyager, Crown Monarch, Cunard Crown Monarch, Nautican , Walrus, Havens Star, Neptune, Rembrandt II, Jules Verne, Alexander Von Humboldt II	
Viking Jupiter	Viking Cruises	2019	47,842	Operating	Viking Jupiter
Viking Mars	Viking Cruises	2022	47,842	Operating	Viking Mars
Viking Octantis	Viking Cruises	2022	30,150	Operating	ship
Viking Orion	Viking Cruises	2018	47,842	Operating	Viking Orion
Viking Polaris	Viking Cruises	2022	30,150	Operating	
Viking Saturn	Viking Cruises	2023	47,842	Operating	
Viking Sea	Viking Cruises	2016	47,842	Operating	Viking Sea
Viking Sky	Viking Cruises	2017	47,800	Operating	Viking Sky
Viking Star	Viking Cruises	2015	47,842	Operating	Viking Star
Viking Vela	Viking Cruises	2024	47,842	Operating	
Viking Venus	Viking Cruises	2021	47,842	Operating	Viking Venus
Villa Vie Odyssey	Villa Vie Residences	1993	19,089	Operating. Formerly: Braemar, Crown Dynasty, Norwegian Dynasty, Crown Majesty, Cunard Crown Majesty.	
Vision of the Seas	Royal Caribbean International	1998	78,340	Operating	Vision of the Seas
Vista	Oceania Cruises	2023	67,817	Operating	MS Oceania
Volendam	Holland America Line	1999	60,906	Operating	Volendam
Voyager of the Seas	Royal Caribbean International	1999	138,194	Operating	Voyager of the Seas
Westerdam	Holland America Line	2004	81,811	Operating	Westerdam
Wind Song	Windstar Cruises	1987	5,350	Devastated by fire in 2002 and scuttled in January 2003	Wind Song
Wind Spirit	Windstar Cruises	1988	5,350	Operating	Wind Spirit
Wind Star	Windstar Cruises	1986	5,350	Operating	Wind Star
Wind Surf	Windstar Cruises	1998	14,745	Operating; formerly: Club Med I	MS Windsurf
Wonder of the Seas	Royal Caribbean International	2022	236,857	Operating	Wonder of the Seas in Saint-Nazaire, 2021
World Discoverer	Adventurer Cruises	1975	3,724	Wrecked April 30, 2000	World Discoverer in Salaverry, 1993
World Explorer	Nicko Cruises	2018	9,300	Operating	
World Odyssey	Semester at Sea	1998	22,400	Operating since August 2015; formerly: Deutschland 1998	
World Voyager	Nicko Cruises	2020	9,300	Operating	
Xpedition	Celebrity Cruises	2004	2,842	Operating; formerly Sun Bay I	
Yamal	Poseidon Arctic Voyages	1992	23,445	Operating	
Yankee Clipper	Windjammer Barefoot Cruises	1965	327	Operating	
Yorktown	Cruise West	1988	2,354	Operating	
Zaandam	Holland America Line	2000	60,906	Operating	Zaandam
Zenith	Pullmantur Cruises	1992	47,255	Scrapped in 2022. Transferred from Pullmantur Cruises to CDF Croisières de France in 2014	center\Zenith
Zhao Shang Yi Dun	China Merchants Viking Cruises	2017	47,842	Operating. Formerly Viking Sun	Viking Sun off Tallinn, 2018
Zuiderdam	Holland America Line	2002	81,679	Operating	MS Zuiderdam00066

== Classes of cruise ships ==
Cruise ship classes are sets of ships that have similar tonnage, height, length, passenger capacity and accommodation.

- Belorussiya-class cruiseferry
- Breakaway-class cruise ship
- Concordia-class cruise ship
- Conquest-class cruise ship
- Destiny-class cruise ship
- Dream-class cruise ship
- Edge-class cruise ship
- Excellence-class cruise ship
- Fantasy-class cruise ship
- Freedom-class cruise ship
- Global-class
- Grand-class cruise ship
- Holiday-class cruise ship
- Icon-class cruise ship
- Jewel-class cruise ship
- Millennium-class cruise ship
- Fantasia-class cruise ship
- Lirica class
- Oasis-class cruise ship
- Project America
- Project Icon cruise ship
- Project Leonardo
- Quantum-class cruise ship
- Radiance-class cruise ship
- Regatta-class cruise ship
- Royal-class cruise ship
- Seaside class cruise ship
- Solstice-class cruise ship
- Sovereign-class cruise ship
- Spirit-class cruise ship
- Sun-class cruise ship
- Vision-class cruise ship
- Vista Spirit hybrid class cruise ship
- Vista-class cruise ship
- Vista-class cruise ship (Carnival)
- Voyager-class cruise ship

== See also ==
- List of cruise lines
- List of largest cruise lines
- List of largest cruise ships
- List of largest passenger ships
- List of river cruise ships
