= List of existing 20th century cruise ships and liners =

List of surviving cruise ships and liners built in the 20th century. Chronological by decade the ship was built:

== 1900s ==
Name	Image	Entered service	In service	Status	Notes
Keewatin		1907	1907–1965	Museum ship in Kingston, Ontario	

== 1910s ==
Name	Image	Entered service	In service	Status	Notes
Doulos Phos		1914	1914–2009	Hotel in Bintan, Indonesia	Built as Medina for the Mallory Steamship Company

== 1930s ==
Ship	Image	Entered service	In service	Status	Notes
Hikawa Maru		1930	1930–1960	Museum in Naka-ku, Yokohama, Japan	
Le Lydia		1931	1931-1966	Museum in Le Barcarès, France	Built as Moonta for Adelaide Steamship Co Ltd
Sea Cloud		1931	1931–present	In service for Sea Cloud Cruises	Built as Hussar V for Marjorie Merriweather Post
Queen Mary		1936	1936–1967	Museum and hotel in Long Beach, California	Blue Riband and Hales Trophy holder from 1938 to 1952

== 1940s ==
Name	Image	Entered service	In service	Status	Notes
Sunnhordland		1943	1943–present	In service	Built as the US Naval patrol craft USS PCE-830

== 1950s ==
Ship	Image	Entered service	In service	Status	Notes
Baltic Star		1953	1953–2020	Laid up	
Nordstjernen		1956	1956–present	In service for Vestland Classic	
Rotterdam		1959	1959–2000	Hotel and museum in Rotterdam, Netherlands	

== 1960s ==
Ship	Image	Entered service	In service	Status	Notes
Bore		1960	1960–2010	Hotel in Turku, Finland	
Serenissima		1960	1960–present	In service	
Funchal		1961	1961–2011	Due to be scrapped in Aliağa, Turkey	
Minghua		1962	1962–1983	Hotel and entertainment complex in Shenzhen, China	Built as Ancerville for Compagnie de Navigation Paquet
Savannah		1962	1962–1972	Museum in Baltimore, Maryland	
Galapagos Legend		1963	1963–present	In service for GO Galapagos Ecuador	Built as Helgoland for HADAG
Lofoten		1964	1964–2021	In service as a training ship	
Hebridean Princess		1965	1965–present	In service	Built as the car ferry Columba for David MacBrayne LTD
Alexander		1966	1966–present	In service for the House of Al Saud	
Ocean Majesty		1966	1966–present	In service for Majestic International Cruises	Built as Juan March for Trasmediterránea
Freewinds		1968	1968–present	In service for San Donato Properties Corporation	Built as Boheme for Wallenius Bremen
Queen Elizabeth 2		1969	1969–2008	Hotel in Dubai, United Arab Emirates	

== 1970s ==
Ship	Image	Entered service	In service	Status	Notes
Monet		1970	1970–present	In service for Noble Caledonia	
MS Knyaz Vladimir		1971	1971–present	In service for Black Sea Cruises	Built as Eagle for Southern Ferries
Vestland Adventurer		1972	1972–present	In service for Vestland Classic	
Aegean Odyssey		1973	1973–present	Laid up for sale in Piraeus, Greece	Built as Narcis for Zim Navigation
Rex Fortune		1974	1974–2004	Hotel in Sihanoukville, Cambodia	Built as Royal Odyssey for Royal Cruise Line
Expedition		1975	1975–present	In service for Sunstone Ships	Built as Alla Tarasova for Murmansk Shipping Company
Klavdiya Yelanskaya		1977	1977–present	In service	

== 1980s ==
Ship	Image	Entered service	In service	Status	Notes
Berlin Oceanis		1980	1980–present	In service	
Blue Sapphire		1981	1981–present	In service for ANEX Tour	Built as Europa for Hapag-Lloyd
Ocean Endeavour		1982	1982–present	In service for Kristina Cruises	Built as Konstantin Simonov for the Soviet Union
National Geographic Explorer		1982	1982–present	In service for Lindblad Expeditions	Built as Midnatsol
Artania		1984	1984–present	In service for Phoenix Reisen	Built as Royal Princess for Princess Cruises
SeaDream I		1984	1984–present	In service for SeaDream Yacht Club	
SeaDream II		1985	1985–present	In service for SeaDream Yacht Club	
Wind Star		1986	1986–present	In service	
Amera		1988	1988–present	In service for Phoenix Reisen	Built as Royal Viking Sun for Royal Viking Line
Balmoral		1988	1988–present	In service for Fred Olsen Cruises	Built as Crown Odyssey for Royal Cruise Line
Star Pride		1988	1988–present	In service for Windstar Cruises	Built as Seabourn Pride for Seabourn Cruises Line
Wind Spirit		1988	1988–present	In service	
Star Breeze		1989	1989–present	In service for Windstar Cruises	Built as Seabourn Spirit for Seabourn Cruises Line
Exploris One		1989	1989–present	In service	
La Belle Des Oceans		1989	1989–present	In service	
Dubawi		1989	1989–present	In service as a yacht	

== 1990s ==
Ship	Image	Entered service	In service	Status	Notes
Seaventure		1990	1990–present	Chartered to Havila Kystruten	Built as Frontier Spirit for Hapag-Lloyd
Aegean Paradise		1990	1990–present	In service for New Century Cruise Line	Built as Orient Venus for Japan Cruise Line
Corinthian		1990	1990–present	In service for Grand Circle Cruise Line	Built as Renaissance Four for Renaissance Cruise Line
Mantra		1990	1990–2021	Laid up	
VidantaWorld Elegant		1990	1990–2018	In service for VidantaWorld	Built as Crown Monarch for Crown Cruise Line
Empress		1990	1990–present	In service for Cordelia Cruises	Built as Nordic Empress for Royal Caribbean Line
Asuka II		1990	1990–present	In service for Nippon Yusen Kaisha	Built as Crystal Harmony for Crystal Cruises
Wind Surf		1990	1990–present	In service	
Caledonian Sky		1991	1991–present	In service for Noble Caledonia	
Hebridean Sky		1991	1991–present	In service for Noble Caledonia	
Sea Spirit		1991	1991–present	In service for Poseidon Expeditions	
Heritage Adventurer		1991	1991–present	In service for Heritage Expeditions	Ordered as Society Adventurer for Discoverer Reederei
Amadea		1991	1991–present	In service for Phoenix Reisen	Built as Asuka for Nippon Yusen Kaisha
Margaritaville at Sea Paradise		1991	1991–present	In service for Margaritaville at Sea	Built as Costa Classica for Costa Cruises
Island Sky		1992	1992–present	In service for Noble Caledonia	
Star Legend		1992	1992–present	In service for Windstar Cruises	Built as Royal Viking Queen for Royal Viking Line
Ambience		1992	1992–present	In service for Ambassador Cruise Line	Built as Regal Princess for Princess Cruises
Majesty of the Oceans		1992	1992–2020	Laid up by Seajets in Piraeus, Greece	Built as Majesty of the Seas for Royal Caribbean Line
Gemini		1992	1992–present	In service for Miray Cruises	Built as Crown Jewel for Crown Cruise Line
Crown Iris		1992	1992–present	In service for Mano Maritime	Built as Royal Majesty for Majesty Cruises
Villa Vie Odyssey		1993	1993-2020; 2024–present	In service for Villa Vie Residences	Built as Crown Dynasty for Crown Cruise Line
Vasco da Gama		1993	1993–present	In service for Nicko Cruises	Built as Statendam for Holland America Line
Renaissance		1993	1993-2020; 2023–present	In service Compagnie Française de Croisières	Built as Maasdam for Holland America Line
Silver Cloud		1994	1994–present	In service for Silversea Cruises	
Celestyal Journey		1994	1994-2020; 2023–present	In service for Celestyal Cruises	Built as Ryndam for Holland America Line
Silver Wind		1995	1995–present	In service for Silversea Cruises	
Crystal Symphony		1995	1995–2022	In service	
Marella Discovery 2		1995	1995–present	In service for Marella Cruises	Built as Legend of the Seas for Royal Caribbean Cruise Line
Marella Explorer 2		1995	1995–present	In service for Marella Cruises	Built as Century for Celebrity Cruises
Piano Land		1995	1995-2020; 2024–present	In service for Astro Ocean Cruises	Built as Oriana for P&O Cruises
Pacific World		1995	1995–present	In service for Peace Boat	Built as Sun Princess for Princess Cruises
Minerva		1996	1996-2017	Laid up for sale in Elefsis, Greece	Ordered as Okean for the Soviet Union
Aegean Majesty		1996	1996-2020	Laid up by Seajets in Aigio, Greece	Built as Veendam for Holland America Line
Astoria Grande		1996	1996–present	In service for Miray Cruises	Built as AIDAcara for Aida Cruises
Marella Discovery		1996	1996– present	In service for Marella Cruises	Built as Splendor of the Seas for Royal Caribbean Cruise Line
Marella Explorer		1996	1996– present	In service for Marella Cruises	Built as Galaxy for Celebrity Cruises
Carnival Sunshine		1996	1996– present	In service	
Club Med 2		1996	1996–present	In service	
Grandeur of the Seas		1996	1996– present	In service	
Hamburg		1997	1997–present	In service for Plantours & Partner GmbH	Built as Columbus for Hapag-Lloyd
Marella Voyager		1997	1997–present	In service for Marella Cruises	Built as Mercury for Celebrity Cruises
Rhapsody of the Seas		1997	1997–present	In service	
Enchantment of the Seas		1997	1997–present	In service	
Star Voyager		1997	1997–present	In service for Star Cruises	Built as Dawn Princess for Princess Cruises
Borealis		1997	1997–present	In service for Fred Olsen Cruises	Built as Rotterdam for Holland America Line
Paul Gauguin		1997	1997–present	In service for Paul Gauguin Cruises	
Eastern Venus		1998	1998-2023; 2024–present	In service for DuWon Shipping	Built as Pacific Venus for Shin Nihonkai Ferry
Deutschland		1998	1998–present	In service for Phoenix Reisen and Semester at Sea	
Clio		1998	1998–present	In service for GCCL Cayman Fleet 1	
Vision of the Seas		1998	1998–present	In service	
Grand Princess		1998	1998–present	In service	
Carnival Elation		1998	1998–present	In service	
Dream		1998	1998–present	In service for Tianjin Orient	Built as Sea Princess for Princess Cruises
Carnival Paradise		1998	1998–present	In service	
Insignia		1998	1998–present	In service	Built as R One for Renaissance Cruises
Regatta		1998	1998–present	In service	Built as R Two for Renaissance Cruises
Disney Magic		1998	1998–present	In service	
Seven Seas Navigator		1999	1999–present	In service	Ordered as Akademik Nikolay Pilyugin for the Soviet Union
Azamara Onward		1999	1999–present	In service	Built as R Three for Renaissance Cruises
Sirena		1999	1999–present	In service	Built as R Four for Renaissance Cruises
Norwegian Sky		1999	1999–present	In service	Ordered as Costa Olympia for Costa Cruises
Sea Cloud II		1999	1999–present	In service	
Disney Wonder		1999	1999–present	In service	
Carnival Sunrise		1999	1999–present	In service	
Ambition		1999	1999–2020	In service for Ambassador Cruise Line	Built as Mistral for Festival Cruises
Europa		1999	1999–present	In service	
Voyager of the Seas		1999	1999–present	In service	
Volendam		1999	1999–present	In service	
