= The Majestic Line =

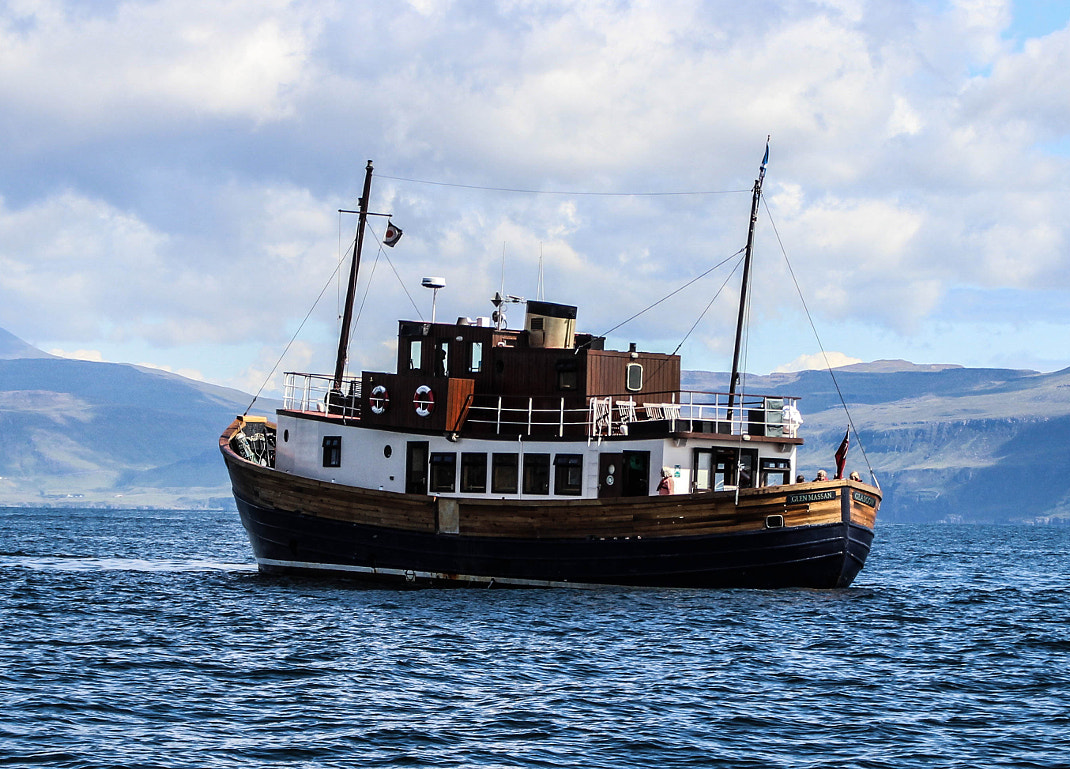
- Majestic Line ship MV Glen Massan off Iona
- Type: Private
- Industry: Transport
- Founded: 2004
- Founders: Ken Grant; Andy Thoms
- Headquarters: Sandbank, Argyll and Bute, Scotland.
- Area served: Islands of the Clyde; Inner Hebrides
- Services: Cruising
- Website: The Majestic Line

The Majestic Line (Scotland) Ltd, West Coast Cruises, is a private cruise line with its headquarters in the Sandbank Marina on the Cowal Peninsula in the West of Scotland. Founded in 2004, it is named after a fictional shipping company that featured in Neil Munro's Tales of Para Handy.

As of 2019, the line operates cruises from Oban to the Outer Hebrides, North West Coast Mainland, through the heart of Scotland via the Caledonian Canal, the Island of Mull, the Isle of Skye and the Small Isles, Islands of the Clyde (Firth of Clyde) and the Inner Hebrides.

== Fleet ==
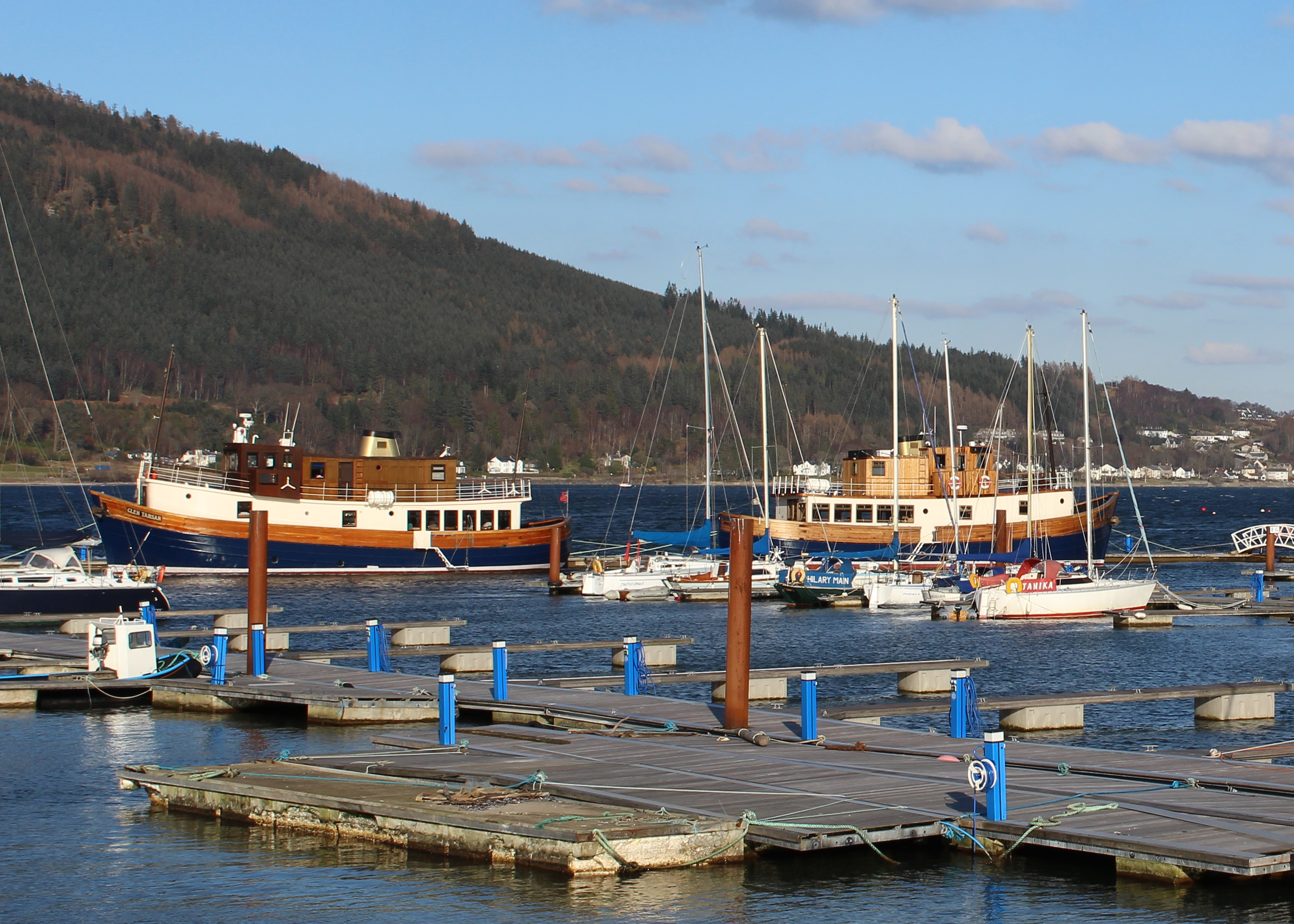
Majestic Line ships at Holy Loch Marina, Sandbank

The company runs a fleet of four vessels, Glen Massan and Glen Tarsan are converted fishing trawlers, Glen Etive and Glen Shiel are purpose-built vessels designed to resemble a 1930s "gentleman’s motor yacht".

Name	Crew	Passengers	Type	Built	Notes
MV Glen Massan	4	11	Cruise ship	Ireland	Entered cruise ship service in 2006.
MV Glen Tarsan	4	11	Cruise ship	Ireland	Entered cruise ship service in 2007.
MV Glen Etive	4	12	Cruise ship	Isle of Bute, Scotland	Entered service in 2016.
MV Glen Shiel	4	12	Cruise ship	Isle of Bute, Scotland	Entered service in 2019.

== See also ==
- Cruising (maritime)
- List of cruise lines
