= The Ritz-Carlton Yacht Collection =

Luxury cruise line

- Type: Privately held company
- Industry: Tourism
- Founded: 2017; 9 years ago
- Founder: Douglas Prothero
- Headquarters: Fort Lauderdale, Florida, U.S.
- Area served: Worldwide
- Key people: Ernesto Fara (President and CEO); Jim Murren (Executive Chairman)
- Products: Cruises
- Owner: Oaktree Capital Management (55%); Mohari Hospitality (30%); Government of Singapore (15%)
- Website: ritzcarltonyachtcollection.com

The Ritz-Carlton Yacht Collection is a luxury cruise line headquartered in Fort Lauderdale, Florida, United States. The company was announced in June 2017 and operates three vessels that it markets as superyachts.

Although the vessels carry the branding of The Ritz-Carlton Hotel Company, a subsidiary of Marriott International, the cruise line is a separate business. It is operated by Cruise Yacht OpCo Ltd, which is majority owned by the private equity firm Oaktree Capital Management. The Ritz-Carlton supplies hospitality services under a long-term operating agreement.

== History ==
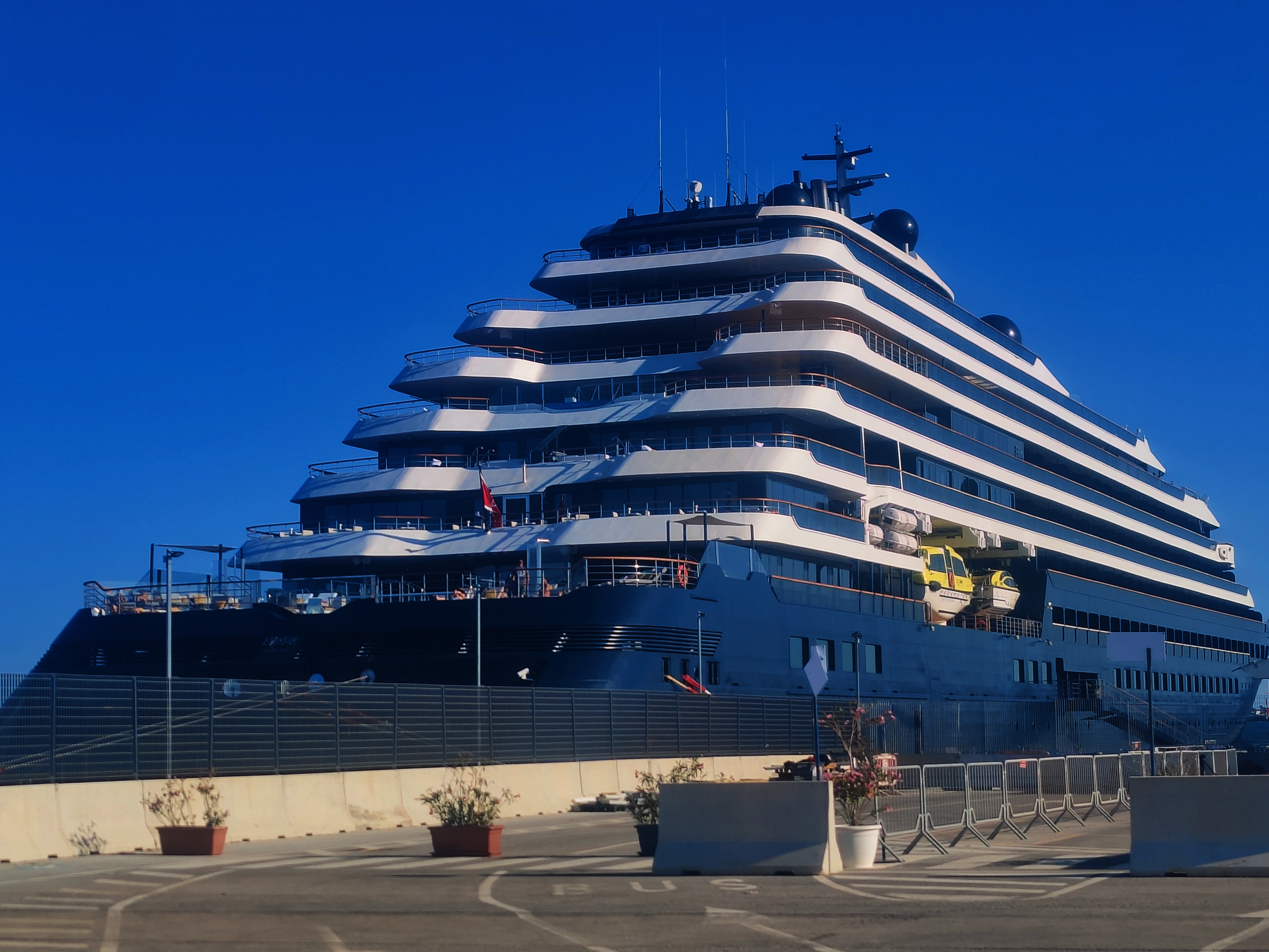
Evrima, the company's first vessel, entered service in October 2022 after more than three years of delays.

=== Founding ===
The Ritz-Carlton announced its entry into the cruise industry on 22 June 2017. The idea was developed by Canadian maritime executive Douglas Prothero with funds managed by Oaktree Capital Management. The initial plan called for three luxury vessels, the first of which was expected to enter service in 2020.

Ownership of the operating company was divided between Oaktree Capital Management, which held 55 per cent, the Scheinberg family's Mohari Hospitality, which held 30 per cent, and the government of Singapore, which held the remaining 15 per cent. In November 2021 the cruise line joined Marriott Bonvoy, allowing guests to earn and redeem points from Marriott's loyalty programme on its voyages.

=== Delivery ===
The first ship, Evrima, was ordered in 2017 from Hijos de J. Barreras of Vigo, Spain. It was a yard experienced in building passenger ferries and container ships, but it had never built a cruise ship. Construction fell behind schedule, and the yard entered financial difficulty, ultimately collapsing. The incomplete hull was towed to a second Spanish facility, Astander, at Santander for completion.

The debut was repeatedly postponed, first because of the shipyard's problems and later because of the COVID-19 pandemic. Evrima eventually had her maiden voyage in October 2022, more than three years behind the original schedule. The ship was christened at Lisbon the following month.

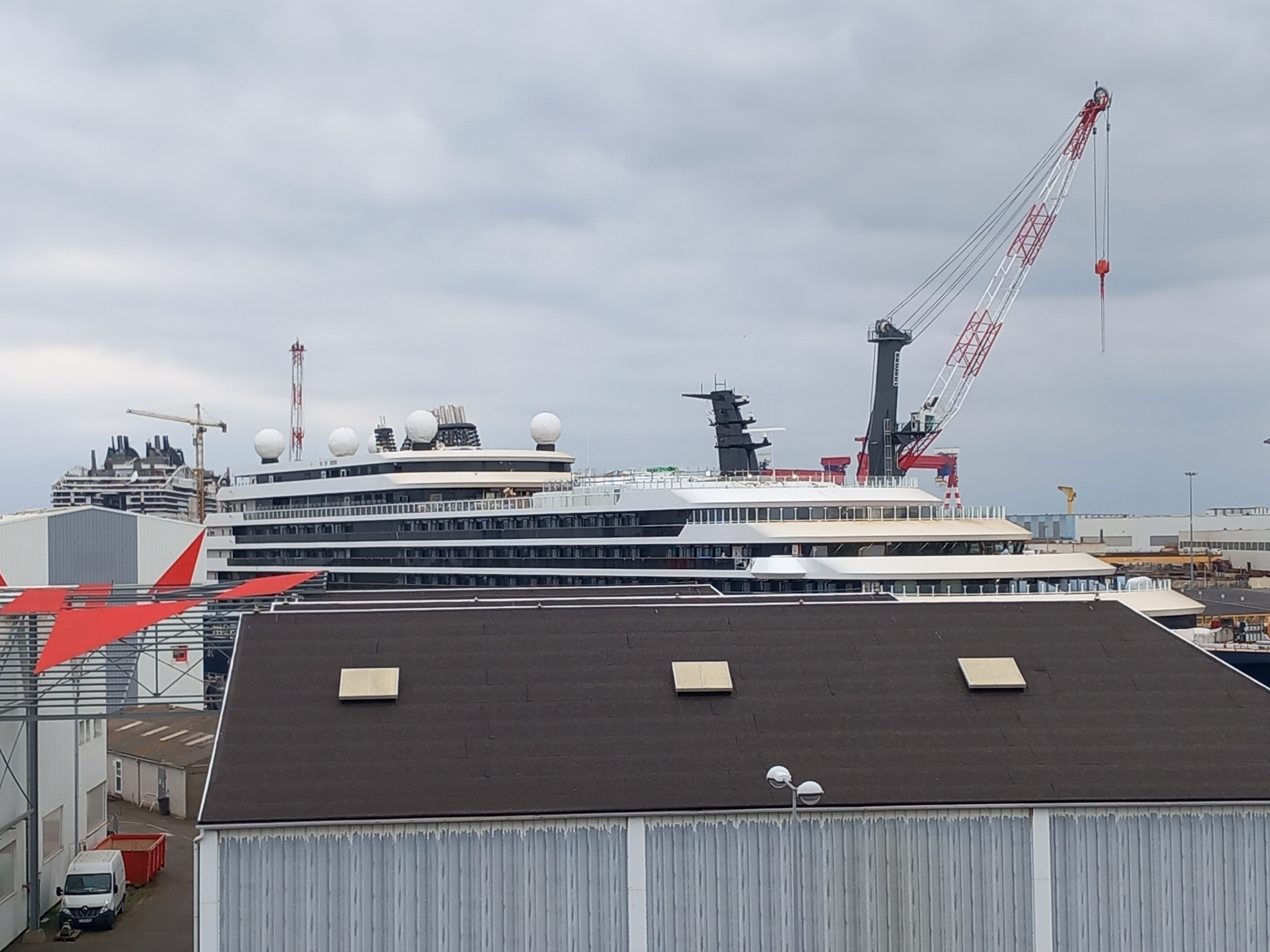
Ilma at Saint-Nazaire, where she and sister ship Luminara were built

Plans for sister ships at the original Spanish yard were abandoned. In March 2022 the company placed an order with Chantiers de l'Atlantique at Saint-Nazaire, France, for two larger LNG-powered vessels for delivery in 2024 and 2025.

Ilma was delivered in July 2024 and began her maiden voyage from Monte Carlo to Civitavecchia on 2 September 2024. She was christened at Port Everglades in December 2024.

The third vessel, Luminara, was handed over at Saint-Nazaire on 3 June 2025 and entered service the following month. She was named at Barcelona.

=== Deployment ===
The line initially sailed in the Mediterranean, the Caribbean and Northern Europe, with winter Caribbean seasons operating from homeports including San Juan, Puerto Rico, and Fort Lauderdale. Luminara provided the company's first Asia-Pacific season in December 2025, also operating the company's first Alaska season in the summer of 2026.

== Onboard experience ==
Accommodation on all three vessels is provided exclusively in suites, each with a private terrace. Evrima has 149 suites for up to 298 guests, while Ilma and Luminara each have around 224 suites for up to roughly 450 guests. Reported crew-to-guest ratios are close to 1:1, higher than on mainstream cruise lines.

Each vessel has multiple dining venues in addition to 24-hour in-suite dining, and each ship includes a fold-out marina platform used for swimming and watersports. Fares are marketed as all-inclusive, covering dining, beverages and gratuities. Rather than fixed daily schedules typical of larger cruise ships, itineraries are built around smaller ports and boroughs that bigger vessels usually cannot access.

== Leadership ==
Chief executive	Years	Ships introduced
Douglas Prothero	2017–2023	Evrima
Jim Murren	2023–2025	Ilma, Luminara
Ernesto Fara	2025–present	

== Finances ==
In June 2026 the Financial Times reported that the company had accumulated net losses of nearly $700 million since its founding, and that it had borrowed more than $1.5 billion to fund the construction of its three ships and operations.

As part of a refinancing agreed with its lenders, Crédit Agricole, which held more than $900 million of the debt, delayed $171 million of repayments on the loans that financed Ilma and Luminara, extending one facility from December 2025 to January 2028 and another from December 2027 to January 2033. A syndicate led by Spain's CaixaBank waived its right to call in $299 million secured against Evrima. In exchange, the controlling shareholders committed a further $275 million of equity, bringing their total investment to more than $1 billion. The company indicated that further covenant waivers were likely to be needed during 2026.

Reporting on the refinancing linked the losses to low occupancy. The company worked to convert Ritz-Carlton hotel guests into cruise passengers, and to compete with the new luxury cruise divisions of Four Seasons, Orient Express and Aman.

== Fleet ==
The company operates three vessels, all of which are registered in Malta. Evrima measures 190 m (620 ft) in length. Ilma and Luminara are sister ships of about 241 m (791 ft) and are the first in the fleet to be powered by LNG.

=== Current fleet ===
Ship	Image	Built	Builder	In service for the company	Passengers	Gross tonnage	Flag	Notes
Evrima		2022	Hijos de J. Barreras (completed at Astander)	2022–present	298	25,400	Malta	First vessel built for the company; delivered more than three years late following the collapse of the building yard
Ilma		2024	Chantiers de l'Atlantique	2024–present	448	46,750	Malta	First LNG-powered vessel in the fleet; 224 suites
Luminara		2025	Chantiers de l'Atlantique	2025–present	452	46,750	Malta	Sister ship to Ilma; 226 suites

== See also ==
- Explora Journeys
- Seabourn Cruise Line
- Silversea
