= MS Polaris =

Russian-owned passenger ship built in Denmark in 1968

History
- Name: Disko (1968–2000); Shearwater (2000–2001); Brand Polaris (2001–2003); Viking Polaris (2003–2005); Polaris (2005–2019)
- Owner: 1968–1987: Northsea S; 1987–1993: Carrier Vesterhavet IS & A / N Petersen A / S; 1993–1996: Royal Arctic Line A / S; 1996–1997: KNI-Service A / S; 1997–2000: Greenland Tourism; 2000–2001: Scandinavian Cruise Line; 2001–2001: Viking Polaris; 2000–2001: Gallion Shipping; 2001–2004: Viking Polaris; 2004–2004: Silvero Shipping; 2005–2013: Murmansk Shipping; 2013–2019: Russia Government Sakhalin Region
- Operator: 1968–1993: The Royal Greenland Trading Department; 1993–1996: Royal Arctic Line; 1993–1996: KNI-Service; 1996–2000: Greenland Tourism; 2000–2000: Dala Rederi; 2000–2001: Betz eft.; 2001–2003: Viking Polaris; 2003–2003: Sophlex Ship Management; 2003–2004: Swedish Adventure Cruises; 2004–2004: J. Gran & Co. A/S Shipbrokers; 2004–2004: NB Maritime Management Cyprus; 2005–2013: Murmansk Shipping; 2013–2019: Sakhalin-Kurily JSC
- Port of registry: 1968–1987: Copenhagen, Denmark; 1987–1993: Aalborg, Denmark; 1993–1996: Mantiitsoq, Greenland; 1996–1999: Aalborg, Denmark; 1999–2000: Nakskov, Denmark; 2000–2004: Nassau, Bahamas; 2004–2004: Kingstown, Saint Vincent and the Grenadines; 2005–2013: Murmansk, Russia; 2013–2019: Korsakov, Russia
- Ordered: Northsea S
- Builder: Svendborg Skibsværft
- Yard number: 122
- Completed: 16 April 1968
- Identification: Call sign: UBDF; IMO number: 6807395; MMSI number: 273430670
- Fate: Scrapped in Busan, South Korea 2019

General characteristics
- Type: Cruise ship
- Tonnage: 2,097 GT; 556 DWT and 445 DWT
- Displacement: 2,178 tons
- Length: 70.56 m (231 ft 6 in)
- Beam: 13.54 m (44 ft 5 in)
- Draught: 4.4 m (14 ft 5 in)
- Depth: 8.0 m (26 ft 3 in)
- Decks: 5
- Propulsion: 1968–2000, two 9-cylinder MAN diesel engine after 2000, 1 Scania DSI 14 61 M4OD diesel engine
- Speed: in 1968–2000 13.0 knots (24.1 km/h) after 2000, 11.3 knots (20.9 km/h)
- Capacity: in 1968–2000 201 passengers, after 2000 80 passengers
- Crew: 36

MS Polaris was a Russian-owned, Danish-built passenger ship in service with the Murmansk Shipping Company and based in Murmansk. It was built in 1968, and until 2000, it served as a ferry between cities in Greenland, mainly passenger transfers along the Greenland coastline. In 2000 she was bought by Scandinavian Cruise Line and was refurbished in Denmark by Master Mariner AB, Sweden. She was named M/S Shearwaterto and changed to Bahamian flag. She was sold to Norway 2001. It moved to Russia in 2005

It holds 80 passengers and is equipped with a lounge with bar, as well as a library, covered deck, outside deck and a gift shop. It was renovated at Tallinn, Estonia in 2005 and offered cruises in the Barents Sea and transfers from Murmansk to Saint Petersburg, Arkhangelsk, the Solovets Islands and was also the only ship that stops at Vaygach Island.

It was surveyed in Murmansk on 27 February 2010 and found to be in good condition.
