= MS Lofoten =

Ship built in 1964

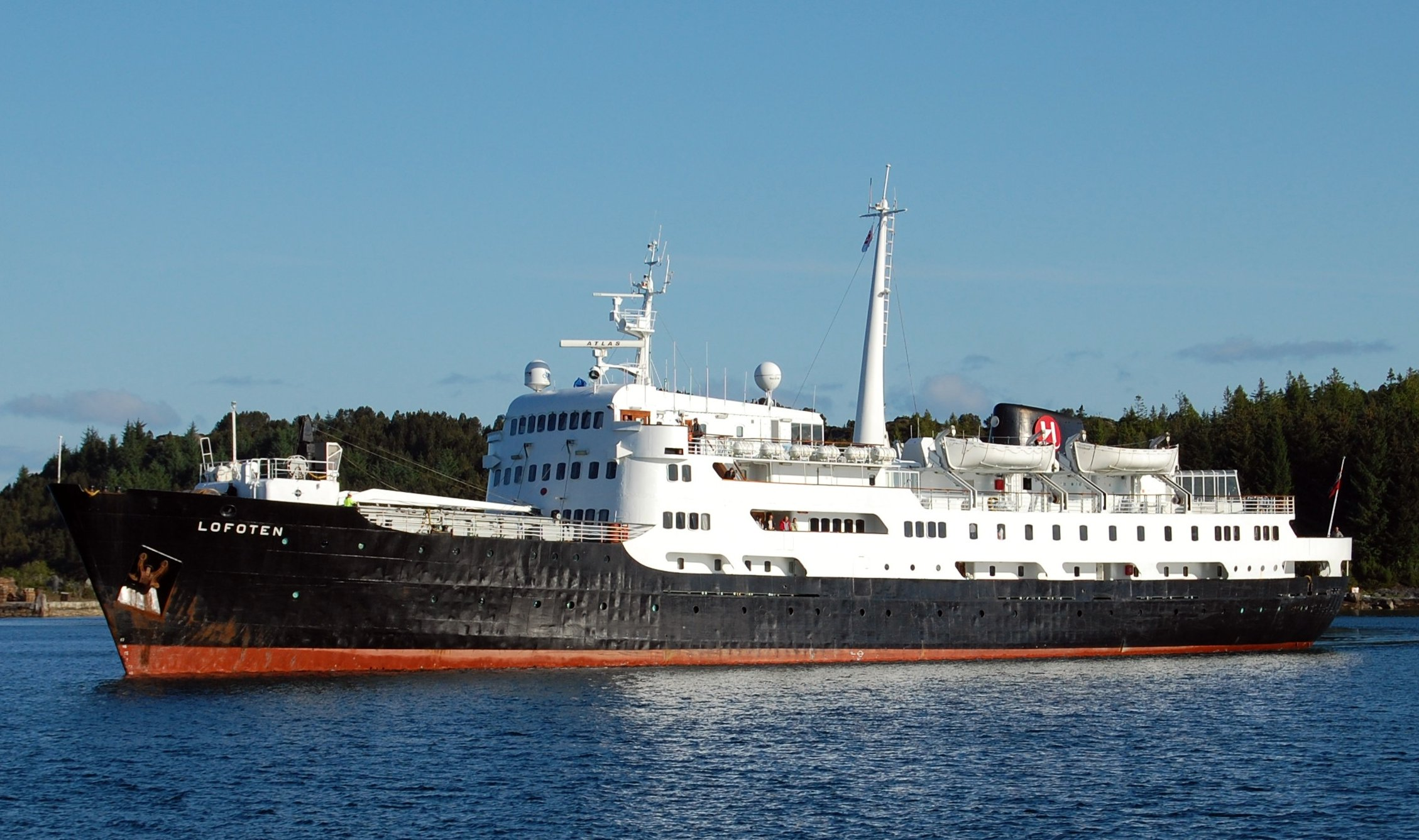
- MS Lofoten

History
- Name: MS Lofoten
- Owner: 1964-1988 Vesteraalens Dampskibsselskab; 1988 Ofotens og Vesteraalens Dampskibsselskap; 1988-1996 Finnmark Fylkesrederi & Ruteselskap; 1996-2006 Ofotens og Vesteraalens Dampskibsselskap; 2006- 2021 Hurtigruten; 2021 - –––– Maritim videregående skole Sørlandet
- Operator: Maritim videregående skole Sørlandet, Kristiansand
- Port of registry: Stokmarknes; Narvik; Hammerfest; Narvik; Tromsø; Kristiansand
- Route: Norway
- Builder: Oslo
- Cost: 17,000,000 kroner
- Yard number: 547
- Launched: 27 February 1963
- Acquired: 27 February 1964
- Maiden voyage: 27 February 1964
- In service: 1964
- Out of service: 2021
- Identification: IMO number: 5424562
- Status: Training ship

General characteristics
- Tonnage: 2,621 GT
- Length: 87.4 m (286 ft 9 in)
- Beam: 13.2 m (43 ft 4 in)
- Draught: 22 ft (6.7 m)
- Decks: 4 passenger
- Installed power: 3 325
- Propulsion: 7-cylinder two-stroke Burmeister & Wain DM742 VT2 BF90 diesel engine
- Speed: 17.5 knots (32.41 km/h; 20.14 mph)
- Capacity: 400 passengers; 149 berths; 0 cars

MS Lofoten (call sign LIXN) is a Norwegian passenger and cargo vessel formerly owned and operated by Hurtigruten. The ship was built in 1964. After Nordstjernen was retired from coastal service in 2012, Lofoten became the oldest ship in the current fleet still in operation. It operates cruises around the coast of Norway and sometimes in the Svalbard archipelago. The vessel was declared worthy of preservation in 2001 by the Norwegian Director General of Historic Monuments to preserve Norway's cultural heritage. She has been refitted several times—in 1980, 1985, 1995 and most recently in 2004.

== Construction and design ==
The ship is built in steel, except for the superstructure on the bridge deck, which is made of aluminium. It was assesed at 2,621 gross tonnage (GT), and has two cold rooms, and a total volume of cargo of 708 cubic metres (25,000 cu ft).

The main engine is a 7-cylinder two-stroke Burmeister & Wain DM742 VT2 BF90 diesel engine. The original 1963 engine is still used and the performance is 3,325 horsepower (2,479 kW), which gave a top speed of 17.5 knots (32.4 km/h; 20.1 mph) during sea trials. Originally the ship had three generators; as of 2015 two of the generators are original. In 2003, a fourth generator that acts as an emergency generator was installed.

A point of distinction of Lofoten was its old-fashioned style and construction. For example, unlike the other active ships in the Hurtigruten fleet, which use direct entry loading/offloading, Lofoten must load and unload cargo through a hatch on deck with the assistance of an on-board crane. Another period-specific difference is shared bathrooms (as opposed to in-room bathrooms). Some cabins have since been upgraded and bathrooms have been added.

Lofoten has a total of 90 cabins (currently 88), spread over 5 decks

== History ==
Many Norwegian coastal passenger and cargo ships were lost during the Second World War, which resulted in a need to rebuild the commercial fleet. Lofoten was the twelfth ship to be built during the reconstruction period after the war. The ship was christened by Asbjørg Bergsmo on 7 September 1963 and was put into the Norwegian coastal route heading northbound from Bergen on 5 March 1964.

Ownership and port of registry of the ship has changed several times in its years of service. From 1964 to 1988 the ship was owned by Vesteraalens Dampskibsselskab (VDS). Its port of registry was Stokmarknes. In January 1988 Vesteraalens Dampskibsselskab (OVDS) and Ofotens Dampskibsselskab (ODS) was merged and it created Ofotens og Vesteraalens Dampskibsselskab and port of registry was Narvik. On 30 September 1988 the ship was sold to Finnmark Fylkesrederi og Ruteselskap (FFR) for 20 million Norwegian Kroner (nok), and its port of registry was changed to Hammerfest, Norway. In 1996 the ship was sold back to Ofotens and Vesteraalens Dampskibsselskab (OVDS) and the port of registry was changed back to Narvik.

On 4 April 1966, Lofoten was in a collision with MS Storhaug. On 17 February 1968, the ship's hull was damaged at Rørvik, Norway. Between 1968 and 1982, Lofoten also travelled an express route to Svalbard. On 29 July 1972, the ship hit a sandbank just outside Longyearbyen, Svalbard. In April 1977, Lofoten made a special trip to the Shetland Islands. Later that year, on 19 July, the ship suffered large hull damage at Tjeldsund. The ship first sailed to Harstad for temporary repairs before moving on to Oslo for additional repairs. Lofoten returned to coastal service in August 1977. The ship was involved in another collision, this time with Nordnorge, on 26 January 1979. From 19 October to 5 November 1980, Lofoten was upgraded and modernized at Aalborg Værft in Denmark. The second dining room was replaced by four large cabins on the Saloon deck (cabins A2 400, 402, 404, and 406). At this time the ship transitioned from classes to no-classes. The main engine was also overhauled during the upgrade. On 21 May 1982 the vessel suffered hull damage in Kristiansund. On 21 October 1983, Lofoten lost its anchor and chain. The ship was again upgraded in October 1985 at Aalborg Værft.

On 30 May 2001, the ship was declared worthy of preservation, and on 2 February 2002, she was taken out of the coastal traffic, but was reinserted in December the same year as a replacement for Nordnorge which sailed on a cruise in Antarctica. On 6 March 2006, Lofoten suffered some bridge damage. It made another trip to the Svalbard archipelago in mid 2007. In October 2010, the ship's crane required a complete overhaul. Lofoten continued to sail without a crane until fixed.

2014 marked Lofoten's 50th anniversary and was celebrated on-board throughout the year. The same year the port of registry was changed to Tromsø. By its 50th birthday, the ship has travelled almost 3,000,000 nautical miles (5,600,000 km; 3,500,000 mi), transported 1.25 million guests, and docked over 75,000 times in Hurtigruten ports. It spent February 2015 in dry dock for maintenance and restoration. Starting in April 2015 the ship began a traditional service similar to the service style on-board during the 1960s which includes 1960s-inspired menus and retro-style uniforms. The ship got back the original VDS' chimney colors and bow rosettes, so that she appeared as when she was handed over in 1964. At 14:59 on 18 July 2015, Lofoten set a record, having been at sea for 300,000 hours. The original main engine had been in operation for 34.2 years and has operated the ship for over 4,000,000 nautical miles (7,400,000 km; 4,600,000 mi). The ship has crossed the Arctic Circle 3,000 times; 1,500 northbound and 1,500 southbound.

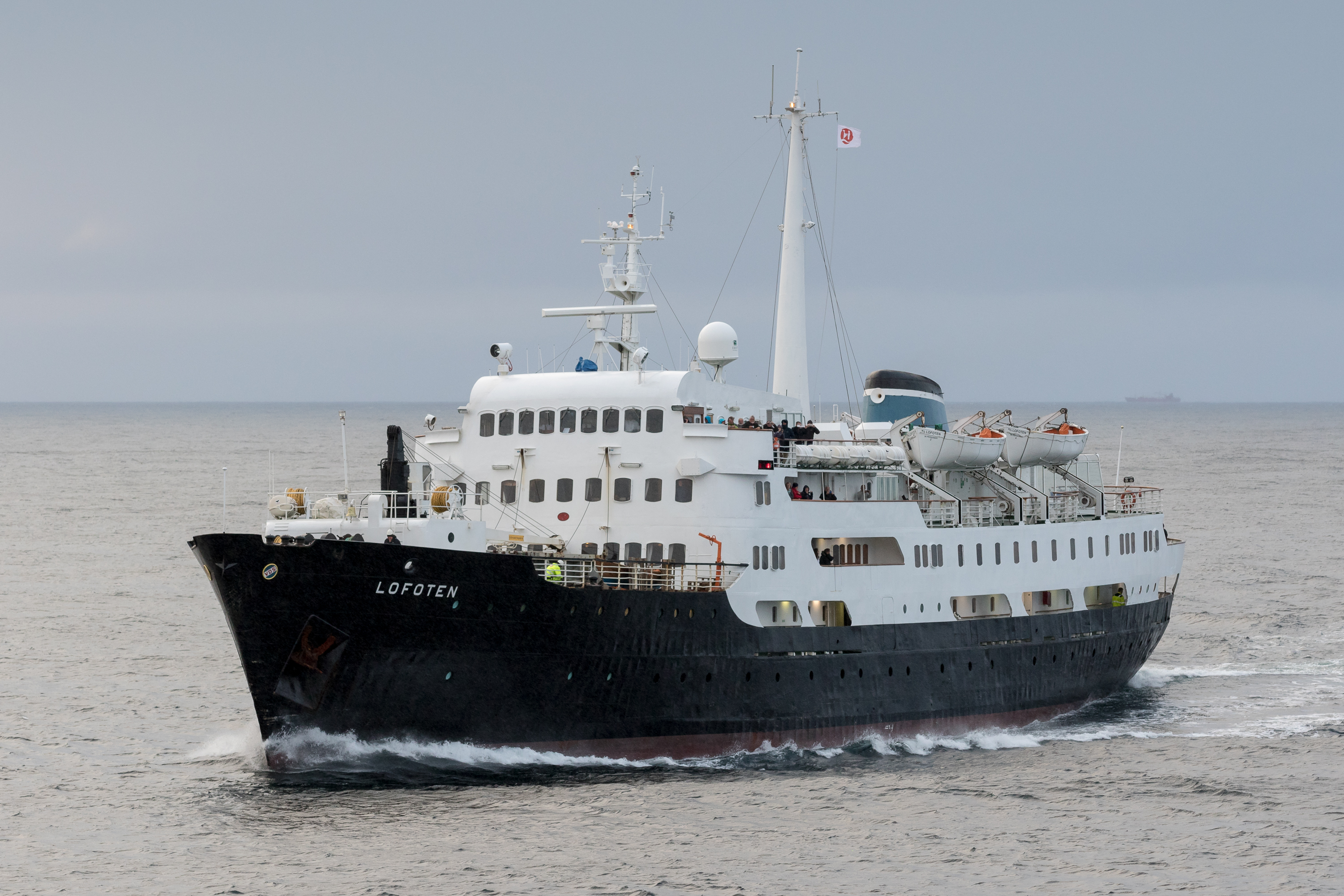
Lofoten off Berlevåg village, on Norway's northern coast

The ship, which is under the Norwegian Director General of Historic Monuments to preserve Norway's cultural heritage, corresponded i.a. in terms of accessibility no longer meets the requirements of the Norwegian state for public transport, which she was as a ship in the Hurtigruten fleet. As planned, she retired from scheduled service on 31 December 2020. Due to the effects of the COVID-19 pandemic on the utilization of the ships in 2020, the vessel was laid up in March 2020. On 1 January, the ship was sold at a price of 20 million Norwegian Kroner (nok) to Maritim videregående skole Sørlandet. The ship is in use as a training ship. It is the successor to the decommissioned training ship Sjøkurs, which is also a former Hurtigruten ship of the same generation and has since reverted to its original name, Ragnvald Jarl, after being sold to Vestland Classic.
