= MS Europa (1999) =

Cruise ship built in 1999

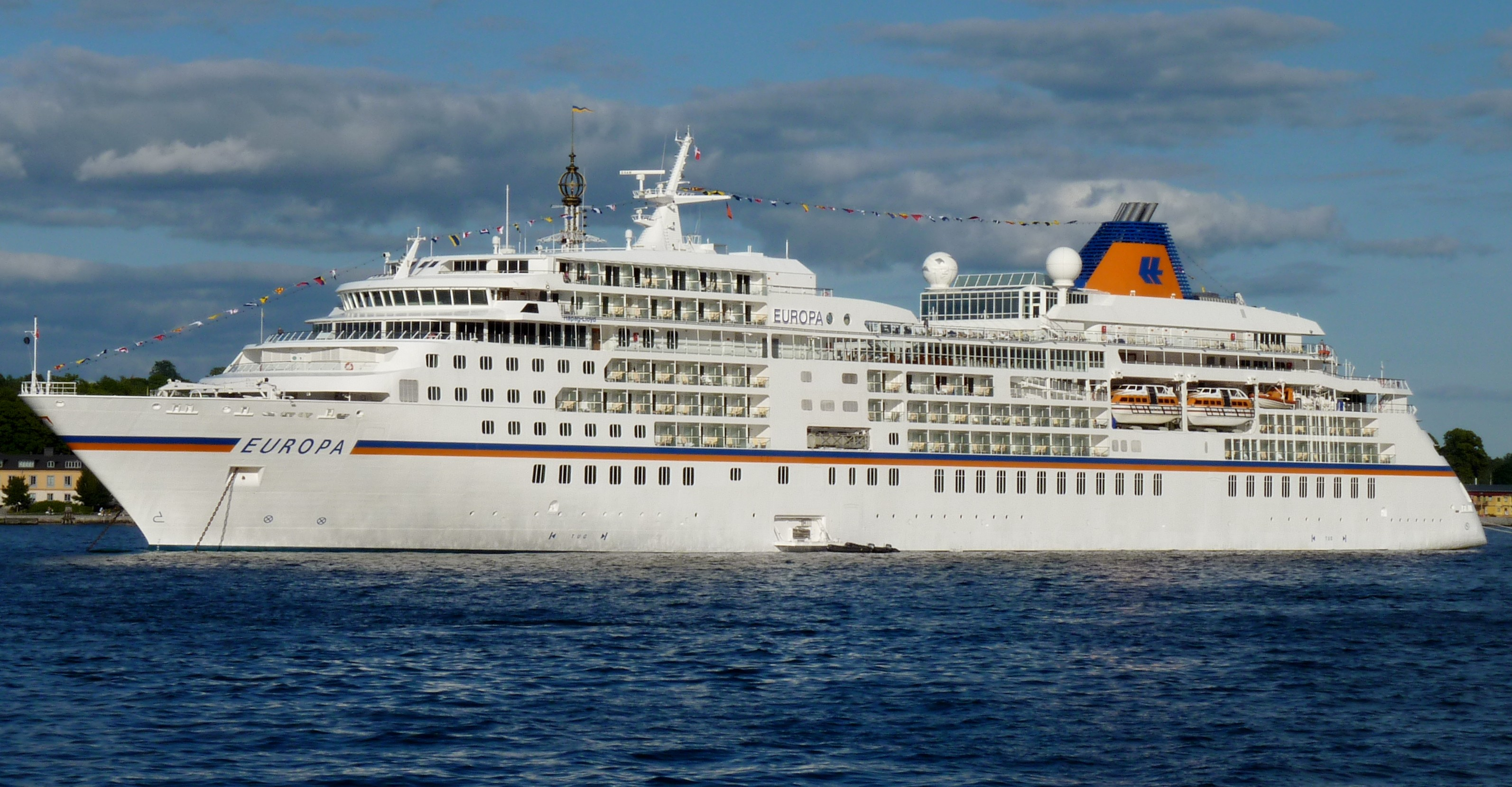
- MS Europa in Stockholm Harbour in August 2013

History
- Name: Europa
- Owner: Hapag-Lloyd
- Operator: Hapag-Lloyd Cruises
- Port of registry: 1999–2020: Nassau, Bahamas; 2020 onwards: Valletta, Malta
- Ordered: 28 November 1997
- Builder: Kvaerner Masa-Yards Hietalahti shipyard, Helsinki, Finland
- Yard number: 495
- Laid down: 26 June 1998
- Launched: 4 March 1999
- Completed: 9 September 1999
- Identification: Call sign: 9HA5275; IMO number: 9183855; MMSI number: 215767000
- Status: In service

General characteristics
- Tonnage: 28,890 GT
- Length: 198.60 metres (651.6 ft)
- Beam: 24 metres (79 ft)
- Draught: 6 metres (20 ft)
- Decks: 11 (7 passenger-accessible)
- Propulsion: Diesel-electric transmission with two MAN B&W 7L40/54 and two 8L40/54, 21.6 MW total
- Speed: 21 knots
- Capacity: 408 passengers in 204 suites
- Crew: 275

MS Europa is a cruise ship owned and operated by the German company Hapag-Lloyd Cruises. It is the 6th ship to be named Europa in the company's history. For twelve years in a row, the MS Europa was awarded the title "best cruise ship in the world" by Ward-Ranking and Berlitz. The previous Europa is currently sailing as the Saga Sapphire for Saga Cruises.

== Design ==
=== Exterior ===
Europa was designed as a luxury cruise ship. Europa was one of the first ships designed with the ABB Azipod propulsion system, implemented to reduce vibration towards the stern of the ship.

=== Interior design and facilities ===
There are 204 passenger cabins of various sizes.

Facilities include an atrium, casino, dining area, swimming pools, cinema and a gym and spa. The ship also has a designated nude sunbathing deck.

During COVID-19 pandemic, the ship docked in Puerta Vallarta, Mexico. The government announced on 25 March that it would receive cruise ships “for humanitarian reasons,” but that passengers would be individually "fumigated" before being taken directly to airports to be returned to their home countries. The protocol would apply to Europa and other ships in Mexican waters.
