= MV Aegean Odyssey =

Cruise ship

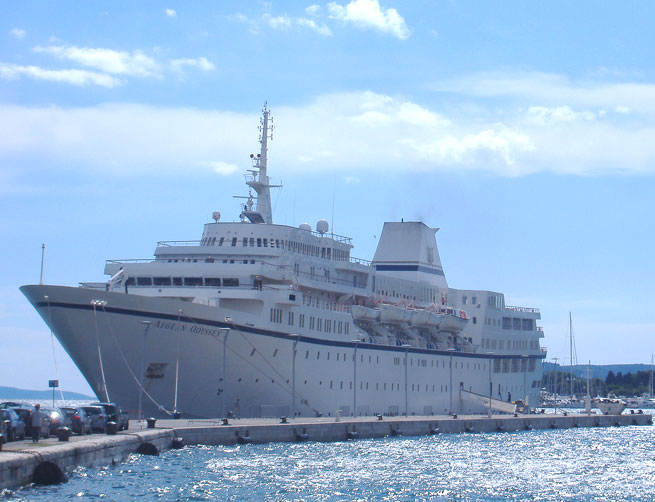
- Aegean Odyssey

History
- Name: 1973–1985: Narcis; 1985–1986: Alkyon; 1986–1989: Aegean Dolphin; 1989–1990: Dolphin; 1990–1996: Aegean Dolphin; 1996–2010: Aegean I; 2010 onwards: Aegean Odyssey
- Owner: 1973–1985: Zim Navigation; 1985–1998: Dolphin Hellas Shipping; 1998–2008: Golden Sun Cruises; 2008–2016: Aegean Experience Maritime Co Ltd; 2016 onwards: Aegean Odyssey Maritime-Pan
- Operator: Voyages to Antiquity
- Port of registry: 1973–1985: Haifa, Israel; 1985–2009: Piraeus, Greece; 2009–2016: Valletta, Malta; 2016 onwards: Panama City, Panama
- Builder: Santierul Naval Galați, Galați, Romania
- Yard number: 617
- Laid down: 18 June 1971
- Launched: 18 June 1972
- Completed: 22 August 1973
- Identification: Call sign HOBW; IMO number: 7225910; MMSI number: 374757000
- Status: In service

General characteristics
- Type: Cruise ship
- Tonnage: 11,906 GT
- Length: 461 ft (140.51 m)
- Beam: 67 ft (20.42 m)
- Draught: 20 ft (6.10 m)
- Decks: 8 decks; 7 decks passenger accessible
- Speed: 18 knots (33 km/h; 21 mph) (service speed)
- Capacity: 380 passengers
- Crew: 180

MV Aegean Odyssey is a cruise ship owned and operated by Voyages to Antiquity, a one-ship cruise company established in 2009. Built as a ferry in 1973, it was converted to a cruise ship in 1988, and substantially rebuilt in 2010.

== History ==
The MV Aegean Odyssey was built in 1973 as the Zim ro-ro ferry Narcis, later renamed Alkyon in 1985. In 1986, she was bought by Dolphin Hellas Cruises, which renamed the ship Aegean Dolphin and sent it to Perama to be converted into a cruise ship. Following the completion of renovations in 1988, the ship remained in the cruise line's fleet until 1995, when she was sold to Epirotiki Line. It was renamed Aegean I whilst on charter to Renaissance Cruises in 1996. Then the ship operated for Golden Sun Cruises on Mediterranean cruises since 1997–1998, still owned by Dolphin Hellas. In 2005, she was to be bought by Louis Hellenic Cruise Lines, but the deal fell through due to legal problems, and the ship was laid up.

She was bought by the new cruise company 'Voyages to Antiquity' in 2009, as part of a new venture by cruise line veteran Gerry Herrod. The cruise was operated by Turkish travel agency Etstur in 2013 and 2015 summer seasons for Greek Islands tours.

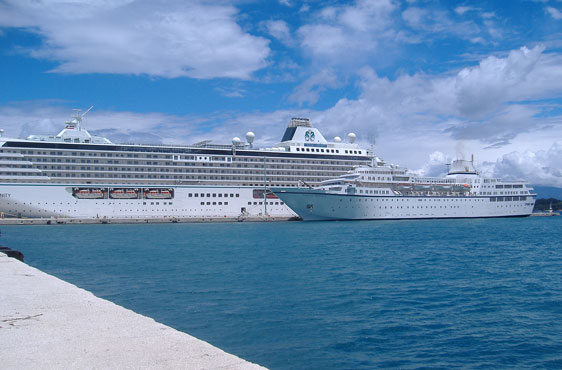
Aegean Odyssey docked next to Crystal Serenity.

The ship was refitted and renovated in Ermoupoli on the Greek island of Syros to cater for cruising in the coastal waters of the central and southern Mediterranean – she can visit ports that are too small for most cruise ships and began operation again in May 2010, renamed Aegean Odyssey.

The passenger capacity was reduced from 570 to around 380 in order to provide more spacious accommodation; the cinema was removed in favour of a lecture hall, and new dining areas established.

The ship's ownership changed on 30 April 2010, four days before its inaugural cruise departure. Its registered owner is Samos (Island) Maritime Co. Ltd based in Piraeus.

Ship company owner Voyages to Antiquity announced that it ended its services at the end of October 2019, and the Oxford office was to close, due to motor failures and trips cancelled. From April 2020 to April 2023 the ship was to be chartered to US not-for-profit organizationRoad Scholar, undertaking educational voyages.
