= MS Island Sky =

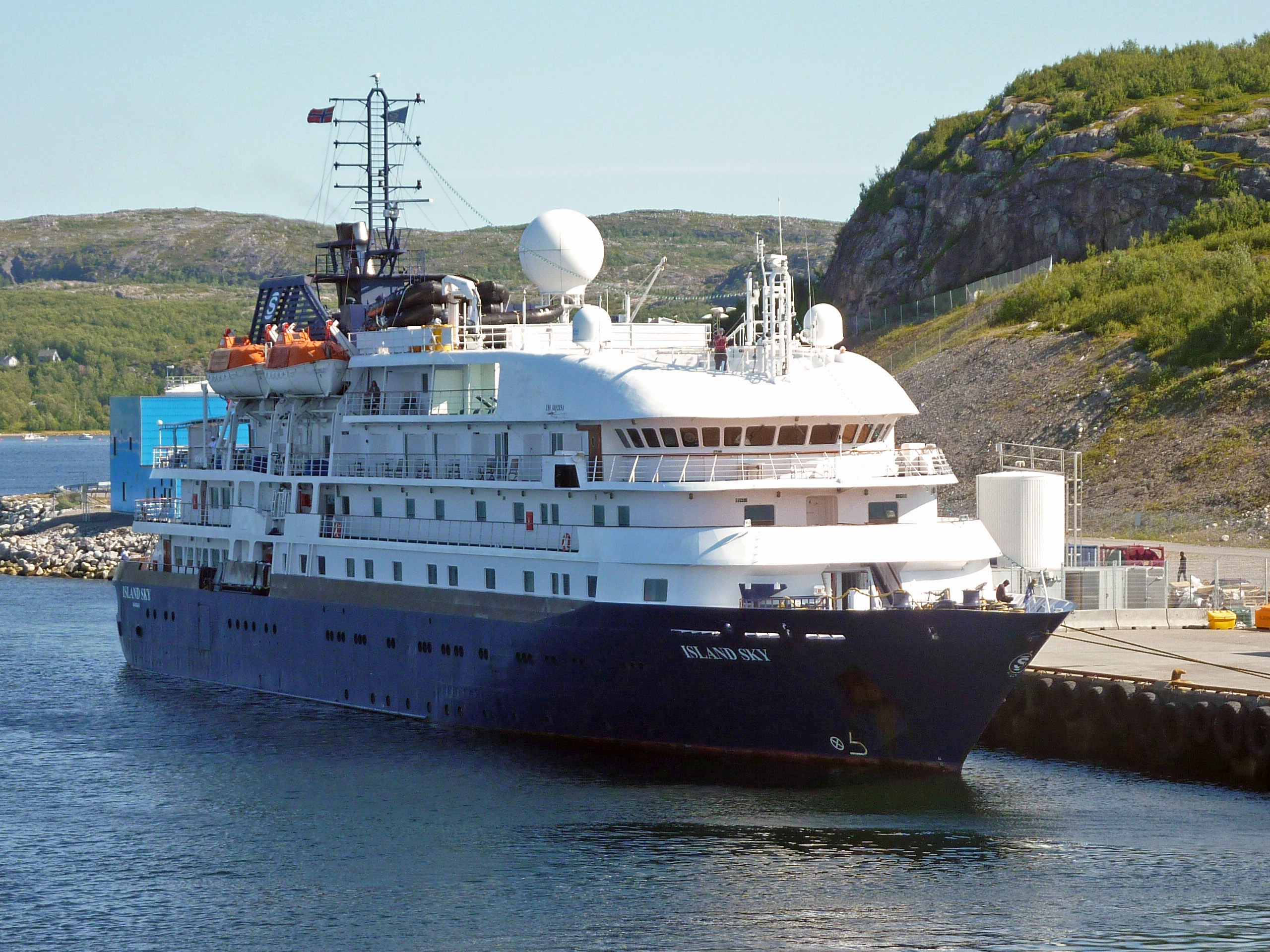
Island Sky in Kirkenes, Norway (2014)

MS Island Sky is a 118 berth cruise ship owned and operated by London-based cruise company Noble Caledonia. On 19 July 2021 it became the first cruise ship to visit Scotland since the onset of the COVID-19 pandemic in that country, and after the Scottish Government moved Scotland into the lowest level of COVID restrictions which included the reopening of seaports. As part of a UK coastal cruise, the ship arrived at Lerwick Harbour in Shetland, where it docked at Victoria Pier. The boat had 66 passengers on board, roughly half its capacity.
