= Aegean Paradise =

Cruise ship built in 1990

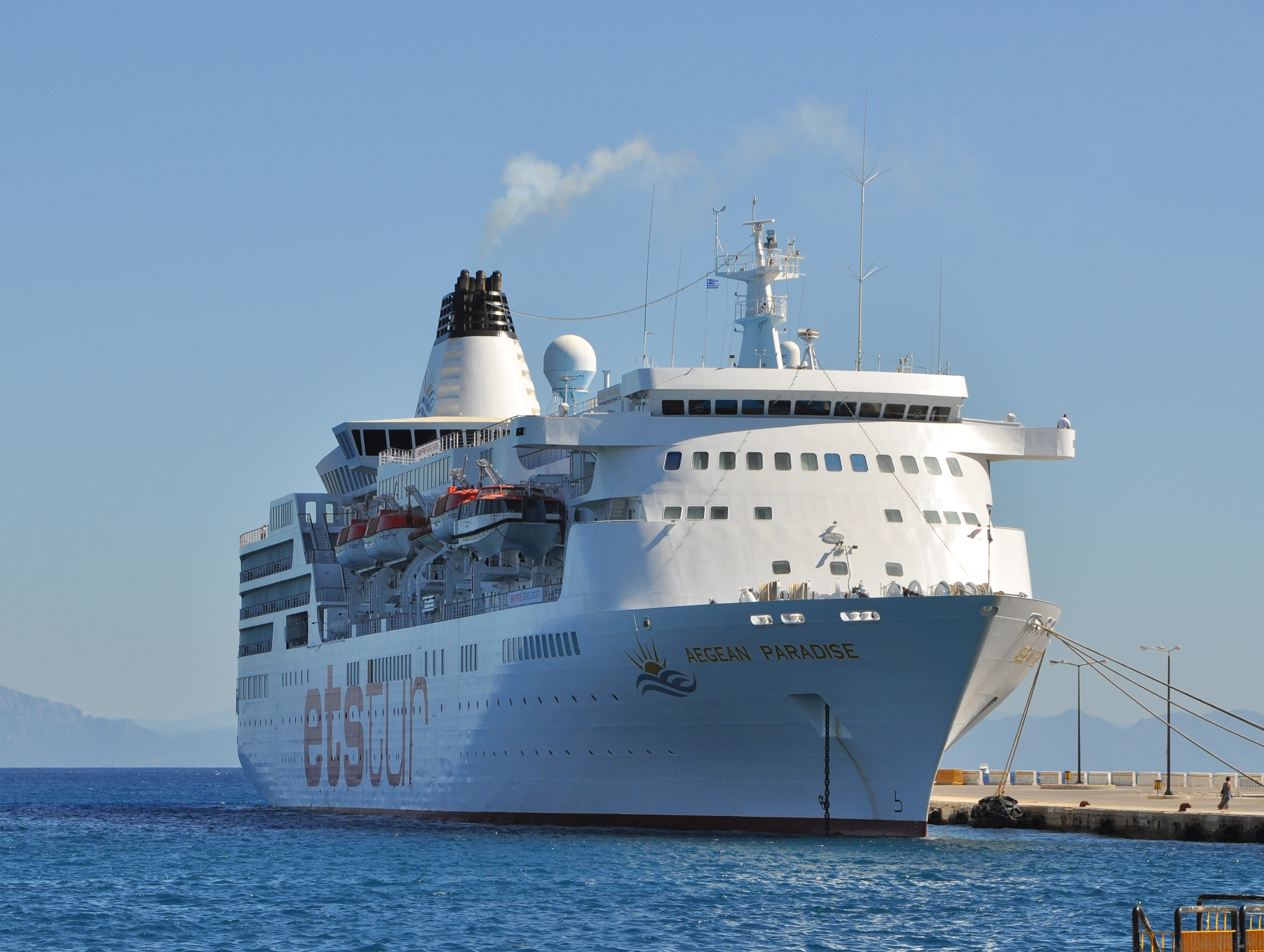
- Aegean Paradise at Rhodes (Greece) on 3 June 2013

History
- Name: 1990–2005: Orient Venus; 2005–2007: Cruise One; 2007–2010: Delphin Voyager; 2011: Hainan Empress; 2011–2012: Happy Dolphin; 2012 onwards: Aegean Paradise
- Owner: 1990–2005: Shin Nihonkai Ferry Co. Ltd.; 2005–2011: First Cruise One Corp.; 2011–July 2015: Hainan Cruises Enterprises Ltd.; July 2015 onwards: New Century Maritime
- Operator: 1990–2005: Japan Cruise Line; 2005–2007: First Cruise Line; 2007–2011: Delphin Kreuzfahrten; 2011–2011: Hainan Cruise Line; 2011–2011: Quail Travel Group; 2012–2015: Etstur; July 2015 onwards: New Century Cruise Line
- Port of registry: 1990–2005: Osaka, Japan; 2005–2012: Nassau, Bahamas; 2012 onwards: Panama, Panama
- Builder: Ishikawajima-Harima Heavy Industries Co., Tokyo, Japan
- Yard number: 2987
- Launched: 26 January 1990
- Completed: 1990
- Acquired: 8 July 1990
- Identification: Call sign: C6UU6; IMO number: 8902333; MMSI number: 309877000
- Status: In service

General characteristics
- Type: Cruise ship
- Tonnage: 23,287 GT
- Length: 174 m (570 ft 10 in)
- Beam: 24 m (78 ft 9 in)
- Draught: 6.52 m (21 ft 5 in)
- Decks: 8
- Installed power: 2 x 12 cyl.four stroke single acting Pielstick diesel engines type 12PC2-6V
- Propulsion: 2 x Controllable pitch propellers
- Speed: 22 knots (41 km/h; 25 mph)
- Capacity: 650 passengers in 324 cabins

Aegean Paradise is a cruise ship operated by Singapore tour operator Universal Shipmanagement Pte Ltd. She was built in 1990 in Japan as three-stars-plus ship for Japan Cruise Line as Orient Venus which was used mainly on Japanese market.

The ship was sold to First Cruise Line and renamed Cruise One in September 2005. The ship was rebuilt from October 2005 until April 2007 at the Hellenic Shipyards of Perama in Greece, to a four-star ship. In April 2007, the ship was chartered to Delphin Kreuzfahrten and renamed Delphin Voyager. During the renovation in Greece, she was significantly modified from the original.

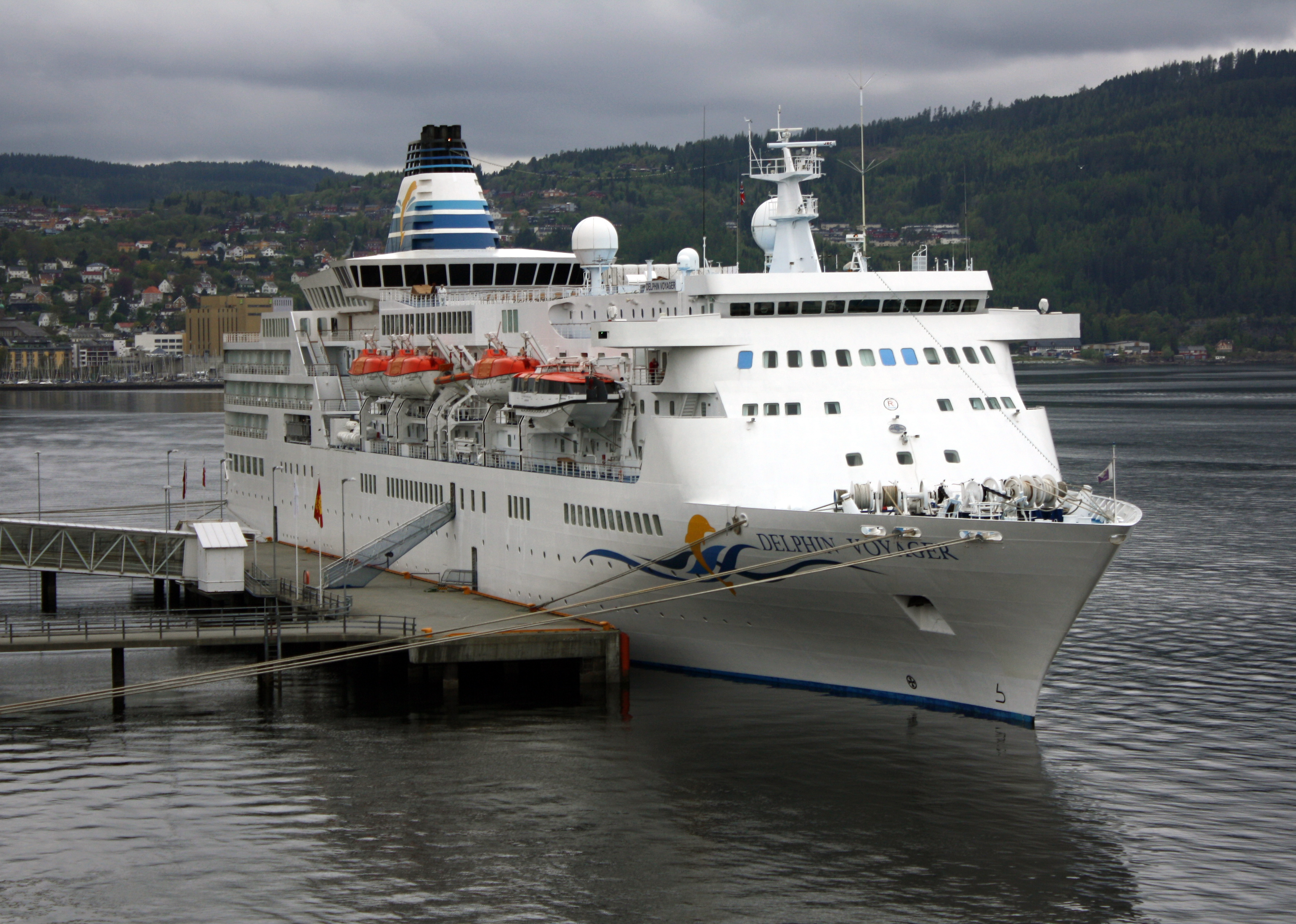
Delphin Voyager in Trondheim in May 2010

Due to the insolvency of Delphin Kreuzfahrten in October 2010, the ship was not returned. The owner of the ship, took First Cruise One Corp., the daughter of Greek company Restis Group, the ship returned to Greece, where it was at Perama on roadstead, before it was chartered for next few months in China in 2011. From January 2011 ship was chartered by Chinese investor group Hainan Cruises Enterprises under name Hainan Empress which was ended in May 2011. The ship was chartered to Quail/Happy Cruises under the name Happy Dolphin. Since the bankruptcy of Quail in 2011, Happy Dolphin has been laid up in Piraeus. She has been chartered for the 2012 summer season to a Turkish tour operator, Etstur and was renamed to Aegean Paradise. She cruised from İzmir and was cruised 2, 3 and 4 nights to the Greek Islands for the first time. At the end of August she will be deployed to Istanbul where she will do 3, 5, 6 and 7-night cruises to the Greek Islands and to the Black Sea. The season will end at 28 September when the ship arrives to Istanbul.

On 24 July 2015, the ship was sold to Kingston Maritime, a wholly owned subsidiary of New Century Maritime, for US$22.89 million. Aegean Paradise was delivered to Kingston Maritime at ST Marine Shipyard in Singapore. After refurnishing at the shipyard, the ship will join 2 other casino ships owned by the same company. She will be operating as a casino cruise ship off the Indonesian island of Batam. New Century Maritime is indirectly owned by New Century Group of Hong Kong. The ship was wrongly reported to have been sold on 5 December 2015 to Diamond Cruise by China Cruise and Yacht Industry News. She is in fact been refurnished in a Singapore shipyard and is scheduled to commence operation as a casino cruise ship off the Indonesian island of Batam on 8 January 2016. Due to engine problems, her launch on 8 January 2016 was delayed. She finally started operation on 12 Jan and is now operating in Penang as a casino cruise ship catering mainly to Singapore punters.

== Technical data and statistics ==
The ship is of two 4-Stroke-12 cylinder Diesel engines by Pielstick with a propulsion of 6,568 kW. These engines use two controllable-pitch propellers. The ship reaches with a speed of 20 knots.

For the current supply, three Diesel generators achieve 1,600 kW (Apparent power: 2,000 kVA) as well as an emergency generator which achieves 210 kW (Apparent power: 263 kVA) for the order.

The ship has eight passenger decks. Up to 650 passengers are accommodated in 326 cabins.
