= MV Porto =

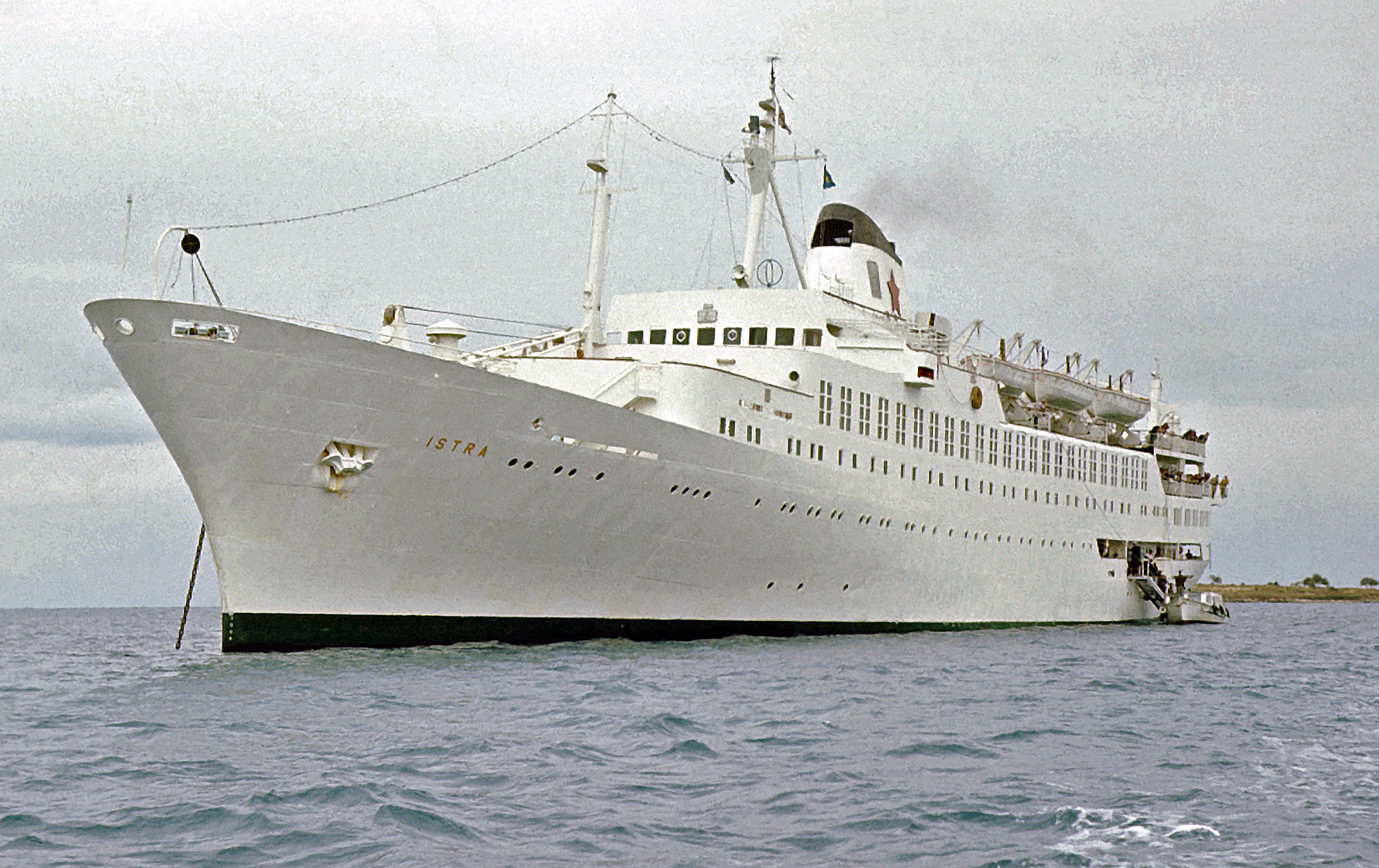
- Istra in October 1972

History
- Name: 1965–1991: Istra; 1991–1996: Astra; 1996–1999: Astra I; 1999–1999: Nautilus 2000; 1999–2013: Arion; 2013–2018: Porto
- Owner: Arcalia Shipping Co. Ltd.
- Operator: Classic International Cruises 1965–2012; Portuscale Cruises 2013–2017
- Builder: Brodogadiliste Uljanik, Pula, Croatia
- Launched: 20 July 1964
- Completed: 1965
- Maiden voyage: 1965
- In service: 1965
- Identification: Call sign: CQUU; IMO number: 6419057; MMSI number: 255969000
- Fate: Scrapped in Aliağa, Turkey, 2018

General characteristics
- Tonnage: 5,888 GT
- Length: 116.82 m (383.3 ft)
- Beam: 16.54 m (54.3 ft)
- Draught: 6.2 m (20 ft)
- Decks: 5
- Speed: 14.4 knots (27 km/h)
- Capacity: 300

The MV Porto was a Portuguese-owned cruise ship. She had operated by Portuscale Cruises until sold for scrap in 2017.

The ship was built in 1965, as the Istra. She was purchased by Arcadia Shipping Company, Lisbon in 2000 and was completely reconstructed from the hull up, being renamed Arion. She was put in service with Classic International Cruises

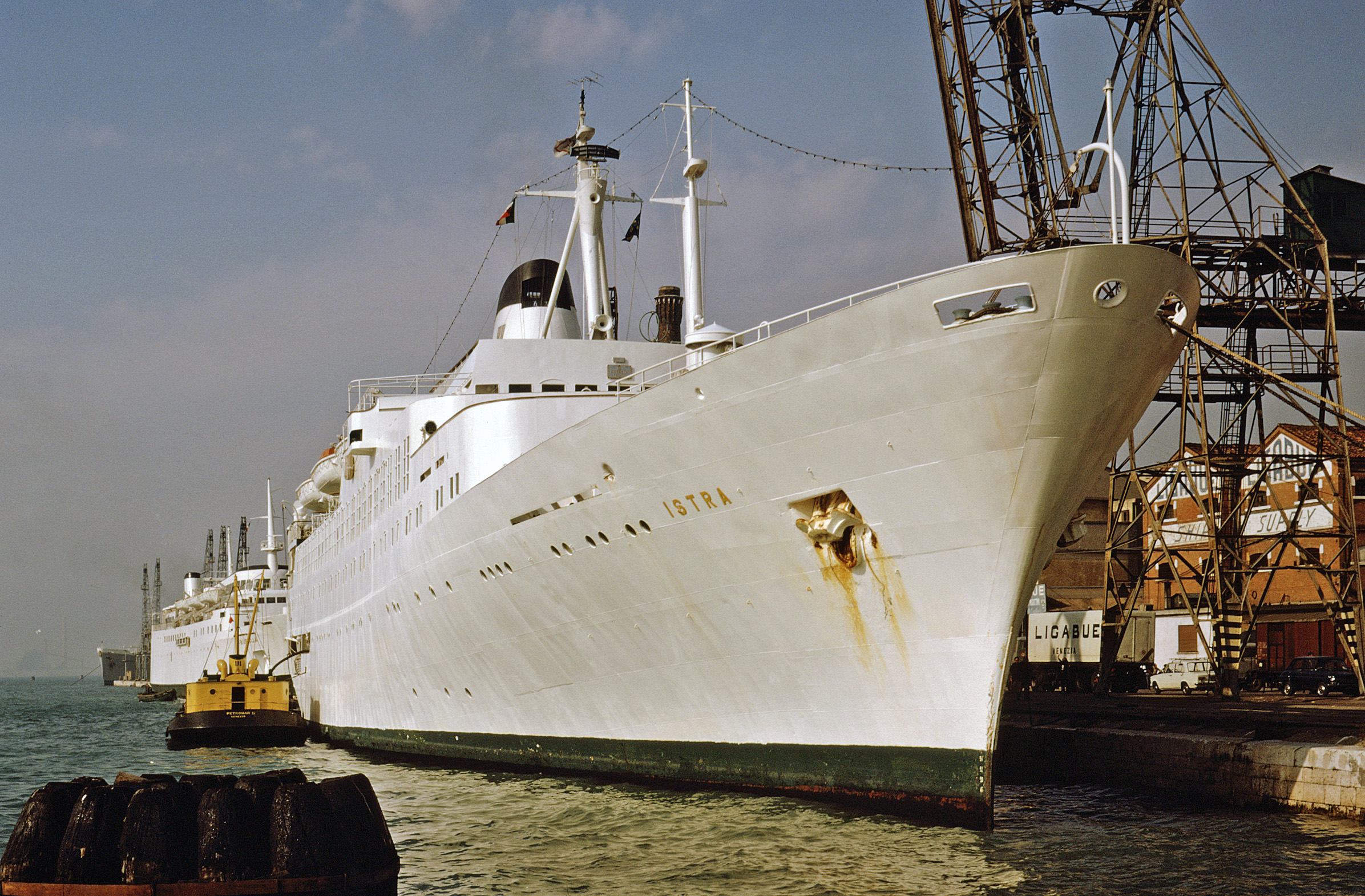
Istra in Venice, October 1972

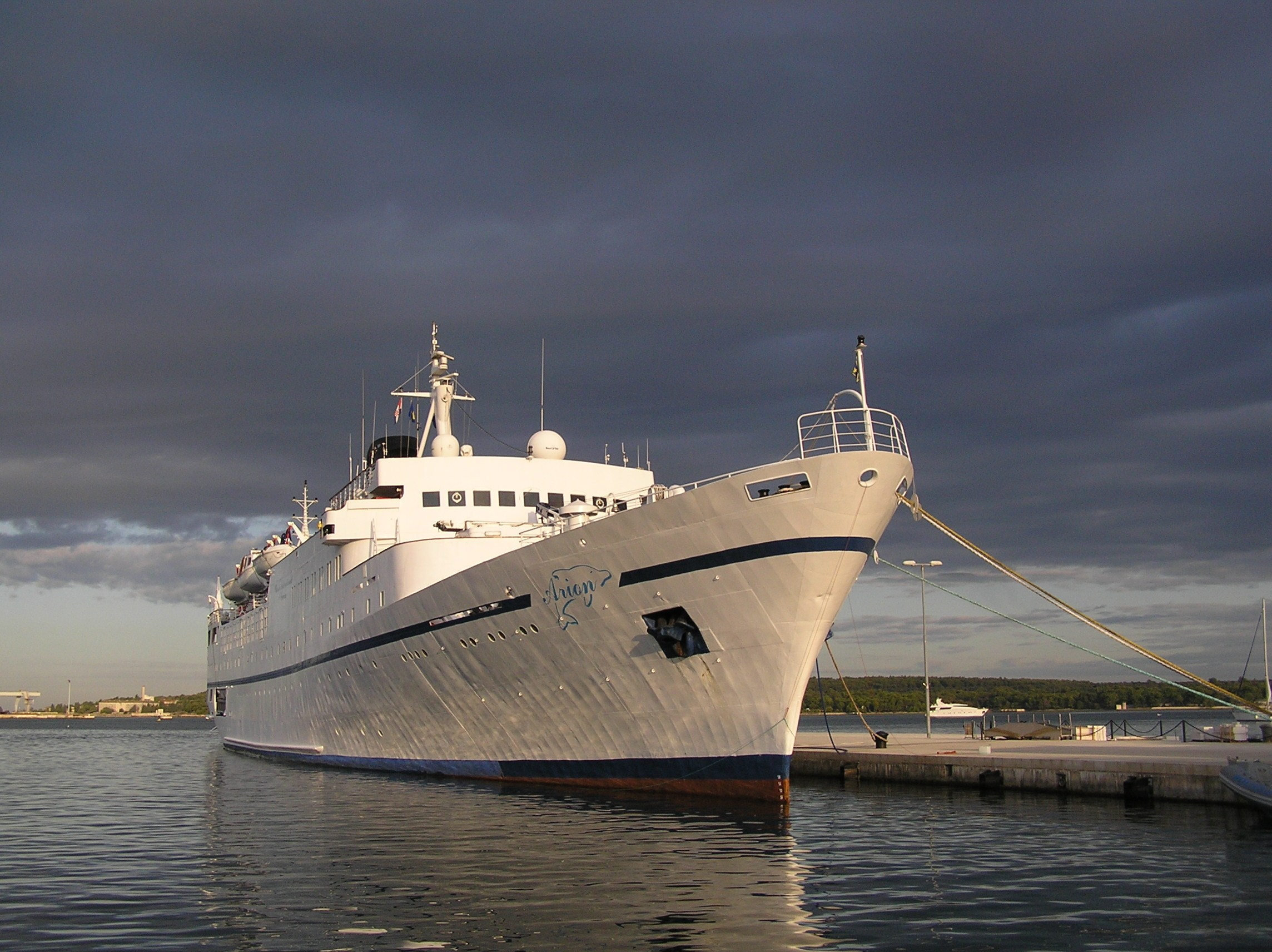
Arion in Croatia

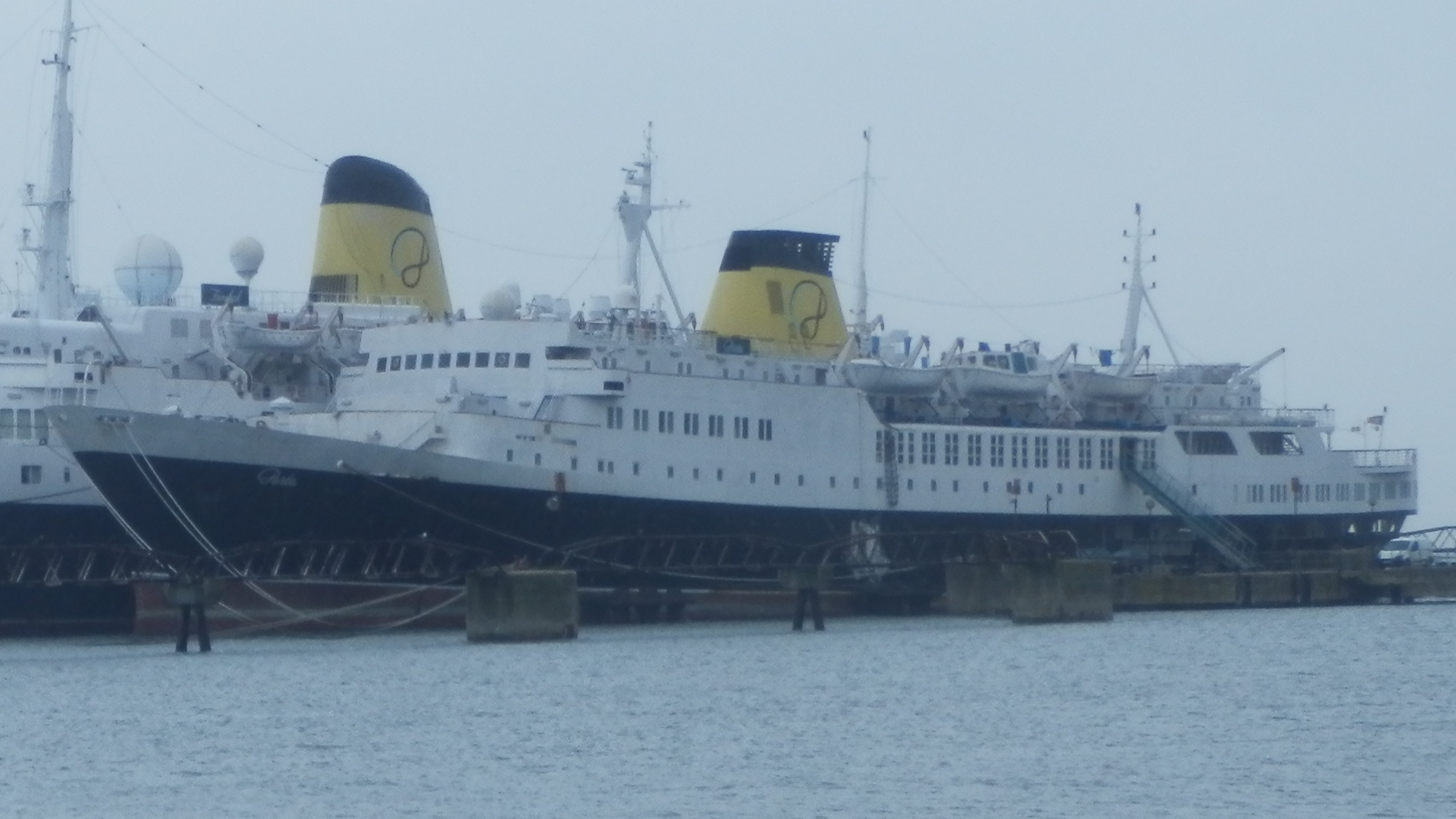
Porto and Funchal laid up in Lisbon

On 17 September 2012 reports announced that she was detained in Montenegro for failure to pay fuel costs. Fellow ships Athena and Princess Danae were detained for similar issues.

Following the liquidation of Classic International Cruises, Arion was purchased by a Portuguese entrepreneur and remained flagged under the Portuguese flag. The ship was renamed Porto in 2013, and operated by the Portuguese cruise company Portuscale Cruises.

In 2017, the ship was sold for €1.05 million for scrapping and broken up on 5 November 2018 at Aliaga.
