= Port Line =

Former British passenger and cargo shipping company

- House flag
- Industry: Shipping
- Founded: 1914
- Defunct: 1982
- Fate: Elements merged into Cunard Line operations
- Headquarters: London, United Kingdom
- Area served: Australasia
- Services: Refrigerated and general cargo & passengers; later containers

Port Line was a passenger and cargo shipping company, initially formed as the Commonwealth and Dominion Line in 1914, and in operation in one form or another until 1982. The company was formed by an amalgamation of four shipping companies with routes to Australia and New Zealand. It was taken over by the Cunard Line in 1916 but operated largely autonomously.

== Formation ==
The Commonwealth and Dominion Line was formed as an amalgamation of four shipping companies on 23 January 1914, J. P. Corry & Company, Wm. Milburn & Company, Thos. B. Royden & Company and Tyser & Company. All four companies had operated routes to Australia and New Zealand, and together formed a new shipping line of 23 ships. Milburn & Co brought nine ships, Tyser & Co. eight, Corry & Co. five and Royden & Co. three. The company's head office was at Tyser & Company's former officers at 9-11 Fenchurch Street in London. The board of directors was drawn from the directors of the constituent companies and was under the overall chairmanship of Walter Tyser. Representing Thos. B. Royden & Co. was Thomas Royden, later chairman of Cunard.

Reflecting the make up of its constituting companies, the ships of the new line adopted a varied arrangement of existing styles. The ships flew Tyser's house flag but had Corry's funnel colours of buff with black tops. The overall scheme followed Tyser's patterns of grey with white superstructure and masts, while Milburn & Co's practice of naming ships with the prefix 'Port' was extended to new ships then under construction for the company, and then expanded further in 1916 by renaming all existing ships under this style. This practice led to the name 'Port Line' coming into unofficial use.

== Cunard ownership ==
Commonwealth and Dominion was taken over by the Cunard Line in June 1916, at the initiative of Thomas Royden, who was already a director of Cunard. Several Cunard directors joined the board of Commonwealth and Dominion, now renamed Cunard Line Australasian Service, Commonwealth & Dominion Line Ltd, and in exchange several Commonwealth and Dominion directors joined Cunard's board. After the war the line took Cunard's funnel colours, but otherwise remained largely autonomous within the Cunard structure. There were a number of losses to enemy action and accidents during the remainder of the First World War, with ships also being requisitioned for government service during and immediately after the war. Several new ships were ordered to replace wartime losses and to modernise the fleet. The line was particularly active in transporting frozen meat and vegetables between Australia, New Zealand and Britain.

The company remained profitable during the Great Depression, and between 1927 and 1932 shipped steel girders from Middlesbrough for use in the construction of the Sydney Harbour Bridge. In 1932 Commonwealth & Dominion moved their head offices to Cunard House at 88 Leadenhall Street in London, sharing space with the Cunard Line. Also in 1932 Commonwealth & Dominion entered partnership with two other shipping companies, Ellerman & Bucknall and the New Zealand Shipping Company, to form the Montreal, Australia & New Zealand Line, to take over the Canadian National Steamship Line's services to Australasia.

== Port Line ==
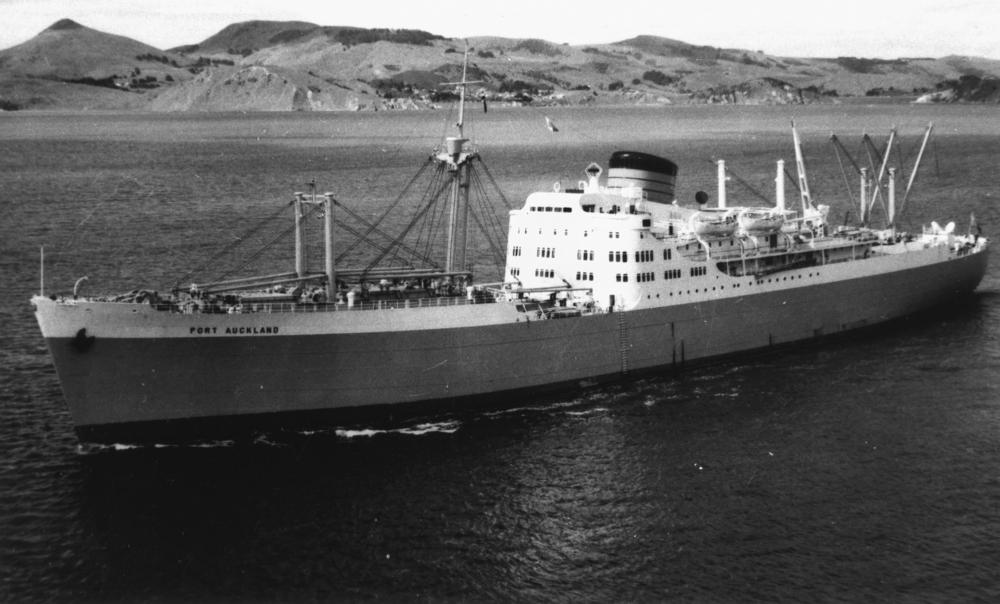
11,945 GRT cargo ship Port Auckland, built by Hawthorn Leslie & Co in 1949

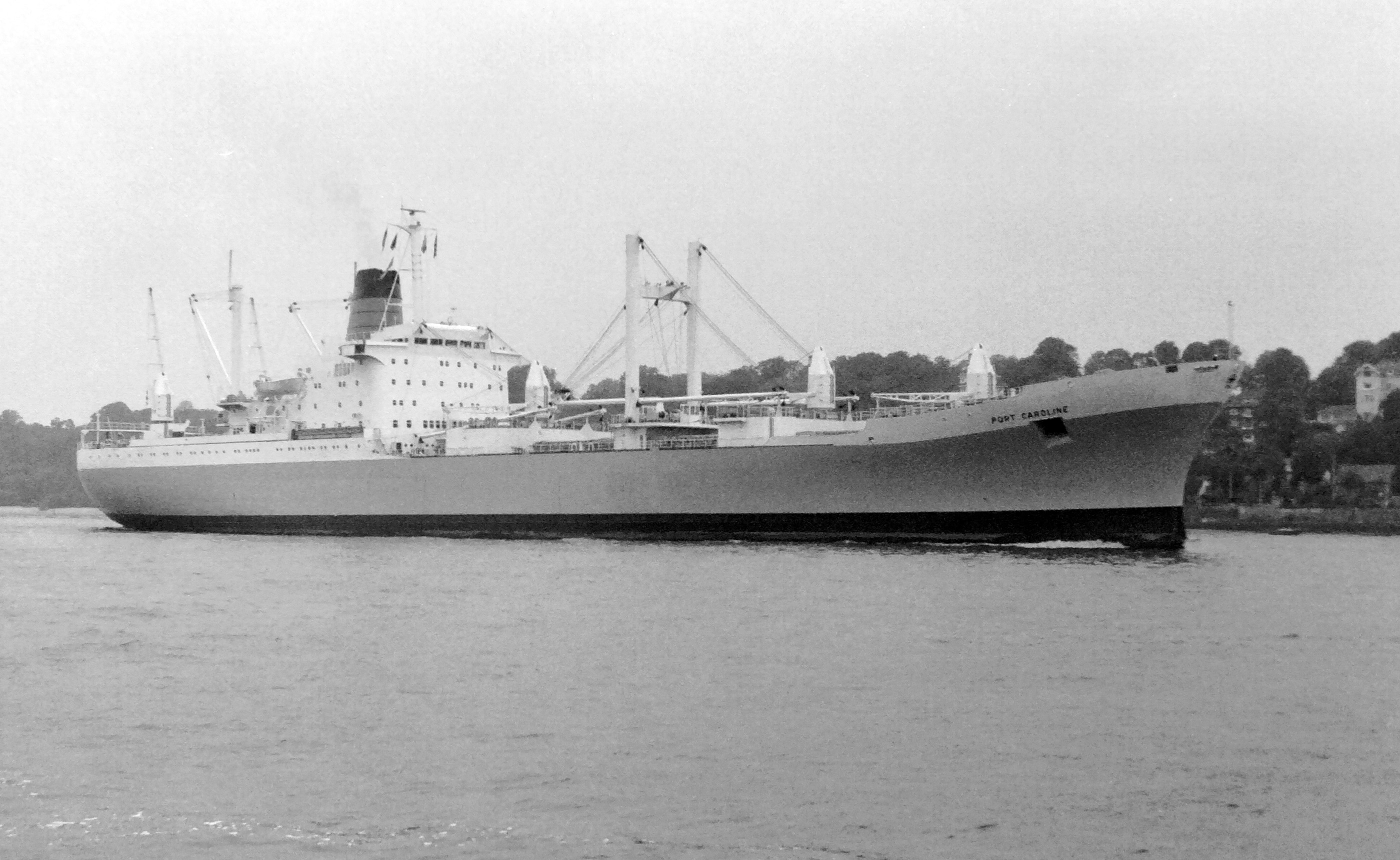
Port Caroline, one of the last cargo liners (Hamburg, 1969)

Commonwealth and Dominion officially re-branded itself 'Port Line Limited' on 18 November 1937. The company suffered a number of losses during the Second World War to a variety of causes, including accidents, submarines, surface raiders and air attacks. In total thirteen ships were sunk, and another building programme was begun after the war. Port Line entered another partnership in 1957, combining with the Blue Star Line, Shaw, Savill & Albion and the New Zealand Shipping Company, to form the Crusader Shipping Co. Ltd., to trade between New Zealand, the Far East and the Pacific coast of North America.

With containerisation increasing, Port Line, Blue Star Line, Ellerman, Ben Line and the Charente Steamship Company formed Associated Container Transportation Ltd. on 12 January 1966, incorporating a subsidiary, Associated Container Transportation (Australia) Ltd., which would eventually supersede the Montreal, Australia & New Zealand Line. However a process of retrenchment at Cunard in 1968 saw the incorporation of Blue Star Port Line (Management) Ltd, also known as 'Blueport', to cut costs.

== Consolidation ==
The process continued with Cargo Equipment Service Co. Ltd. (CESCO) being formed in New Zealand to take over the equipment of Blueport, Shaw, Savill & Albion and the New Zealand Shipping Co., while in Australia the offices of Port Line and Blue Star were amalgamated with those of Ellerman & Bucknall to form Joint Cargo Services Ltd. New jointly operated shipping companies were created by the constituent companies to continue to operate shipping routes, including the Atlas Line and the Compass Line, which operated both Port Line and Blue Star Line ships. The Actanz Line was formed in 1969, consolidating all remaining conventional Port Line, Blue Star and Ellerman Lines ships under the title of Blue Star Port Lines (Management). Further management changes followed throughout the 1970s, with the fleets being steadily reduced in the face of containerization. Port Line withdrew from the now unprofitable Crusader Shipping in 1972, and in 1973 Joint Cargo Services Ltd was divided into two.

The joint cargo service operated by Port Line and Blue Star ceased to operate in 1974, and Blue Star Port Lines (Management) Ltd closed. The last remaining conventional cargo ships still owned by the group at this point were transferred to Cunard-Brocklebank's control, ending Port Line's existence as an autonomous business entity. The remaining fleet was steadily reduced, and Cunard took over the crewing of ships. The Port Line name was subsumed into Associated Container Transportation in 1978, the remaining ships were transferred or scrapped over the next few years until the last Port ships were transferred to the Brocklebank fleet in 1982, ending the last vestiges of the Port Line.

Two of Port Line's UK-Australia service freighters, both built in 1954, were later converted into cruise ships by 1974: the Port Sydney and the Port Melbourne, which became known as the Princess Daphne and the Princess Danae, respectively. Uniquely, the Princess Daphne was the first cruise ship since 1959 in service between New Orleans and Cuba in 1977. The Princess Daphne was scrapped in Alang, India in 2014 while the Princess Danae trades for a Portuguese company Portuscale Cruises and was renamed Lisboa. Princess Danae was broken up in 2015 at Aliağa, Turkey.

== See also ==
- SR Merchant Navy Class 35027 Port Line, a preserved SR Merchant Navy class steam locomotive named after the company
