= Princess Daphne =

Princess Daphne may refer to:

- Princess Daphne (Dragon's Lair), a character from Dragon's Lair
- Princess Daphne (ship), a 1954 former vessel
