= MV Ocean Majesty =

Cruise ship built in 1966

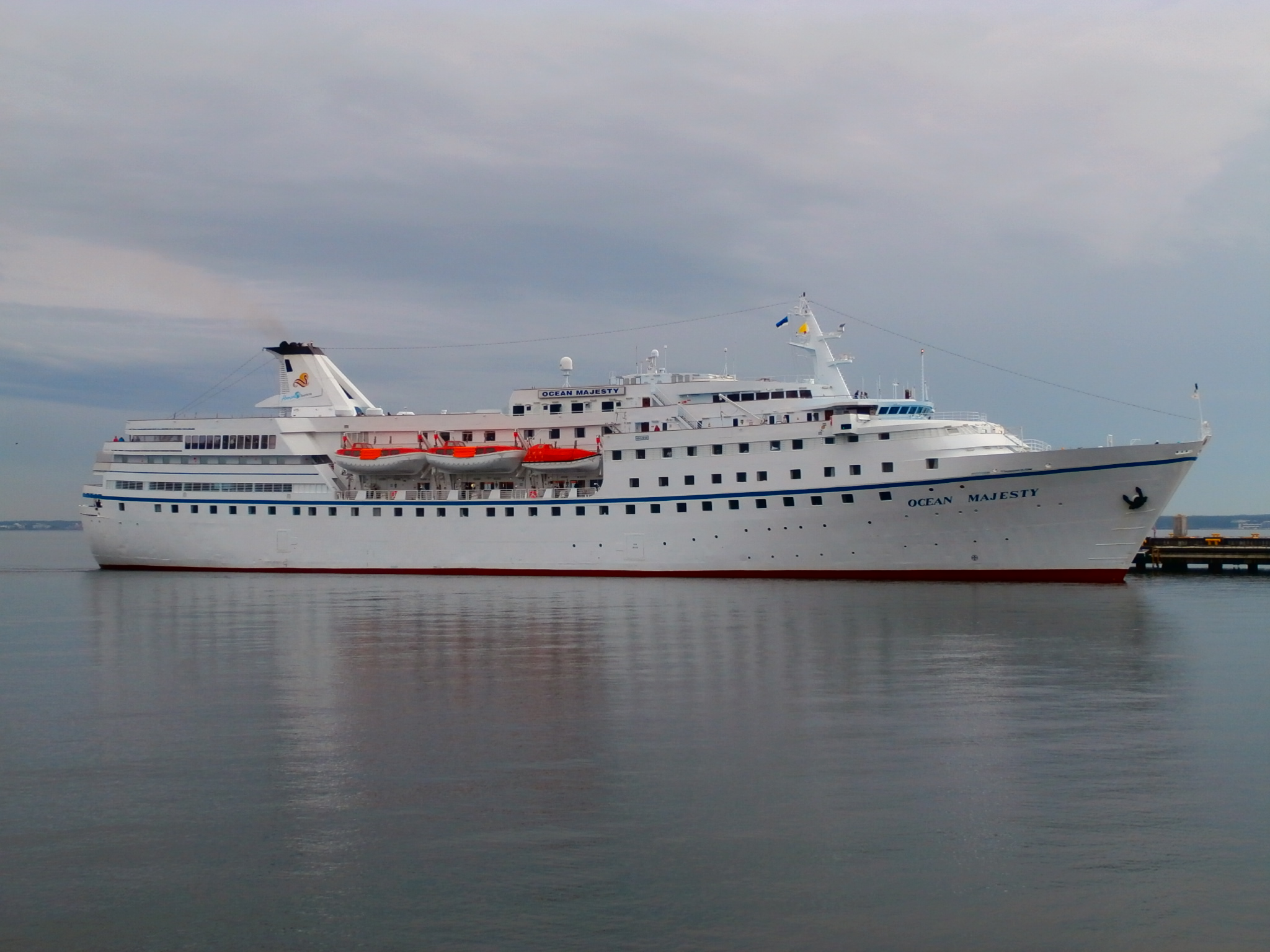
- Ocean Majesty arriving in Tallinn on 24 May 2017

History

Portugal
- Name: 1966–1985: Juan March; 1985–1986: Sol Christina; 1986–1988: Kypros Star; 1988–1994: Ocean Majesty; 1994–1995: Olympic; 1995: Homeric; 1995–present: Ocean Majesty
- Owner: 1966–1985: Trasmediterránea; 1985–1986: Sol Mediterranean; 1986–1987: Opale Lines; 1989 – present: Majestic International Cruises
- Port of registry: 1966–1985: Valencia, Spain; 1985–1989: Limassol, Cyprus; 1989–2003: Piraeus, Greece; 2003–2022: Madeira, Portugal
- Builder: Unión Naval de Levante
- Yard number: 93
- Launched: 4 December 1965
- Acquired: 27 July 1966
- In service: 1966
- Identification: Call sign CQSC; IMO number: 6602898; MMSI number: 255717000
- Status: In service

General characteristics
- Tonnage: 10,417 GRT
- Length: 135 metres (443 ft)
- Beam: 15.8 metres (52 ft)
- Speed: 18 knots
- Capacity: 535 (normal); 621 (maximum)
- Crew: 257

MV Ocean Majesty is a cruise ship, originally built in 1966 as the ferry Juan March. The ship is now registered in the International Shipping Register of Madeira (MAR), Portugal.

== History ==
Ocean Majesty was launched as Juan March for the Madrid based ferry operator Trasmediterránea. She was the first of two near identical Albatros-class sisters, the other being the Las Palmas de Gran Canaria. During her service with her original owners Juan March was mainly used to ferry passengers from Spain to the Balearic Islands. In 1985 Juan March was sold to the Sol Mediterranean and became Sol Christina. She was not operated long by these owners, and was sold to become the Kyros Star of Opale Lines. She was then sold to Majestic International Cruises, who rebuilt her from her original ferry-like form into a cruise ship, and she received her current name Ocean Majesty. Majestic International operated her for several years, until they chartered Ocean Majesty to Epirotiki in 1994, the latter company renamed her Homeric. Homeric operated for a year until her charter expired, and she was subsequently returned to Majestic International and named Ocean Majesty once again. Majestic International has chartered her to many different companies since 1995, most frequently to the British vacation company Page & Moy. Since 2013 she has been operated by German cruise company Hansa Touristik between May and October. During 2021 was laid up at Chalkis Shipyard, Greece before returning to service.

After being laid up for two years due to the COVID-19 pandemic, Ocean Majesty sailed for Hansa during the 2022 and 2023 seasons. In August 2023, the ship was taken out of service in order to serve as an asylum hotel in Velsen. There, it replaced Silja Europa.
