= Majestic International Cruises =

- Type: Wholly owned Subsidiary
- Industry: Travel and Tourism
- Founded: Late 1980s in Athens, Greece
- Headquarters: Glyfada, Athens, Greece
- Area served: Europe, Mediterranean Sea
- Key people: Michael Lambros, President; Costa Zalacosta, Director; Theodore Kontes, COO
- Products: Cruise line
- Parent: Kollakis Group
- Website: www.majesticcruises.gr

Majestic International Cruises, also known as Majestic Cruises, is a Greek owned cruise line that is based in Glyfada, a suburb of Athens located in Greece. The company was founded in the late 1980s and has expanded operations to throughout Europe and the Mediterranean Sea. Currently the cruise liner is not operating any vessel.

== History ==
=== Late 1980s through 1990s ===
The Majestic International Cruises group was founded in the late 1980s by a group interested in commercial production and cruising. By 1994, the cruise liner purchased its first ship, the Ocean Majesty, which had seen a major re-construction prior to its service converting from a ferry to a cruise liner. By 1998, a second ship was adopted to the fleet which was renamed to the SS Ocean Explorer I, which serviced as a hotel ship for the 1998 Expo 98 in Lisbon, Portugal.

=== 2000s ===
As Majestic gained momentum, the group bought their third ship in 2002 which was renamed to the Ocean Monarch. The ship had previously serviced the European continent. In 2004, the SS Ocean Explorer I was laid up and sold to an Indian scrap yard. Later in 2004, Majestic sent its Ocean Monarch to aid as a hospital ship during the relief efforts of the tsunami victims during the 2004 Indian Ocean earthquake.

=== 2010s ===
On November 30, 2013, the Ocean Countess went ablaze off the coast of Greece after a fire broke out on the passenger Deck 5. At the time, the ship was laid in port following the termination of its charter from Cruise & Maritime Voyages and only had five crew members aboard, all of which survived. The ship sustained major damage and was subsequently sold to a scrap yard in Aliağa, Turkey in 2014.

On September 17, 2014, Majestic's Ocean Majesty was one of the first cruising vessels to reach Crimea in years. However with its call to port, it was criticized that it was violating the European Union's sanctions on Crimea.

During 2015, Lambros reported that cruises were down from the previous year in the Greek isles noting that the financial economy in Greece has weakened the cruise liners activity and cruises would continue to shrink in the Mediterranean Sea.

== Former Fleet ==
Ship	Year built	Years serviced for Majestic	Gross tonnage	Flag	Notes	Image
Ocean Countess	1976	2004–2005	17,593 GT	Portugal	Chartered to Holiday Kreuzfahrten cruise line in 2005. Subsequently, scrapped in 2014 after a fire broke out on the 5th deck in 2013.	
Ocean Monarch	1955	2002–2003, 2006–2007	15,883 GT	Greece	Chartered to Page & Moy in 2003, sold to Monarch Classic Cruises in 2007.	
Ocean Explorer I	1944	1998–2004	20,071 GT	Greece	Sold to India scrap yard in 2004.	
Ocean Majesty	1966	1994–2023	10,417 GT	Portugal	Currently serves as a floating hotel for asylum seekers in the Netherlands.	

== See also ==
- List of cruise lines
