= Classic International Cruises =

British-Australian owned shipping company

- Company type: Cruising
- Industry: Cruise line
- Founded: 1985
- Defunct: 20 December 2012
- Headquarters: Neutral Bay, Australia
- Area served: Australia, Europe, Asia, Africa
- Services: Cruises
- Owner: World Cruises Agency
- Website: https://web.archive.org/web/20100221212405/http://uk.cic-cruises.com/

Classic International Cruises was a British-Australian owned shipping company operating five luxury cruise ships, most notably its flagship, the rebuilt ocean liner Athena. The company only operated cruise ships that are former ocean liners, the classic ships of their day (hence the company's name).

== History ==
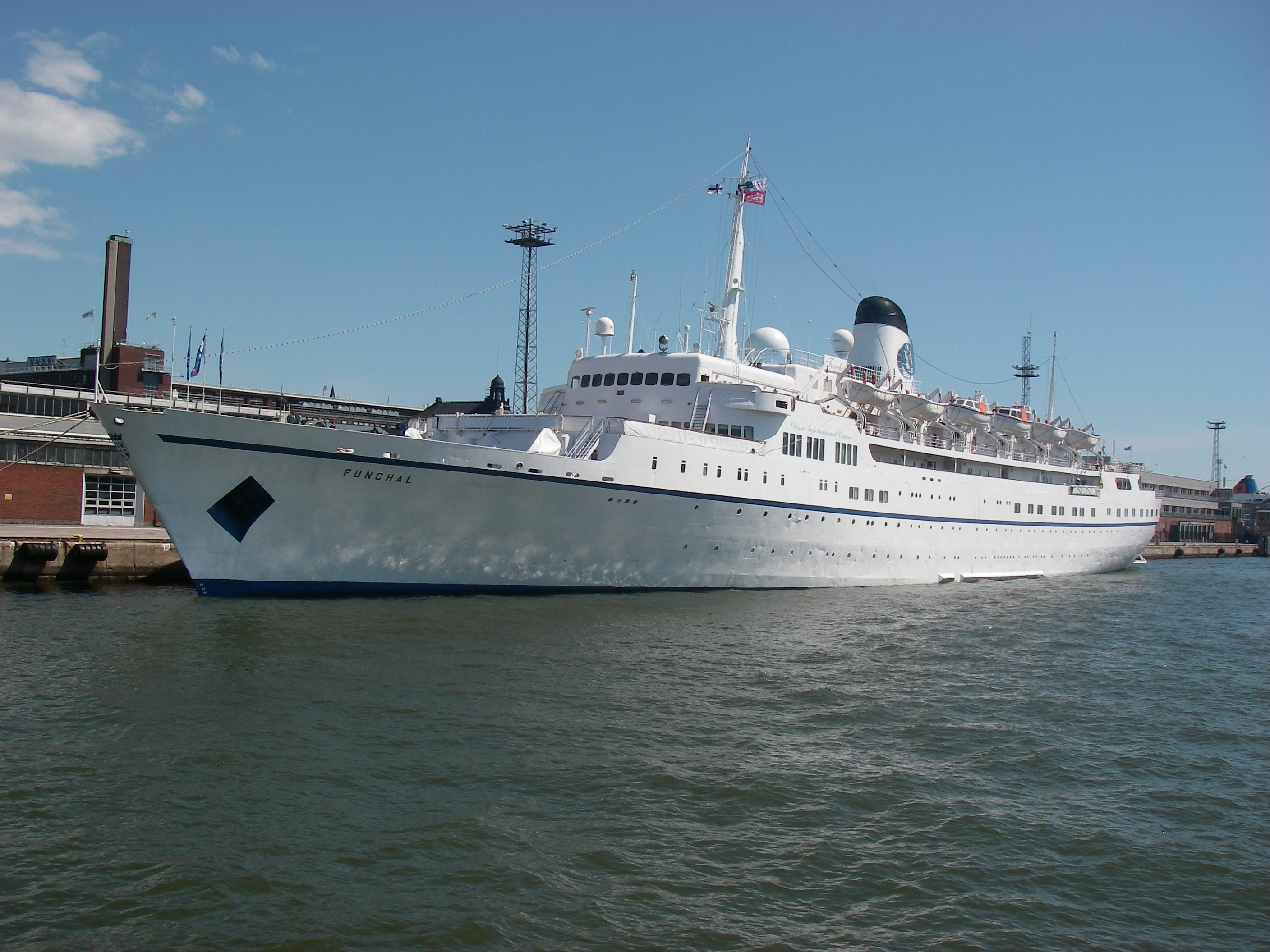
CIC's first ship, Funchal

Classic International Cruises was seemingly founded in 1985, with the purchase of Funchal as the Arcalia Shipping Company Ltd, which eventually became Classic International. They operated the one ship until 1994, when they bought the Princess Danae. The Princess Danae entered service with an all-white hull and a sailing ship logo on her funnel. Funchal was given a yellow and blue striped funnel and a white hull, but by 2000 her livery was changed to what now all Classic International ships have. Since 2000 they have purchased 3 ships, Arion, Athena and Princess Daphne, the near-identical sister of Princess Danae. With their main headquarters in Lisbon, Portugal, the company also has several branches based in Paris, France, Piraeus, Greece, Neutral Bay, Australia, Stockholm, Sweden, and London, England.

Due to unpaid bills by the line, the company's four ships, Princess Danae, Princess Daphne, Athena & Arion were all arrested, the only ship not arrested was Funchal which was laid up pending refurbishment for SOLAS.

On 20 December 2012, it was resolved to place the company into liquidation.

In the beginning of 2013, the recently created cruise company Portuscale Cruises, led by the Portuguese entrepreneur Rui Alegre, bought Princess Danae, Athena, Arion and Funchal, assuming as well the liabilities of Classic International Cruises.

== Ships ==
Ship	Built	In service	Tonnage	Status as of 2023	Image
Funchal	1961	1985–2013	9,563 GRT	Formerly a Portuguese passenger liner and presidential yacht. Transferred to Portuscale Cruises in 2013, keeping the same name, and currently is in lay up.	
Princess Danae	1955	1994–2013	16,335 GRT	Rebuilt 1972, identical to Princess Daphne. Transferred to Portuscale Cruises in 2013 and renamed Lisboa, Scrapped in Aliağa, Turkey, in 2015.	
Arion	1965	1999–2013	5,888 GRT	Originally Yugoslavian passenger ship Istra. In 2013, transferred to Portuscale Cruises and renamed Porto. Scrapped in 2018.	
Athena	1948	2005–2013	10,603 GRT	Originally Swedish ocean liner Stockholm, rebuilt 1994, under charter to Phoenix Reisen in 2009. In 2015, transferred to Cruise & Maritime Voyages and renamed Astoria. Currently undergoing scrapping at Ghent.	
Princess Daphne	1955	2008–2013	15,833 GRT	Rebuilt 1972, renamed Princess Daphne 2009. Scrapped in Alang, India, in 2014.	
