= Portuscale Cruises =

Portuguese shipping company

- Type: Cruising
- Industry: Cruise line
- Founded: 2013
- Defunct: 2021
- Headquarters: Lisbon, Portugal
- Area served: Europe
- Services: Cruises
- Owner: Rui Alegre
- Website: Portuscale Cruises

Portuscale Cruises was a Portuguese shipping company. It was the first Portuguese company specifically dedicated to maritime cruises.

Portuscale Cruises spent 20 million euros in the refurbishment of its fleet of four cruise ships, bought from defunct Classic International Cruises in early 2013.

As of 2014, the Funchal was in active service, the Azores was under charter to CMV, the Lisboa was under refit due to technicalities with the vessel, but was sold to an unknown Italian buyer and shortly after beached at Alang, India for scrap.

As of late 2016, Portuscale Cruises had gone charter, leaving the cruise market operated under its own brand.

Funchal was laid up at Matinha, with the Portuscale logos on the funnel painted over until 2021, when was transferred to docks nearby for a hotel conversion.

The only ship remained in service was the Azores, which was under charter to CMV, it was renamed her Astoria. From May 2016, until March 2017, the ship was on charter to French tour operator Rivages du Monde. In June 2016, was announced Astoria to leave the CMV fleet after her final cruise on 27 April 2017, when she was re-chartered again to Rivages du Monde until December 2017. She stayed Laid at Tilbury, UK and Rotterdam, Netherlands, after a mislead transfer and was sold to Brock Pierce.

== Funchal & Astoria Port Hotel Amenities ==
Since 2021, Brock Pierce and eleven other investors bought the 60-year-old ship Funchal, laid up in Lisbon for 8 years, intending to spend at least US$ 12 million refurbishing at Docas Rocha into a 5-star hotel. Another ship, Astoria, built in 1948, was bought in Rotterdam and is to be transferred to Lisbon for refurbishing and naval certificates and after travelling to Funchal, Madeira Islands. Both Ships are together at a marina for mega yachts in Cais da Matinha, an Investment of more than US$ 100 millions.

== Former Fleet ==
Ship	Built	Tonnage	Status as of 2018	Image
Azores	1948	10,603 GRT	Originally, the Swedish ocean liner MS Stockholm, rebuilt 1994, charterted briefly by Phoenix Reisen in 2009. Transferred from Classic International Cruises, where she was the Athena. Long-term service for Cruise & Maritime Voyages, sold to Lisbon. Sold for scrap in 2025.	
Funchal	1961	9,563 GRT	Formerly a Portuguese passenger liner and presidential yacht. Transferred from Classic International Cruises. Laid-Up until 2021, 5 Stars Hotel since 2022. Sold for scrap in 2026.	
Lisboa	1955	16,335 GRT	Rebuilt 1972. Transferred from Classic International Cruises, where she was the Princess Danae, Sold for scrap in 2015.	
Porto	1965	5,888 GRT	Originally, the Yugoslavian passenger ship MS Istra. Transferred from Classic International Cruises, where she was the Arion. Scrapped in 2018	
