= Princess Daphne (ship) =

Cruise ship

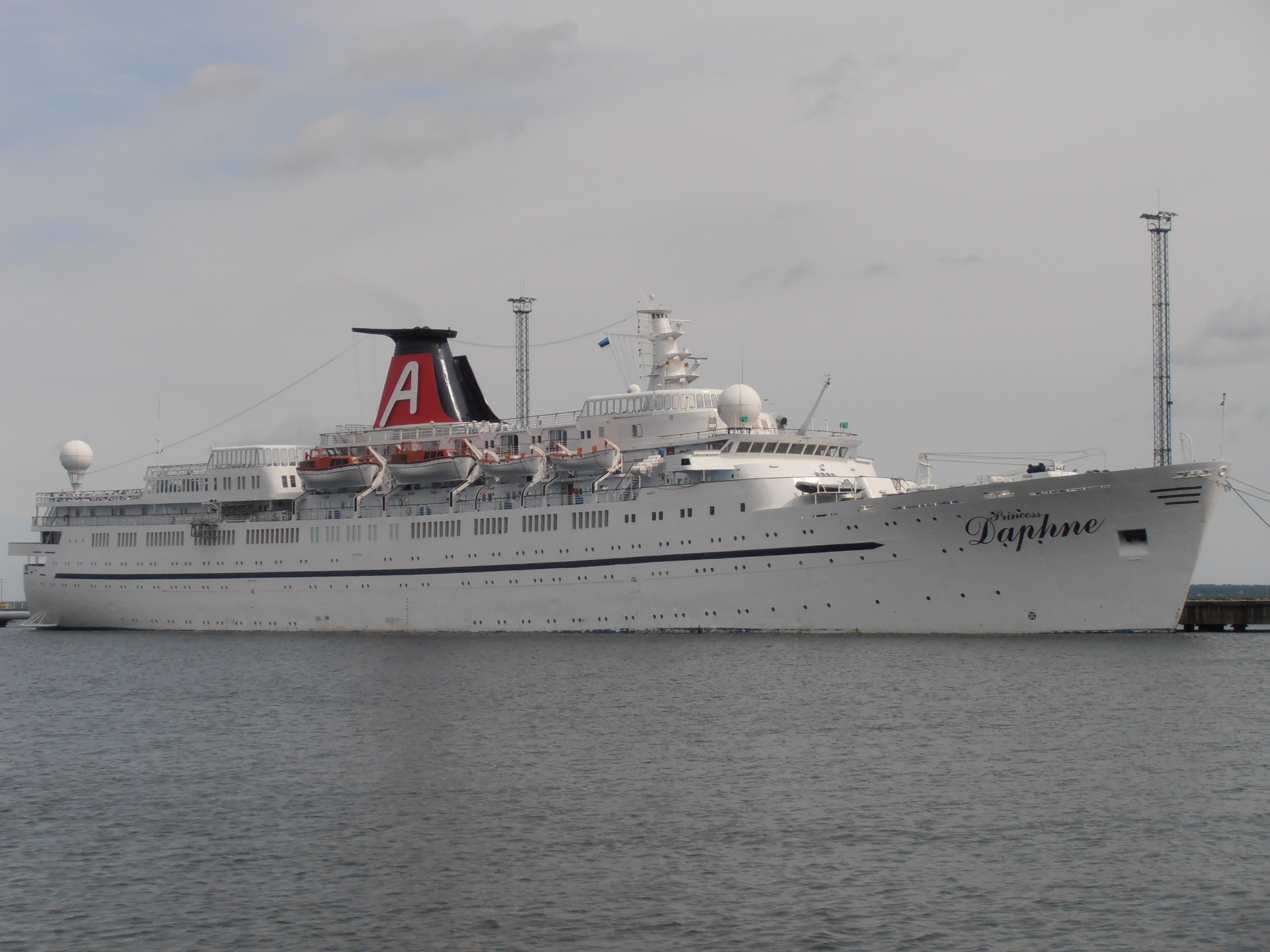
- Princess Daphne at Tallinn on 14 July 2012

History
- Name: Port Sydney (1954–1972); Akrotiri Express (1972–1974); Daphne (1974–1997); Switzerland (1997–2002); Ocean Monarch (2002–2005); Hellenic Aid (2005–2005); Ocean Monarch (2005–2008); Princess Daphne (2008–2014); Daphne (2014–2014)
- Owner: 1954–72 Port Line; 2008–2014 Golden Laurel Maritime
- Operator: Port Line (1954–1972); Delian Cruises (1975–1978); Lauro Lines (1978–1979); Costa Cruises (1979–1990); Prestige Cruises (1990-1995); Costa Cruises (1995–1997); Leisure Cruises (1997–2001); Majestic International Cruises (200?–0?); Page & Moy (200?–200?); Majestic International Cruises (200?–2007); Monarch Classic Cruises (2007–2008); Classic International Cruises (2008–2012)
- Port of registry: 1955–1972 (United Kingdom) London; 1972–1984 (Greece) Piraeus; 1984–1990 Panama; 1990–1996 (Liberia) Monrovia; 2006–2008: (Greece) Piraeus; 2008–2012: (Portugal) Madeira
- Builder: Swan, Hunter & Wigham Richardson
- Yard number: 1827
- Launched: 29 October 1954
- Completed: 1955
- Acquired: 1955
- Maiden voyage: 1955
- In service: 1955
- Out of service: 2012
- Identification: Call sign: CQSD; IMO number: 5282627; MMSI number: 255718000
- Fate: Scrapped at Alang, India in 2014
- Notes: Sister ship to MS Princess Danae

General characteristics
- Tonnage: As Port Sydney: 10,166 GRT, 5,585 NRT, 10,950 DWT; After 1975 conversion: 15,833 GRT
- Length: 162.3 m (532.5 ft)
- Beam: 21.34 m (70.0 ft)
- Decks: 10 (7 for passenger use)
- Installed power: 13,200 bhp
- Propulsion: 2 × screws; 2 × Doxford diesel engines
- Capacity: 530 passengers in 231 cabins

The MS Princess Daphne, formerly Ocean Monarch, Ocean Odyssey, Switzerland, Daphne, Akrotiri Express. was a medium-sized cruise ship. She had originally been the refrigerated cargo ship Port Sydney. Her sister ship was Princess Danae, which was built as Port Melbourne.

== History ==
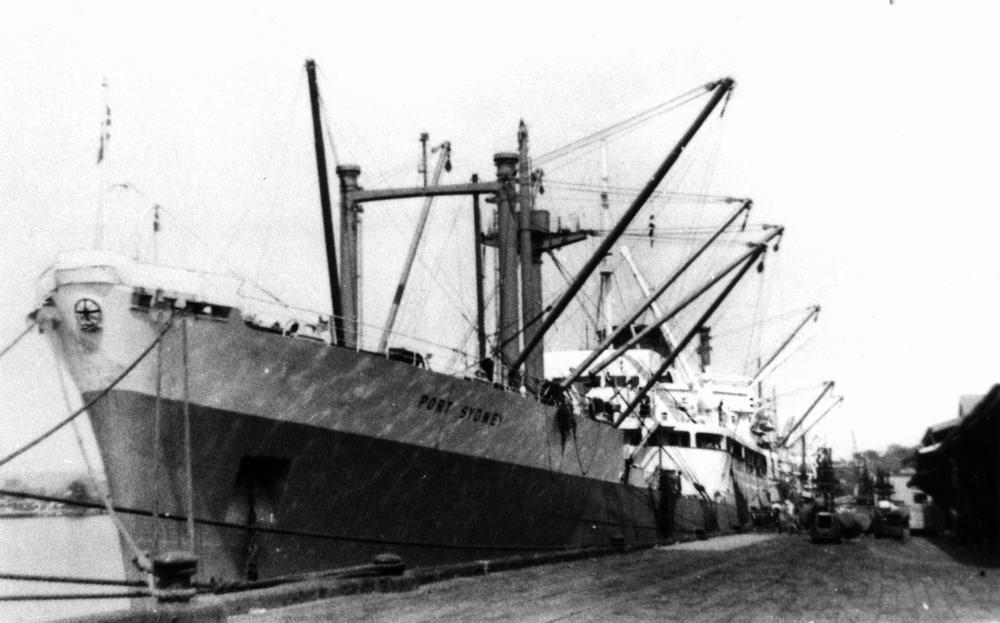
Port Sydney

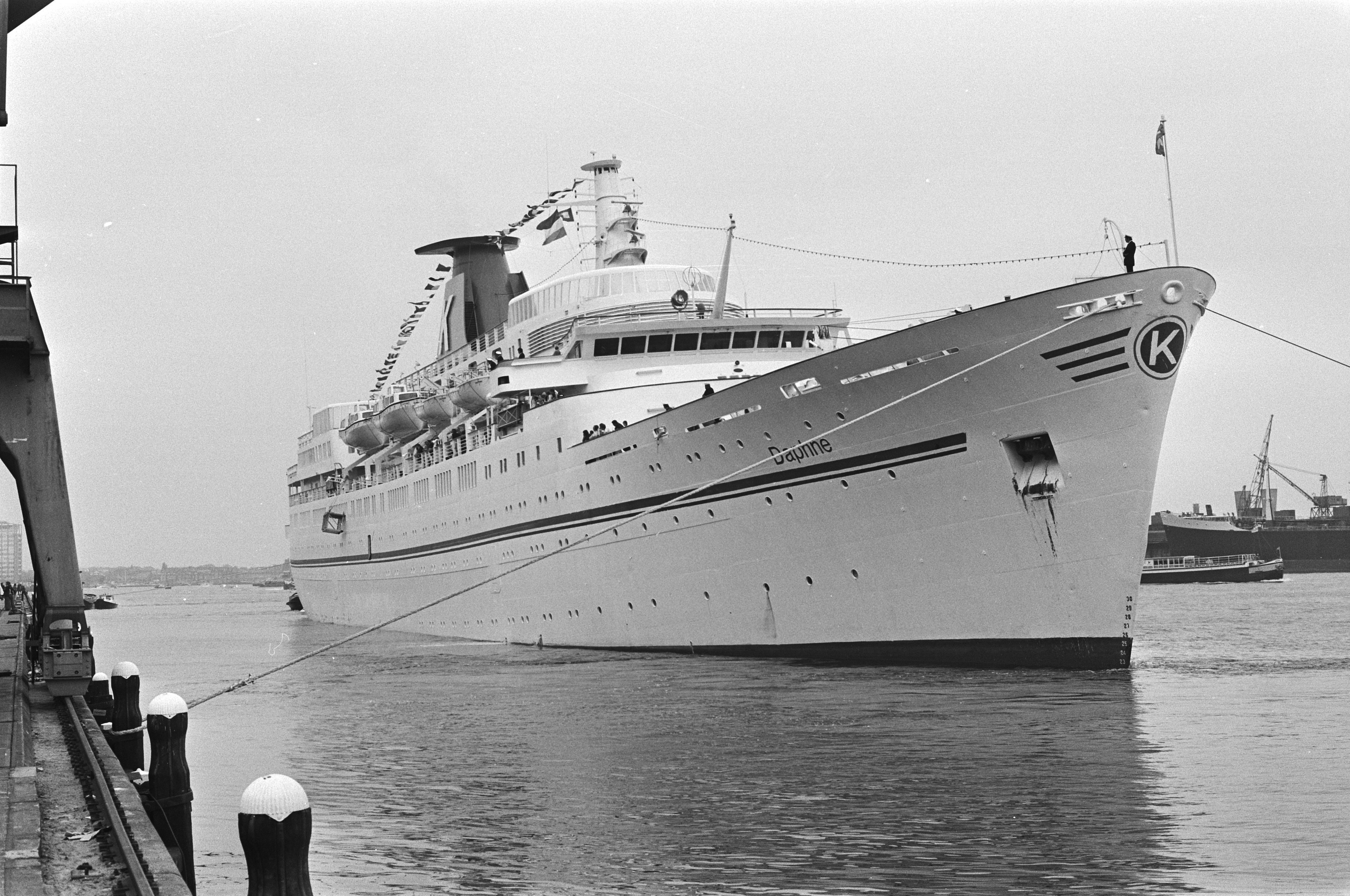
Daphne in Amsterdam, 1976

Swan, Hunter & Wigham Richardson built her in Wallsend, England as a refrigerated cargo ship for Port Line. She was launched on 29 October 1954 and completed in March 1955.

Between 1972 and 1974, she was converted into a cruise ship at Chalkis Shipyard, Piraeus, Greece.

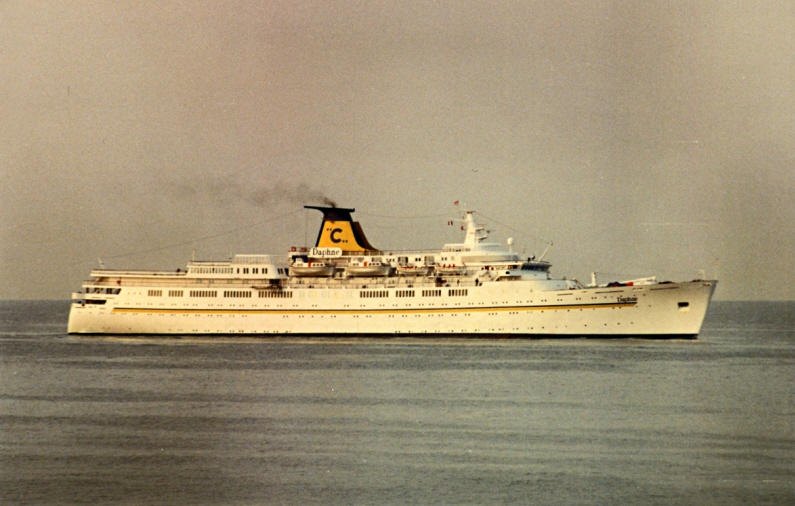
Daphne in 1990 or 1992

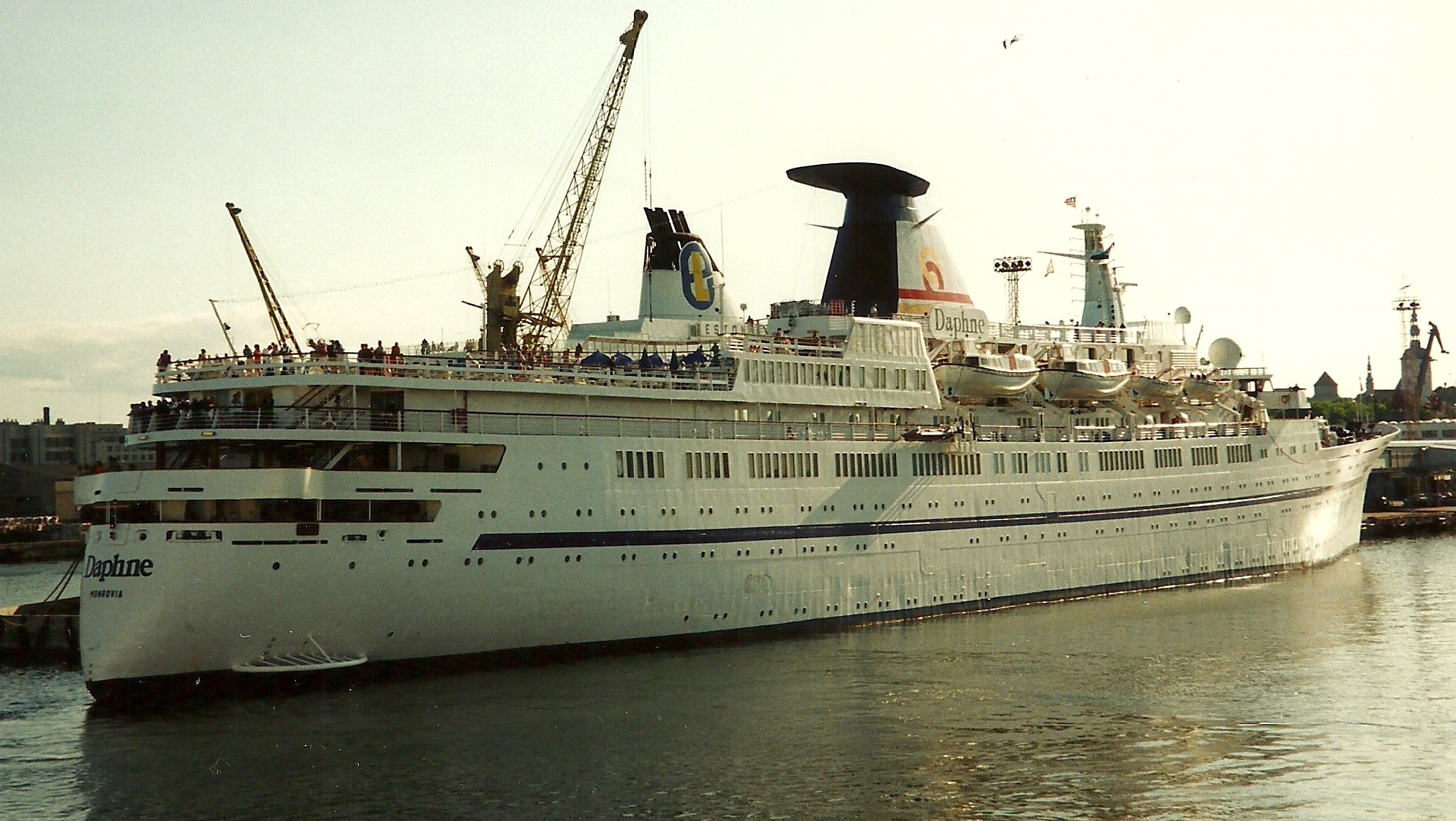
Daphne in 1993. Estonia can be seen in the back.

She served as a hospital ship in Sri Lanka in 2005.

It was announced on 14 June 2014 that the Princess Daphne had arrived in Alang, India under the name Daphne for scrapping, following a voyage from the Cretan port of Souda, where she was laid up in September 2012. She was given back to the Patimanios brothers by the bank following the sale of the assets of Classic International Cruises' fleet in 2013. In early 2014, rumors began to circulate saying she was to return to service under the "Classic International Cruises" banner. These rumors were proven false when it was announced that she was sold to Indian scrap merchants. She was beached at Alang by 1 July 2014 and scrapping commenced soon after.

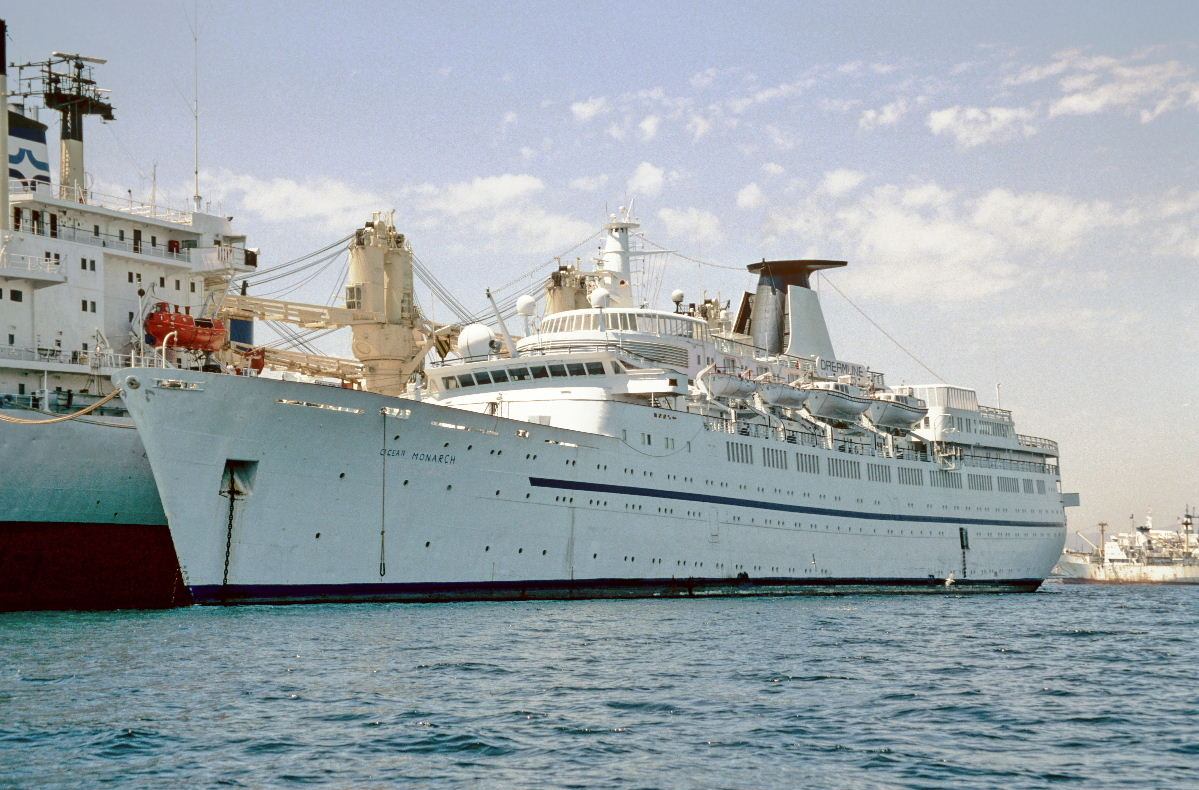
Ocean Monarch laid up in Elefsis, 2002

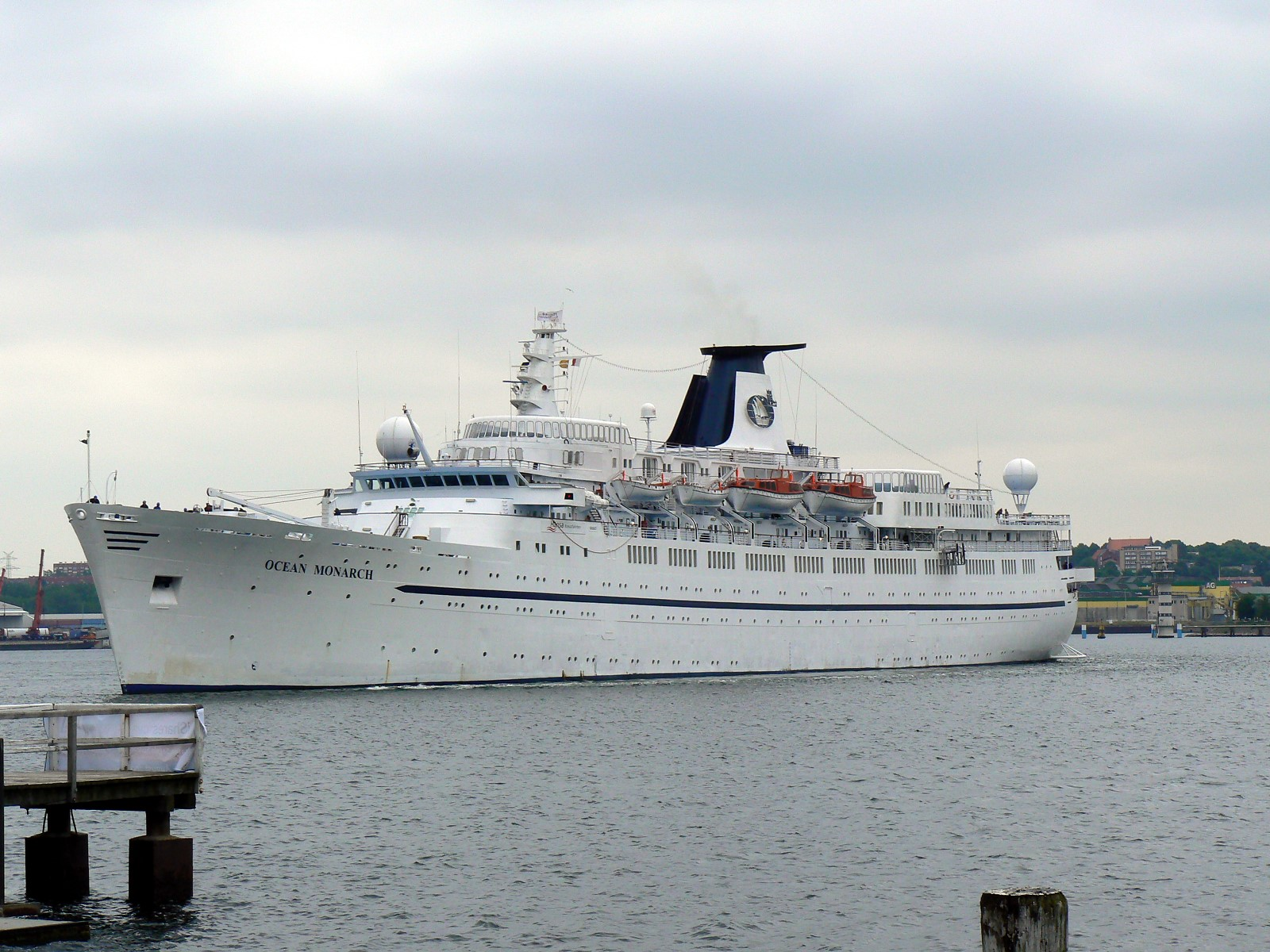
Ocean Monarch in Kiel, 2008
