= MS Princess Danae =

Princess Danae
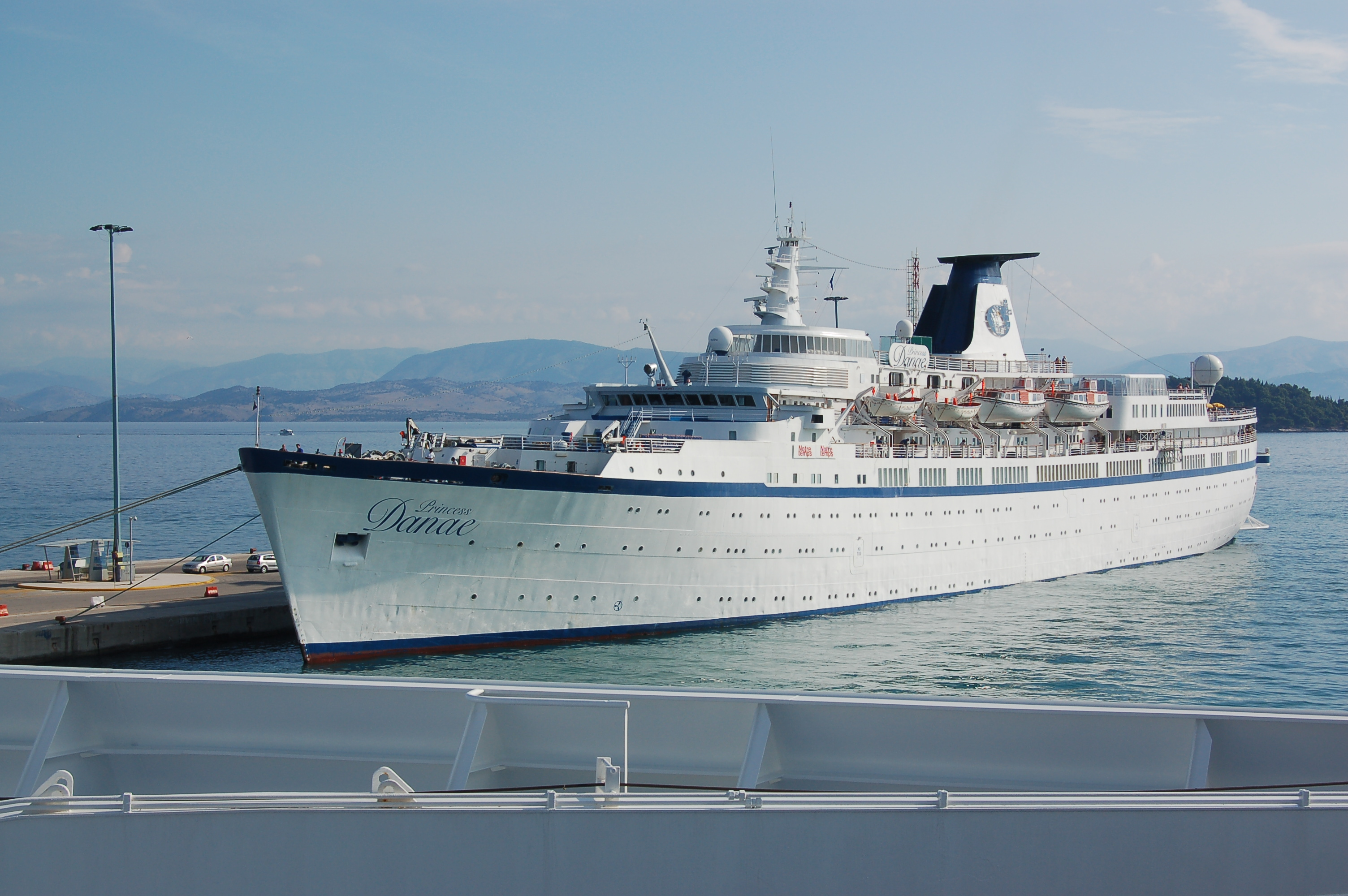
- MS Princess Danae in Corfu harbor, 2008.

History
- Name: Port Melbourne (1955-1972); Therisos Express (1972–1975); Danae (1975–1992); Starlight Express (1992–1994); Baltica (1994–1996); Princess Danae (1996–2013); Lisboa (2013–2015)
- Namesake: Lisbon (Lisboa in Portuguese)
- Owner: Portuscale Cruises
- Operator: Port Line (1955–1972); Delian Cruises (1975–1979); Costa Cruises (1979–1990); Prestige Cruises (1990–1992); Classic International Cruises (1996–2012); Portuscale Cruises (2013–2013); Unknown French Operator (2015–2015)
- Port of registry: 1955–1972: London, United Kingdom; 1994–2001: Panama, Panama; 2001–2015: Madeira, Portugal
- Builder: Harland and Wolff
- Launched: 10 March 1955
- Christened: 1955
- Completed: 1955
- Maiden voyage: 1955
- In service: 1955
- Out of service: 2015
- Identification: IMO number: 5282483; MMSI number: 255987000; Callsign: CQTK
- Fate: Scrapped at Aliağa, Turkey in 2015.

General characteristics
- Tonnage: 16531 t
- Length: 162.30 m
- Beam: 21.34 m
- Draught: 7.65 m
- Decks: 8
- Installed power: 9708 kw
- Propulsion: 2 × Wallsend-Doxford 6 cylinder Diesel
- Speed: 15.5 kn
- Capacity: 670 passengers

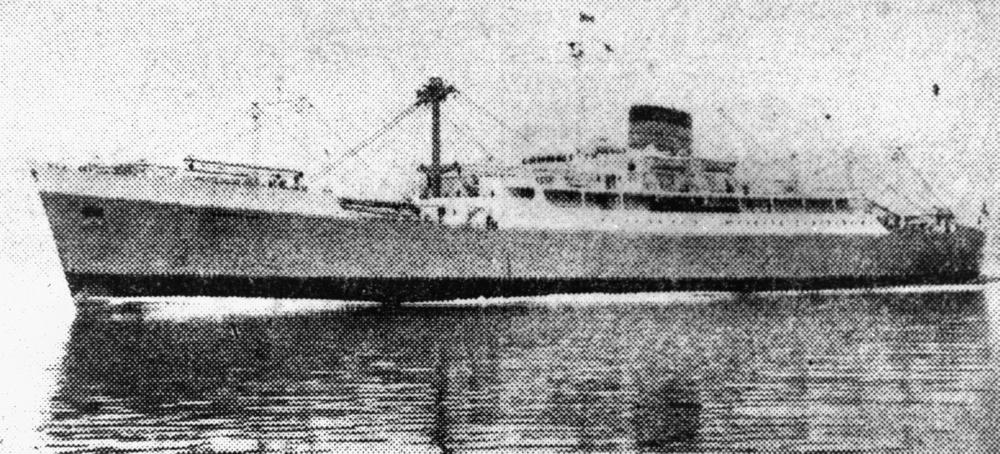
Port Melbourne

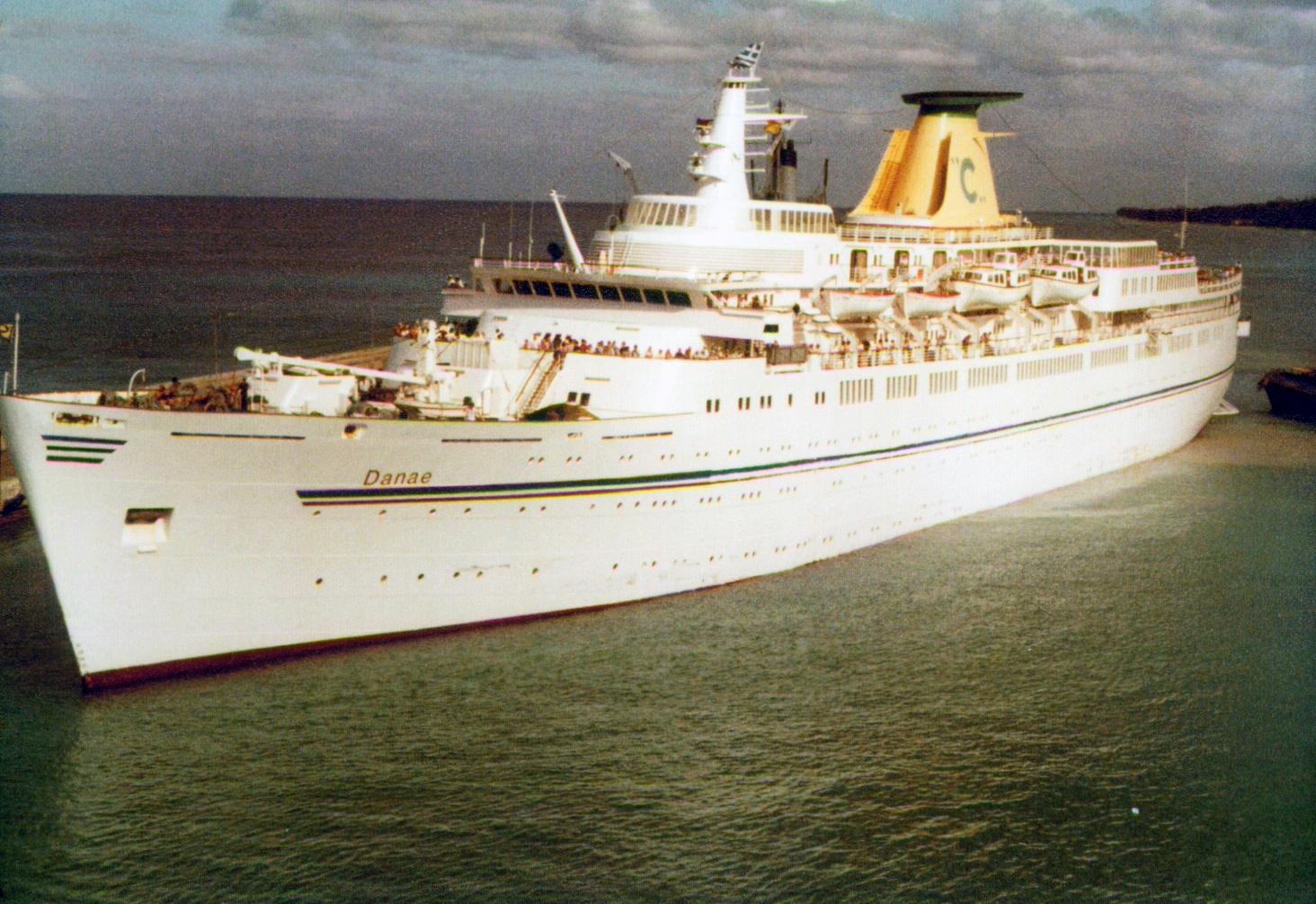
Costa Danae

The MS Princess Danae was a cruise liner. The ship was designed by Harland & Wolff as a freighter in Belfast built and ran in 1954 as Port Melbourne, a fast cargo liner for Port Line's UK-Australia express service. She was planned to be rebuilt as a car ferry, the Therisos Express, but instead became the cruise ship Danae. In later years, she was named Starlight Express, Baltica, and then Princess Danae.

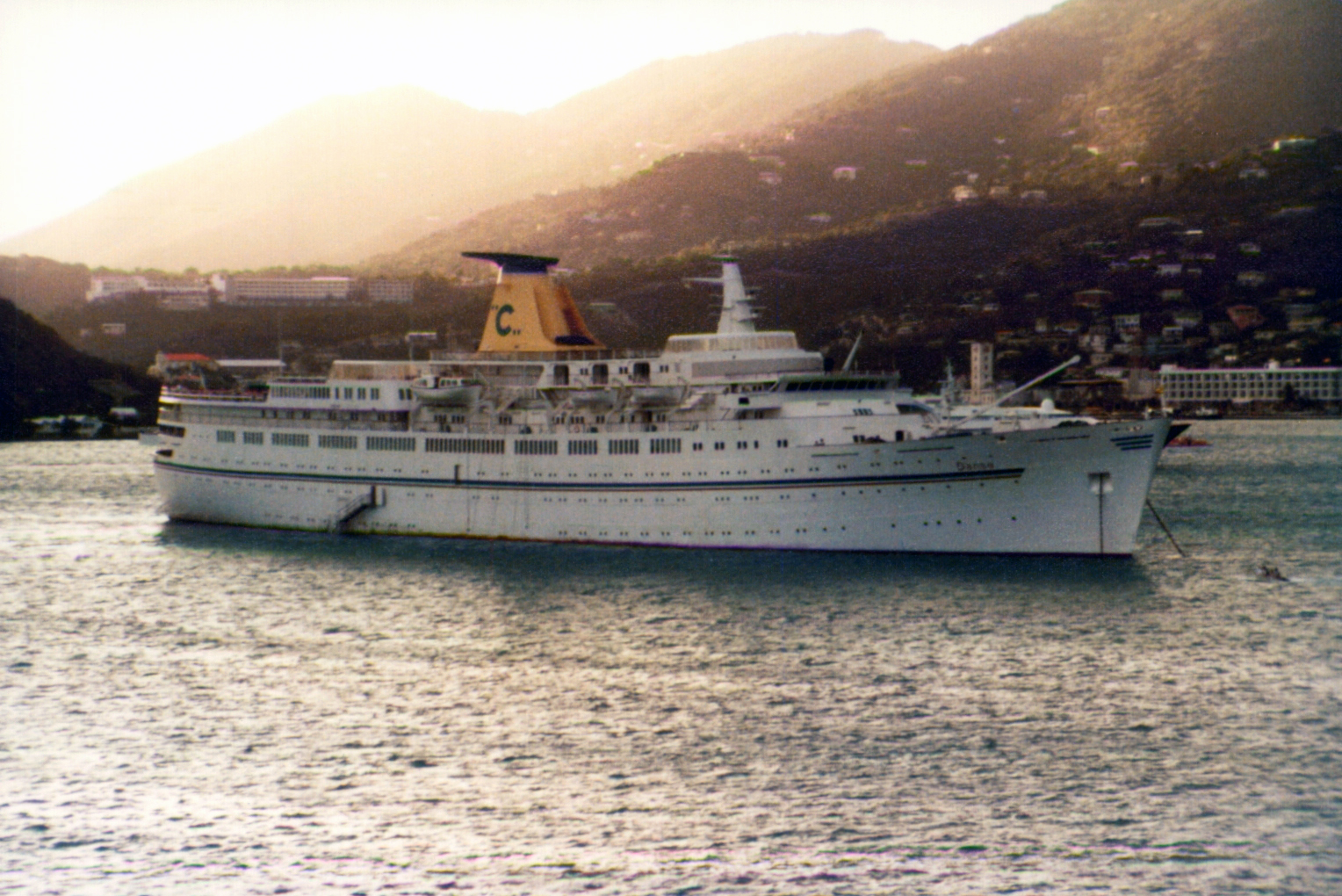
Costa Danae in 1982

From 1994 until 2012, the ship was operated by Classic International Cruises as the Princess Danae. In late summer of 2012, the ship was detained in Dublin, Ireland for the non-payment of a fuel bill. Early in 2013, she was bought by the recently created Portuguese cruise company Portuscale Cruises and renamed Lisboa. She was scrapped at Aliağa on 24 July 2015.

Her sister ship was the Princess Daphne, built as Port Sydney.
