= MV Funchal =

Ocean liner (launched 1961)

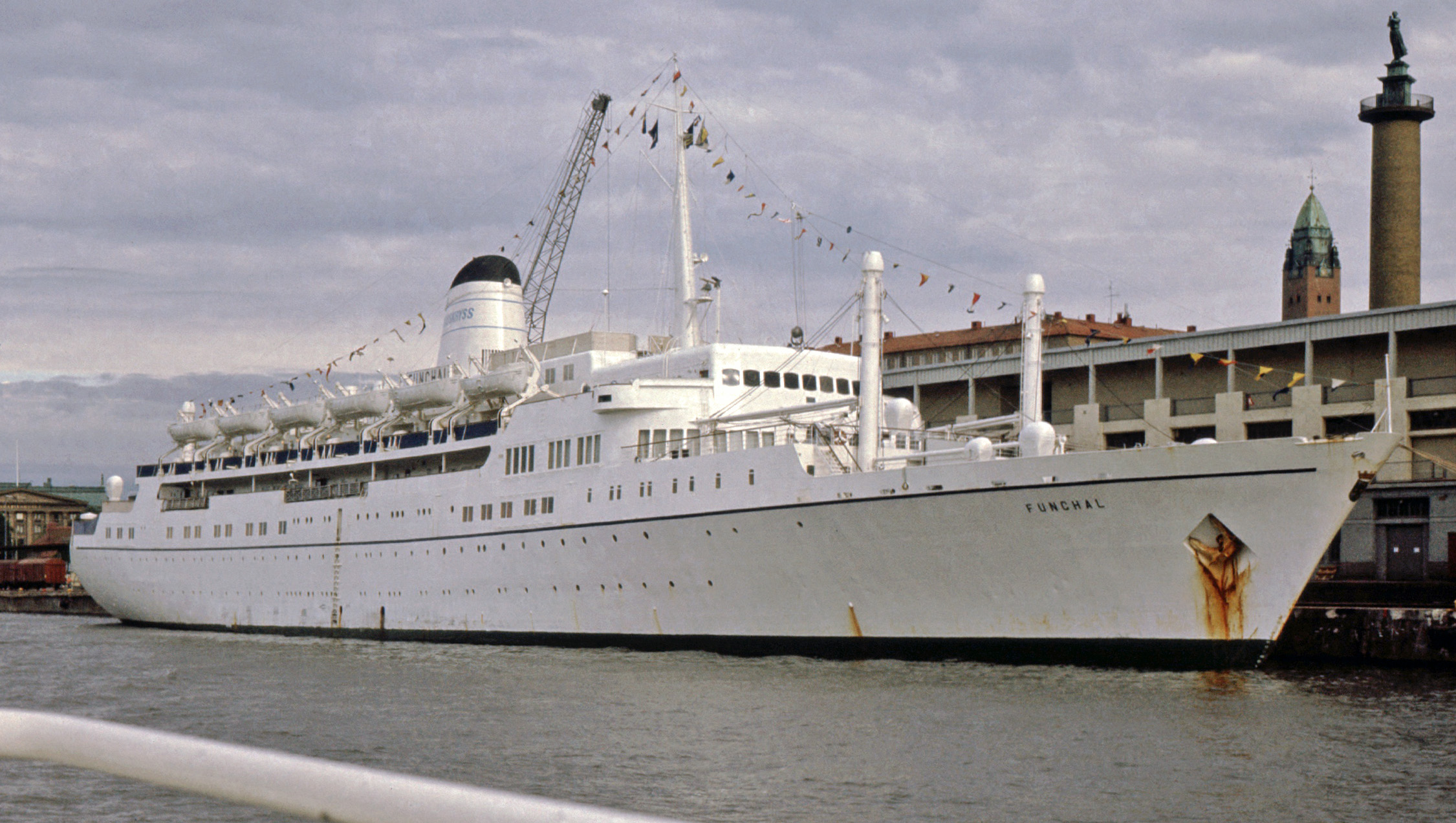
- MV Funchal in Gothenburg, July 1976

History

Portugal
- Name: Funchal
- Namesake: Funchal
- Operator: Empresa Insulana de Navegação
- Port of registry: Lisbon
- Builder: Helsingør Skibsværft A/S
- Yard number: 353
- Launched: 10 February 1961
- Maiden voyage: 4 November 1961
- In service: 1961
- Out of service: 1974
- Refit: 1972
- Home port: Lisbon
- Identification: Call sign: CSBM; IMO number: 5124162; MMSI number: 255971000

Portugal
- Name: Funchal
- Operator: CTM - Companhia Portuguesa de Transportes Marítimos
- Port of registry: Lisbon
- In service: 1974
- Out of service: 1985
- Refit: 1972
- Home port: Lisbon

Portugal
- Name: Funchal
- Owner: G. Warwick Co. Inc
- Operator: Classic International Cruises
- Port of registry: 1985–2001: Panama City, Panama; 2001 onwards: Madeira, Portugal
- In service: 1985
- Out of service: 2011
- Fate: Transferred to Portuscale Cruises in 2013

Portugal
- Name: Funchal
- Owner: Brock Pierce
- Port of registry: Madeira, Portugal
- In service: 2013
- Out of service: 2015
- Refit: 2013, 2021
- Home port: Lisbon
- Identification: Call sign: CSBM; IMO number: 5124162; MMSI number: 255971000
- Status: Sold to Greek Owner

General characteristics
- Type: Ocean liner
- Tonnage: 9,563 GT
- Length: 152.6 m (501 ft)
- Beam: 19.05 m (62.5 ft)
- Depth: 6.18 m (20.3 ft)
- Decks: 6
- Speed: 16 knots (30 km/h; 18 mph)
- Capacity: 524 passengers
- Crew: 155

MV Funchal is a Portuguese ocean liner that was built in 1961.

== Construction and configuration ==
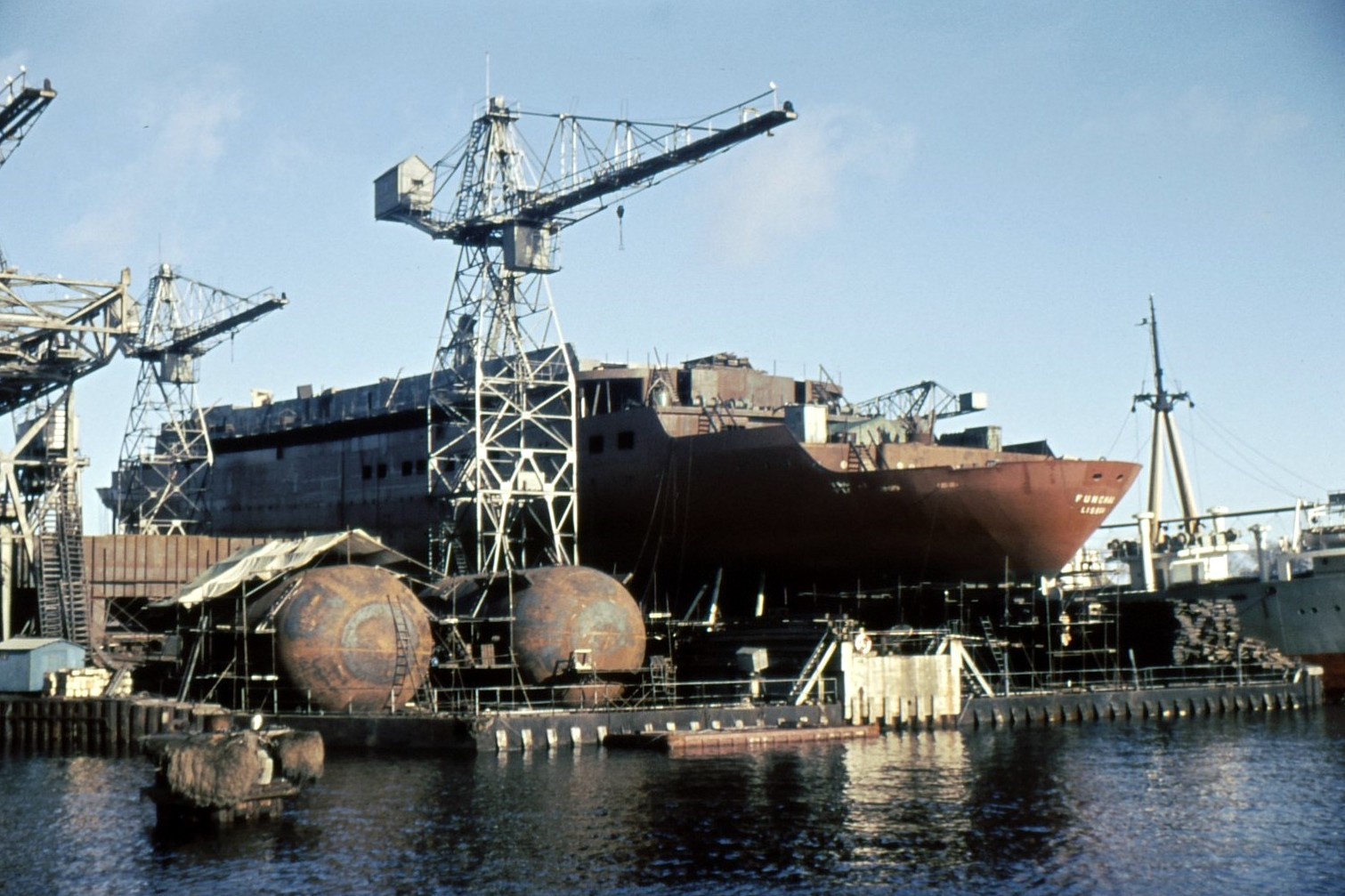
Funchal being built at Helsingor, February 5, 1961

The ship was built in 1961, under the guidance of the Portuguese naval engineer Rogério d'Oliveira. Funchal is an ocean liner with a classic profile and interiors.

The ship's features include stabilisation, air-conditioning, three lifts, a main show lounge (Ilha Verde), piano bar (Porto Bar), club room, library, card room, lido bar, shop, photo shop, medical centre, excursion office, and reception with exchange facilities.

== Early service ==
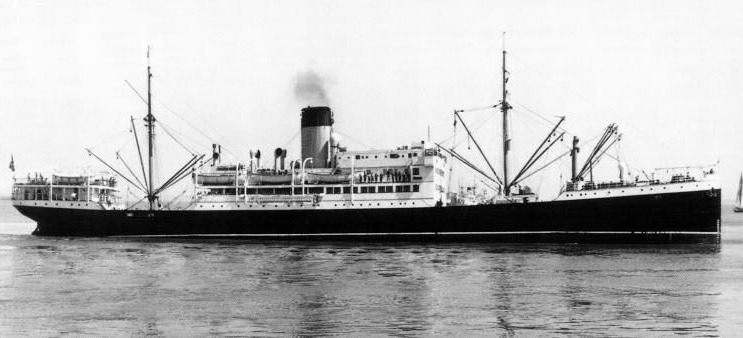
The steamship Lima

In the late 1950s Portuguese shipping company Empresa Insulana de Navegação began to plan a running-mate for its popular but aging steamship Lima on the Lisbon – Madeira route. The new ship was laid down in July 1960, and was launched as Funchal (after the capital of Madeira) on February 10, 1961. She was delivered to Insulana de Navegação in October, and began her maiden voyage from Lisbon to Madeira via Ponta Delgada, Azores on November 4.

From 1961 to 1972 Funchal worked the Lisbon – Azores – Madeira route consistently, aside from periodic charters by the Portuguese government to act as the country's presidential yacht for both recreational and official functions, including state visits to Brazil in 1968 and 1972 (on the latter trip, repatriating the ashes of Brazil's first Emperor, Pedro I).

However, the ship's boilers had been problematic since her launch, with frequent breakdowns and unplanned maintenance periods, and on a 1972 trip from Lisbon to Rio de Janeiro carrying President Américo Tomás, Funchal broke down in mid-Atlantic, and limped into Rio two days late after emergency repairs.

In the aftermath of the boiler failure, Empresa Insulana de Navegação sent Funchal to Nederlandsche Dok en Scheepsbouw Maatschappij NV in Amsterdam, Netherlands in late 1972, where her original boilers and Parsons turbines were removed and replaced with a pair of 9-cylinder Werkspoor diesel engines, making a total of 10,000 hp. The company took the opportunity to also rebuild Funchal as a single-class cruise ship. Tourist A and B cabins were mostly rebuilt, to enable a greater share of rooms with private bathrooms, and cargo hold space was converted into additional cabins. Upon re-delivery in May 1973, Funchal now carried 465 passengers in one class, and had a top speed of just 18 knots, 16 knots cruising, slower, but more reliable and efficient.

After making a few cruises with her original black hull, Funchal was repainted white in the spring of 1973. From 1973 to 1974, her routes varied, sailing from Dover, United Kingdom and Zeebrugge, Belgium down to the Azores, Madeira, the Canary Islands, and Cape Verde during the summer months, shifting to Rio de Janeiro for cruises along the South American coast during the winter. By this point, Funchal's owners were struggling financially, and, in early 1974, merged with their larger counterpart, Companhia Colonial de Navegação, to create Companhia Portuguesa de Transportes Marítimos (CPTM), with Funchal becoming part of the combined fleet. Later in 1974, following the revolution that toppled the Estado Novo regime, CPTM was nationalized by the new government.

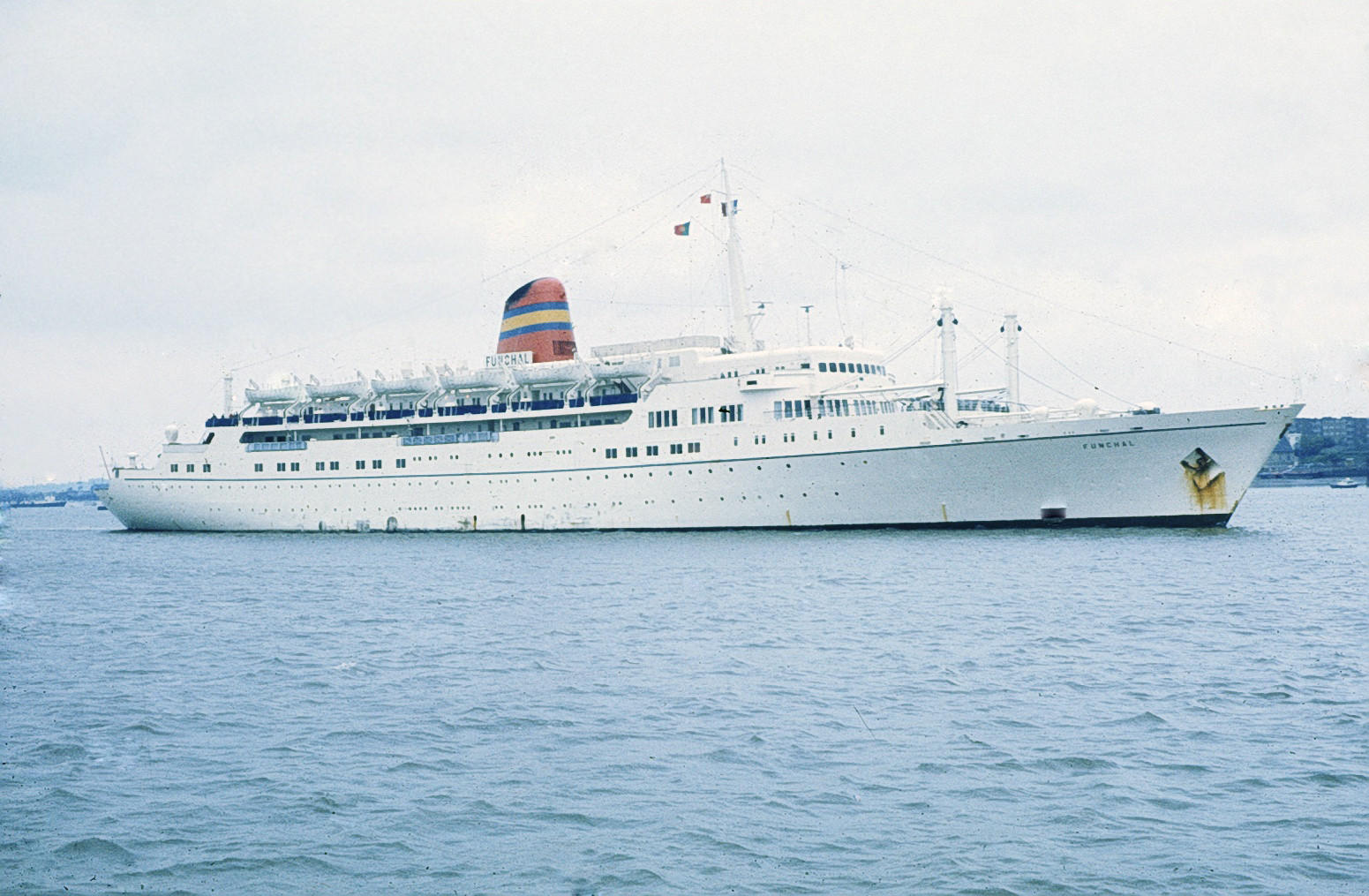
Funchal in Tilbury, 1977

In 1976 CPTM placed Funchal under long-term charter to Greek businessman Georgios Potamianos, a member of the family that also controlled Epirotiki Lines (later known as Royal Olympic / Olympia Cruise Lines). Potamianos formed Arcalia Shipping Company to manage and market the ship, basing Funchal in Harwich, United Kingdom during the summer, running cruises around the Baltic Sea and Norwegian fjords, moving to Rio de Janeiro in the winter.

== Service with Classic International Cruises ==
Funchal was the first vessel to join the Classic International Cruises fleet in 1984, and under that flag successfully served the British cruise market for over 20 years, carrying thousands of passengers.

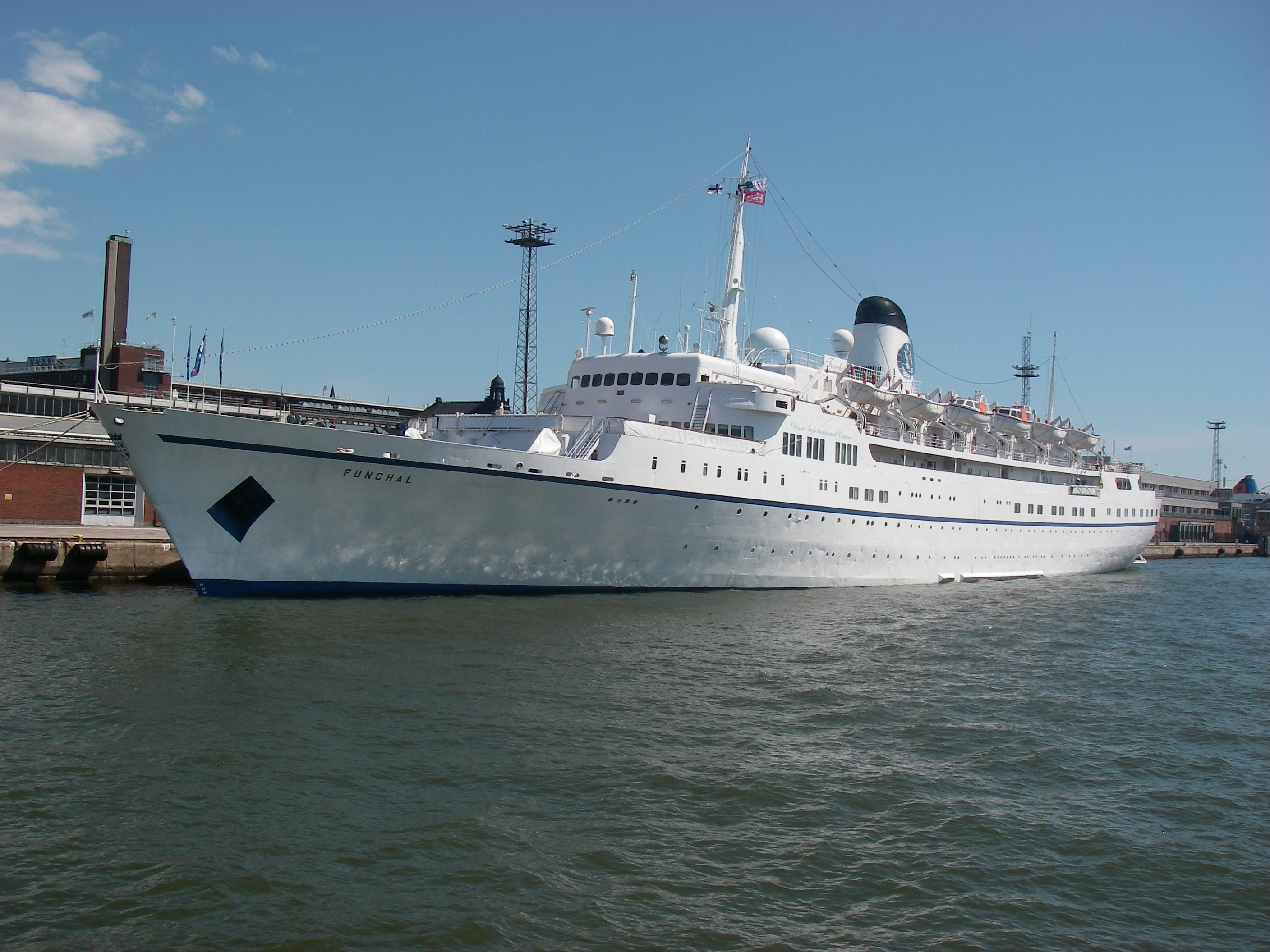
Funchal in Helsinki, June 2009

Having undergone extensive work in 2010, to comply with SOLAS 2010, Funchal went to a Lisbon Shipyard in February 2011 for a lengthy refit, which included changes to its power plant as well as passenger and crew cabins and public lounges. The idea was to make the ship fit for service for at least another ten years. In November 2011, she completed 50 years of service, always under the same name. However, in 2012, work stopped towards April with only 20% of the required work completed. Following Classic International Cruises' liquidation, in December 2012, the ship faced the threat of being sold for scrap.

== Service with Portuscale Cruises ==
In early 2013 a Portuguese entrepreneur Rui Alegre purchased Funchal, as well as Princess Danae, Arion and Athena, to serve the newly-formed Portuscale Cruises. During 2013, Funchal was extensively refurbished in Lisbon's Naval Rocha shipyards, being upgraded to a four-star vessel, at a cost of about 10 million euros. In the refurbishment, the ship's hull was re-painted black, its original colour.

On 1 August 2013 the refurbished Funchal was re-instated in the presence of prime minister Passos Coelho. In early August 2013, the ship left drydock in Lisbon, Portugal and, on 27 August 2013, arrived in Gothenburg, Sweden, to restart her cruising career.

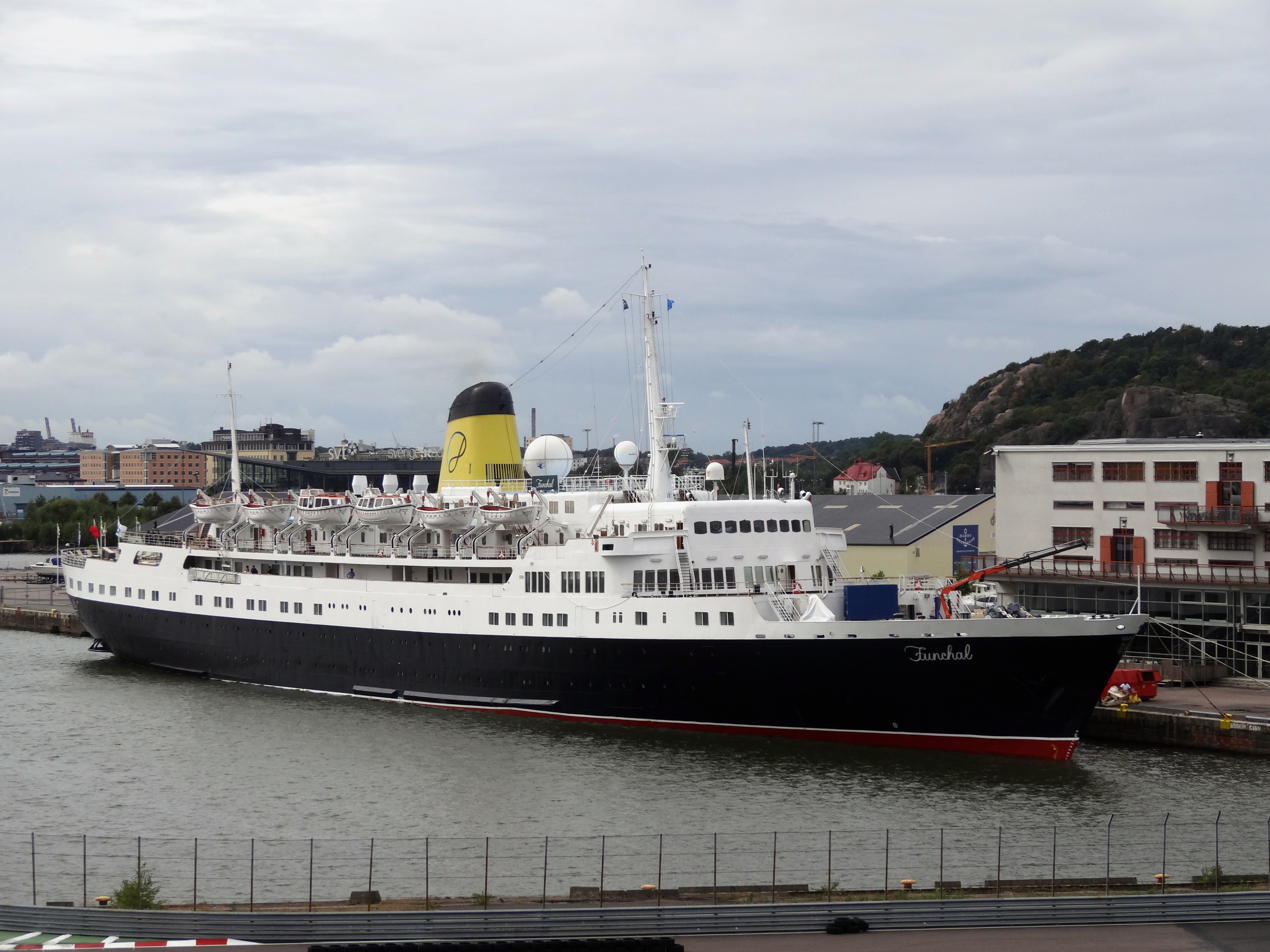
Funchal in Gothenburg on August 30, 2013

On 28 August 2013 Funchal was detained at Gothenburg. The cruise ship was fully laden with passengers but was not allowed to leave. According to some Swedish press accounts, many safety issues were found. In a press release, the Portuscale Cruise CEO denied the existence of safety issues, saying that the issues were related to the malfunctioning of two watertight doors and one sprinkler station, issues that had already been detected by the crew, who had informed the Swedish Port State Control authorities.

On 3 September 2013, with the issues resolved, and all inspections made and certifications granted, Funchal left Gothenburg harbour and restarted her cruise, heading to Scotland.

== Signature Living ==
On 5 December 2018 Funchal was sold at auction in Lisbon for €3.1 million. The buyers were named as Signature Living, a UK-based hotel group who intended to convert the ship to a party hotel to travel from Liverpool to the Mediterranean. However, payment was not made and the ship remained laid up in Lisbon. According to industry sources, the Funchal was to be towed to Liverpool as soon as new owners Signature Living made the final payment on the vessel. However, on 30 June 2020, Signature Living entered administration with the administrators arranging for the disposal of Funchal. She thus remained moored in Lisbon.

== Plan for conversion into a hotel ==
In December 2020, while the Funchal was still laid up in Lisbon, the ship was put up for auction by sealed tender. The ship was purchased by cryptocurrency billionaire Brock Pierce and Teamson Ltda., a company associated to Pierce who paid US$1.9 million/€1.6 million for the ship, and planned to convert it into a 200-room, 5 star hotel at Yard Naval da Rocha Conde de Óbidos. The costs to refurbish the ship was estimated to be US$6.4 million/€5.5 million. Pierce also bought the 75 year-old Astoria, docked in Rotterdam (currently being scrapped in Belgium), which was also to be transferred to Lisbon for refurbishing and naval certificates, with eventual plans to travel to Funchal, Madeira.

Work appeared to be slow. In September 2021, the ship was the scene of a fire incident, which resulted in 20 fire crews rushing to the scene. One worker suffered minor smoke inhalation injuries.

== Auction ==
In September 2026, the Funchal was put up for auction following the insolvency of Teamson Ltda. On 9 October 2026, it was announced that the Funchal had been sold to Greek interests who specialize in scrapping and ship repairs.

== External links and further reading ==
- MarineTraffic: Funchal - Current position of RV Funchal, recent port calls and live map view.
- MV Funchal ship profile - Portuscale Cruises profile for MV Funchal, showing deck plans and information about the public areas of the ship.
- ssMaritime: SS Funchal - Early history of Funchal.
