= Seabourn Quest =

Cruise ship built in 2010

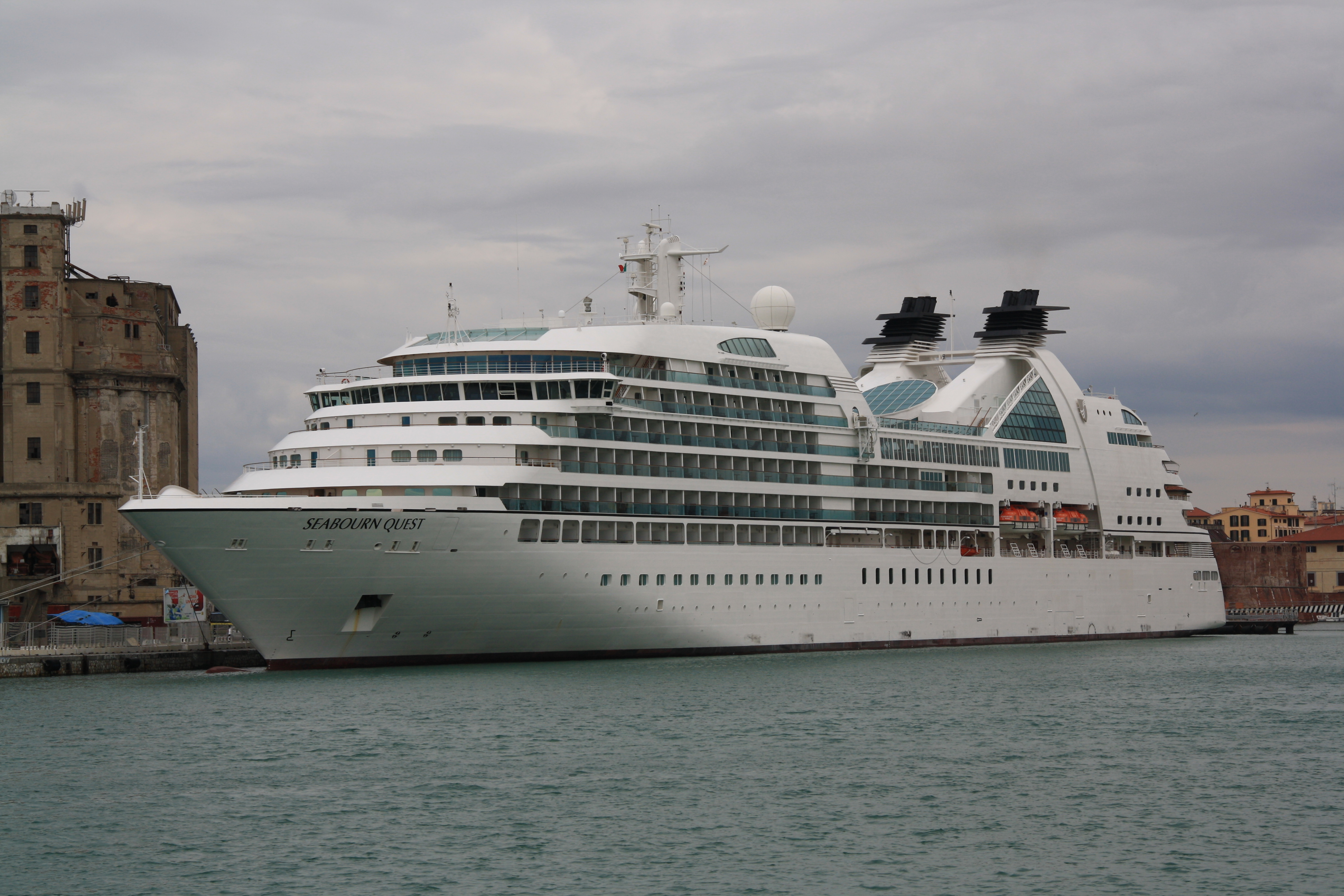
- Seabourn Quest

History
- Name: Seabourn Quest
- Owner: Seabourn Cruise Line
- Port of registry: Nassau, Bahamas
- Builder: T. Mariotti, Genoa, Italy
- Yard number: 64
- Christened: 20 June 2011
- Acquired: 31 May 2011
- Maiden voyage: 20 June 2011
- In service: June 20, 2011-present
- Identification: Call sign: C6YZ5; IMO number: 9483126; MMSI number: 311038900
- Status: In service after May 13–June 2, 2013 refit.

General characteristics
- Class & type: Seabourn Odyssey class
- Type: Cruise ship
- Tonnage: 32,346 GT (2011-2013)32,348 GT (2013-onwards)
- Length: 198.15 m (650 ft 1 in) (o/a); 169.2 m (555 ft 1 in) (p/p)
- Beam: 25.6 m (84 ft 0 in)
- Draught: 6.5 m (21 ft 4 in)
- Decks: 11
- Installed power: 4 × Wärtsilä 12V32; 23,040 kW (30,900 hp) (combined)
- Propulsion: 2 × 7.5 MW SAM/VEM electric motors; two shafts with controllable pitch propellers
- Speed: 19.0 knots (35.2 km/h; 21.9 mph) (service); 25.5 knots (47.2 km/h; 29.3 mph) (maximum)
- Capacity: 450 passengers
- Crew: 335

Seabourn Quest is a luxury cruise ship in Seabourn Cruise Line. It was constructed by Italian shipbuilder T. Mariotti. The vessel entered service in June 2011.

== Design and construction ==
T. Mariotti constructed the ship at their shipyard in Genoa, Italy. Seabourn Quest was built using same design as her preceding sister ships, the Seabourn Odyssey and Seabourn Sojourn. They are among the smallest cruise ships in operation with any major cruise company. Together, the three sister ships tripled the passenger capacity of the cruise line.

The ship's name was chosen through a competition inviting submissions from the public between September and December 2009. From 2,100 submissions, "Quest" (with 120 suggestions) was selected by the company.

== 2013 Refit ==
From May 13, 2013, to June 2, 2013, Seabourn Quest was drydocked for a refit at the T. Mariotti shipyard in Genoa, Italy. Work on the ship included 2 new additional cranes in outdoor spaces aft deck 6, 4 additional Zodiac cradles, rearrangement of incinerator room and increasing of retention capacity, installation of a new water ballast treatment system in engine room and minor mechanical and piping works in engine room and drydock. Additional work included the ship's marina being refitted to accommodate the Zodiac inflatables that will be used in Seabourn's upcoming Antarctica cruises along with general upgrades and additions to the crew area that have already been introduced on the Seabourn Odyssey and Seabourn Sojourn. This refit had no implications for the vessel's ice class. The refit involved only minor modifications to accommodate the Zodiacs.
