= Seabourn Venture =

Cruise ship

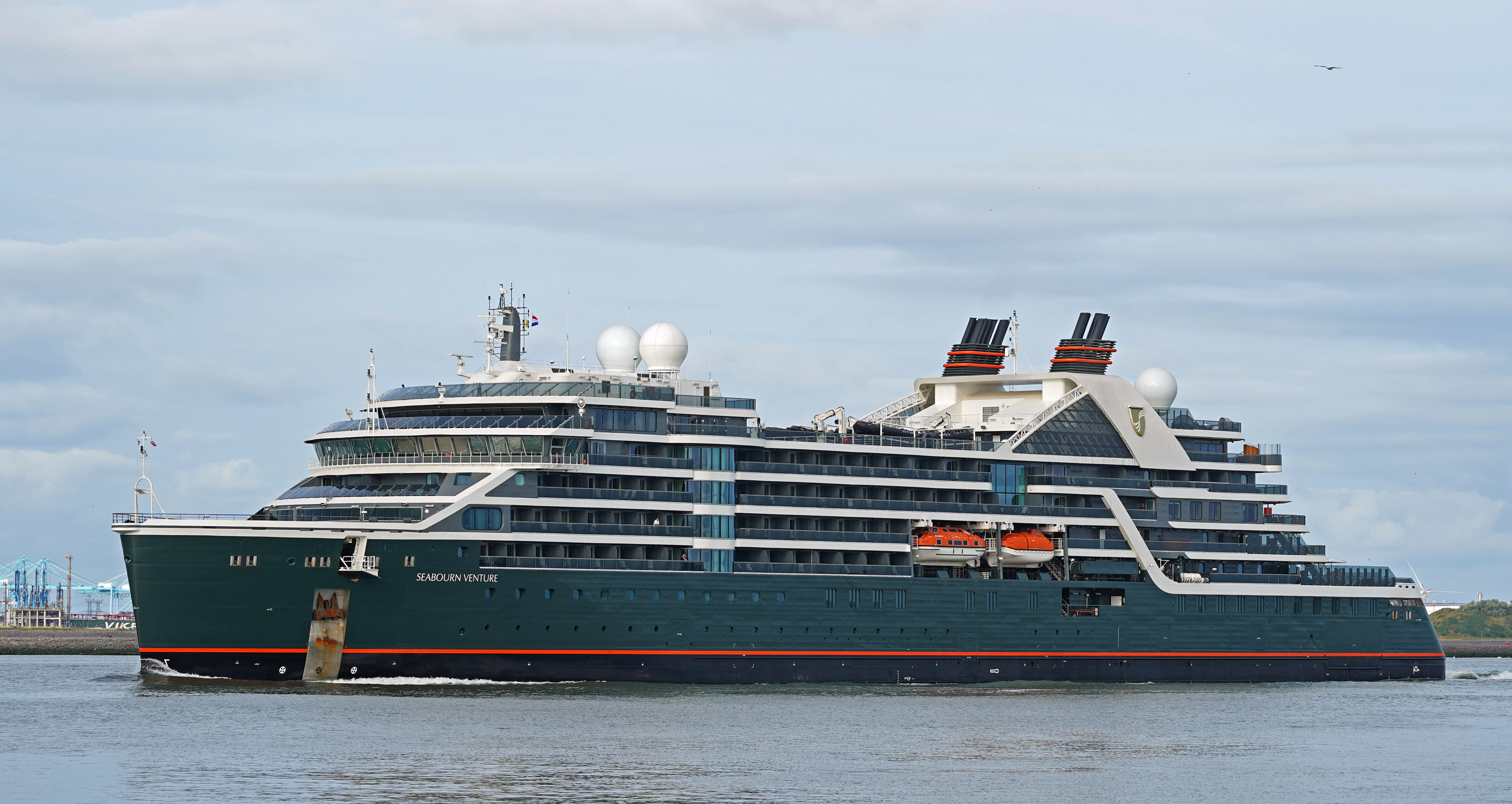

History
- Name: Seabourn Venture
- Owner: Carnival Corporation
- Operator: Seabourn Cruise Line
- Port of registry: Nassau, Bahamas
- Builder: T. Mariotti
- Laid down: 2019
- Launched: 2021
- Completed: 2022
- Identification: IMO number: 9862023; MMSI number: 311000930

General characteristics
- Tonnage: 23,000 GT
- Length: 172 m (564 ft 4 in)
- Beam: 24 m (78 ft 9 in)
- Ice class: PC-6 Polar Class
- Capacity: 264 passengers

Seabourn Venture is an ultra-luxury expedition cruise ship operated by Seabourn Cruise Line. The ship's hull was built by the CIMAR Shipyard in San Giorgio di Nogaro and outfitted at T. Mariotti in Genoa. Its keel was laid in December 2019 and in March 2021 the hull was towed to Genoa to be completed. Sea trials began in April 2022 and the ship was delivered to Seabourn Cruise Line on 28 June 2022 in Genoa. It is Carnival Corporation's first expedition cruise ship.

== Ship features ==
Seabourn Venture can carry 264 passengers in 132 cabins.

- The ship was built to the PC6 Polar Class standard which enables it to operate in Antarctica and the Arctic during Summer and Autumn.
- The ship has two submarines onboard which can each carry six passengers and a pilot.
- The ship has 24 Zodiac RIBs.

== Operational history ==
The ship's maiden voyage begun on July 27, 2022, beginning in Tromsø, Norway and going to the Arctic Sea and Svalbard Archipelago. The ship's homeport is Ushuaia, Argentina, from where it carries out cruise expeditions of varying length to Antarctica, the Falkland Islands and South Georgia. In March and April 2023 Seabourn Cruises plans to use the ship for expeditions to the Amazon in Brazil.

== See also ==
- MS Fridtjof Nansen
- MS Xpedition
- National Geographic Orion
- Silver Endeavour
- Viking Octantis
- Celebrity Flora

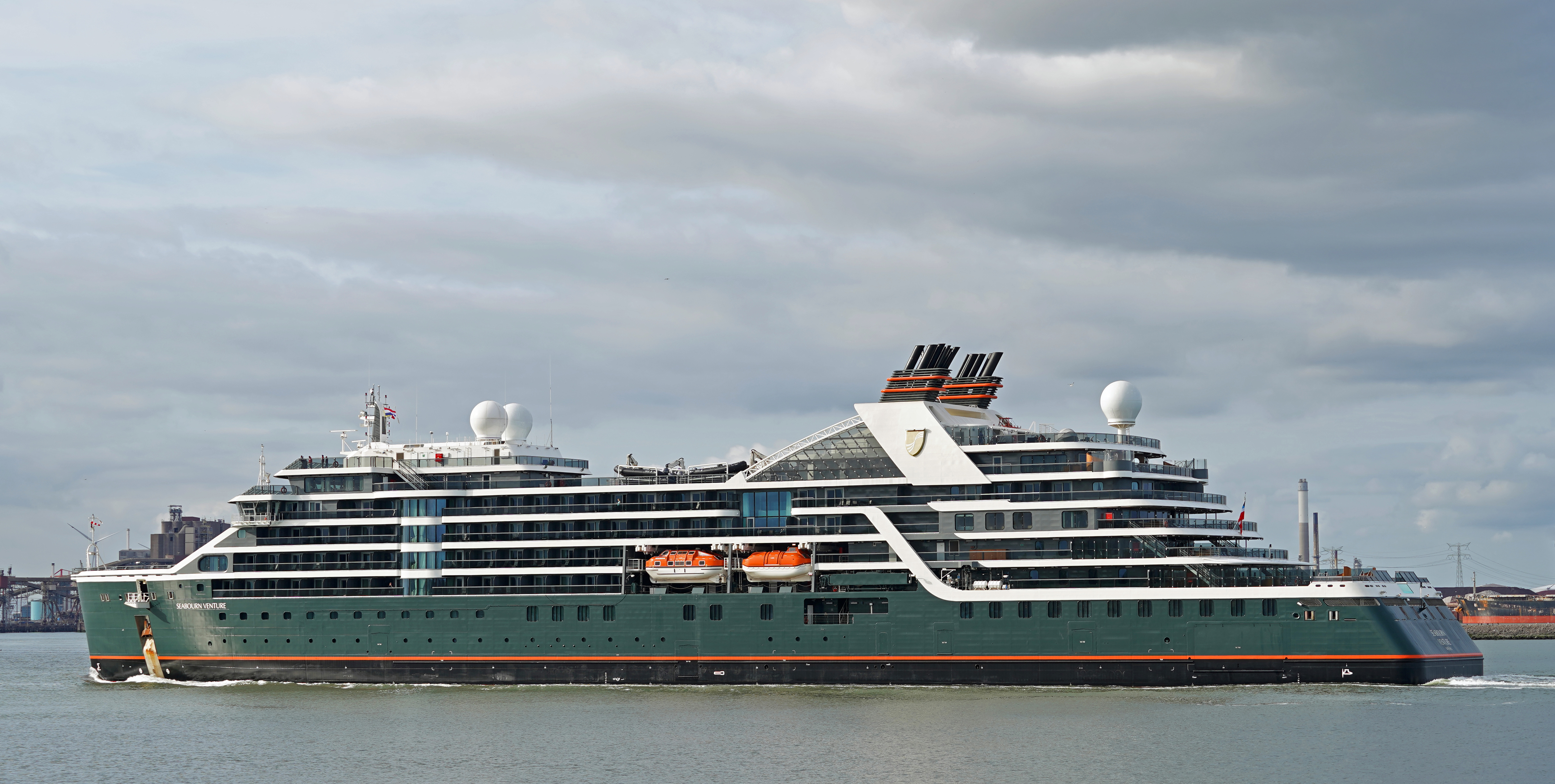
Seabourne Venture at Hoek van Holland
