= T. Mariotti =

Italian Shipbuilder

Coordinates: 44.398143996559554°N 8.932102850274745°E

T. Mariotti S.P.A.
- Industry: Shipbuilding
- Founded: 1928; 97 years ago in Genova, Italy
- Founder: Temistocle Mariotti
- Headquarters: Genoa, Italy
- Products: Cruise ships, offshore vessels, superyachts
- Owner: Genova Industrie Navali Holding
- Number of employees: 1000
- Website: www.mariottiyard.it

T. Mariotti S.p.A. is an Italian shipbuilder based in Genoa, Italy. The company specializes in building small cruise ship - mainly focused on the luxury market, superyachts and offshore vessels. The company also does refits of ships and yachts. T. Mariotti employs roughly 1,000 people.

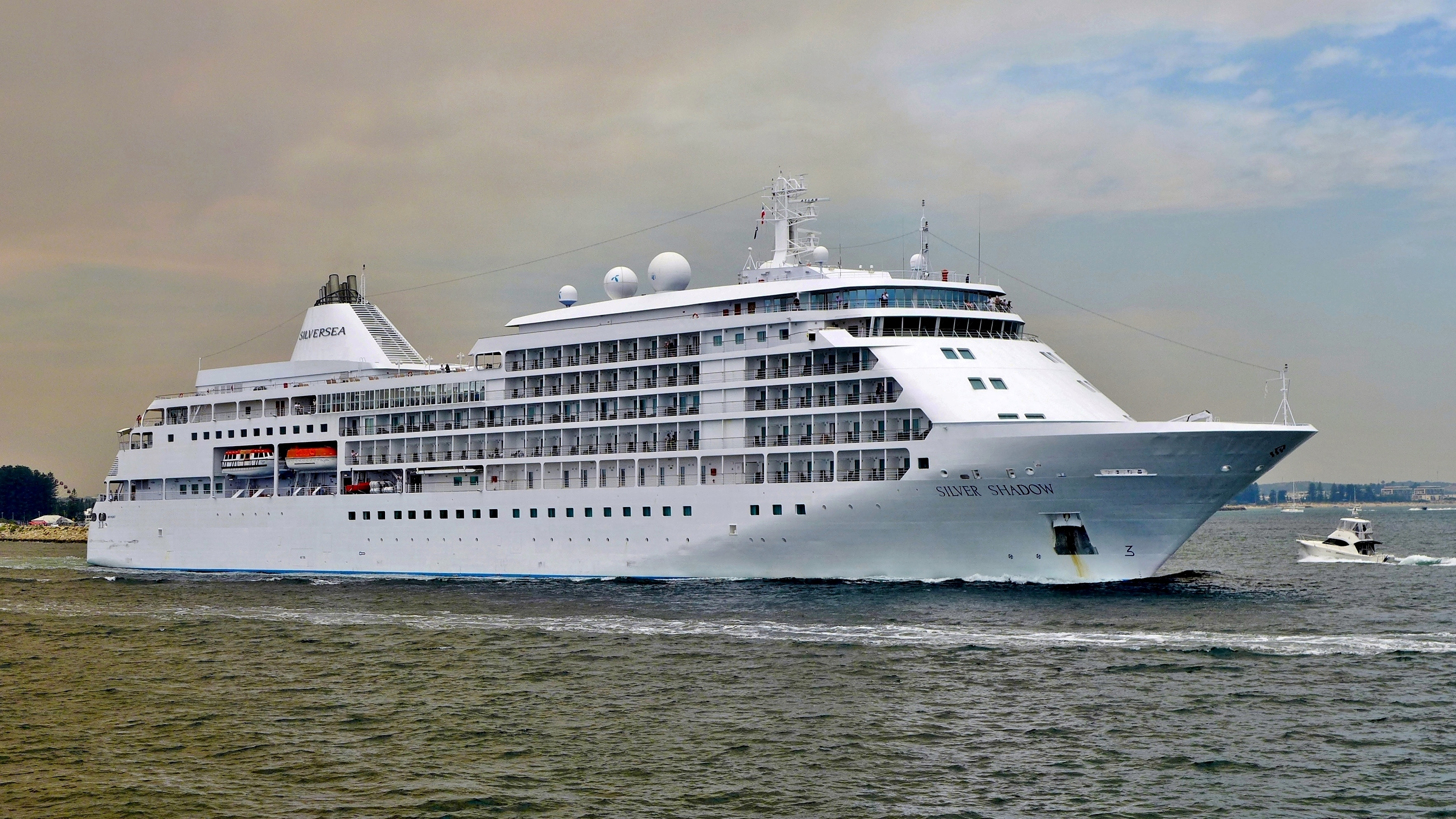
Silver Shadow, built by T. Mariotti in 1999

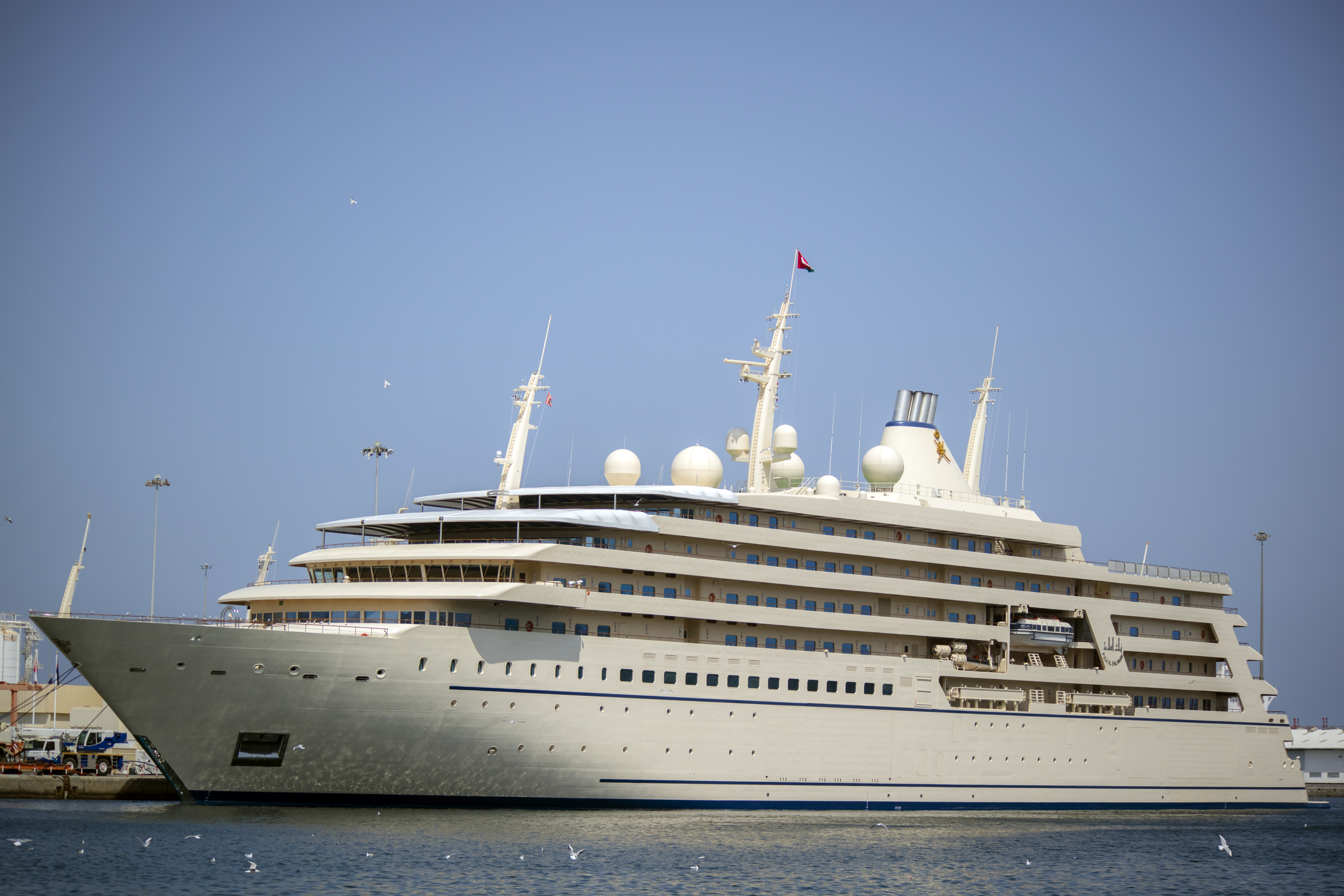
Fulk Al Salamah, built by T.Mariotti in 2016

== History ==
The company was founded in 1928 as a ship repair company by Temistocle Mariotti. In the 1950s the company began to focus on ship conversions. The company entered the cruise ship market in the 1990s. Here it mostly focuses on the ultra luxury cruise ship segment, building ships that are smaller but more luxurious than many of its competitors. The company claims that its ships are built to the highest environmental regulatory standards.

In the 2000s entered the superyacht market, via its brand Mariotti Yachts.

In 2007 T. Mariotti entered into a joint venture with Italian steel manufacturer Cimolai S.p.A. to form CI.MAR Costruzioni Navali S.p.A. The joint venture is a shipyard based at Cimolai's facility alongside the Corno River, near San Giorgio di Nogaro. CIMAR builds the ship's hull which is subsequently towed to Genoa and outfitted by T. Mariotti. The first ship built under this arrangement was Seabourn Odyssey.

In the 2010s the company further diversified into the offshore sector.

In 2019 Rete Ferroviaria Italiana placed an order with T. Mariotti for a rail ferry. The ship was to be 147 metres (482 ft 3 in) long and to operate in the Strait of Messina. The ship was named Iginia and was delivered in November 2021 to Bluferries. The ship is hybrid powered and is claimed to emit zero emissions in port.

In 2021 T. Mariotti began outfitting MV Seabourn Venture, the first luxury expedition ship that the yard had dealt with. The ship's hull was built by the CIMAR shipyard in San Giorgio di Nogaro. Seabourn Venture was delivered in June 2022.

It is announced in 2023 that T. Mariotti will realize for the Marina Militare two units of transport of cargo and personnel, but also of support to the services of signaling of lighthouses and ships. A contract that strengthens the activity on the military market of this shipyard, already selected for the construction of the new submarine intervention building of the Italian fleet.

In spring 2024 the construction of the megayacht for Aman at Sea begins, the result of a joint venture with Cruise Saudi, which will debut in 2027.

== Notable vessels ==
Name	Built for	Year Completed	Notes
Costa Marina	Costa Cruises	1988	Built as a container ship by Wärtsilä Turku Shipyard in 1969 and converted to a cruise ship by T. Mariotti for Costa Cruises in 1988.
Silver Cloud	Silversea Cruises	1995	Hull constructed at Cantiere Navale Visentini
Silver Wind	Silversea Cruises	1995	Hull constructed at Cantiere Navale Visentini
Seven Seas Navigator	Radisson Seven Seas Cruises	1999	
Silver Shadow	Silversea Cruises	2000	
Silver Whisper	Silversea Cruises	2001	
Seven Seas Voyager	Regent Seven Seas Cruises	2003	
Seabourn Odyssey	Seabourn	2009	Hull was built by the CIMAR shipyard in San Giorgio di Nogaro
Seabourn Sojourn	Seabourn	2011	Hull was built by the CIMAR shipyard in San Giorgio di Nogaro
Seabourn Quest	Seabourn	2016	Hull was built by the CIMAR shipyard in San Giorgio di Nogaro
Fulk Al Salamah	Oman Royal Yacht	2016	The royal yacht of Oman.; As of 2022 it is the second longest yacht in the world.
Seabourn Venture	Seabourn	2022	Hull was built by the CIMAR shipyard in San Giorgio di Nogaro
Seabourn Pursuit	Seabourn	2023	Hull was built by the CIMAR shipyard in San Giorgio di Nogaro

=== Yachts ===
- Persefoni I (built as Rahil), 2012
- Sea Force One, 2008
