= Seabourn Ovation =

Cruise ship (launched 2017)

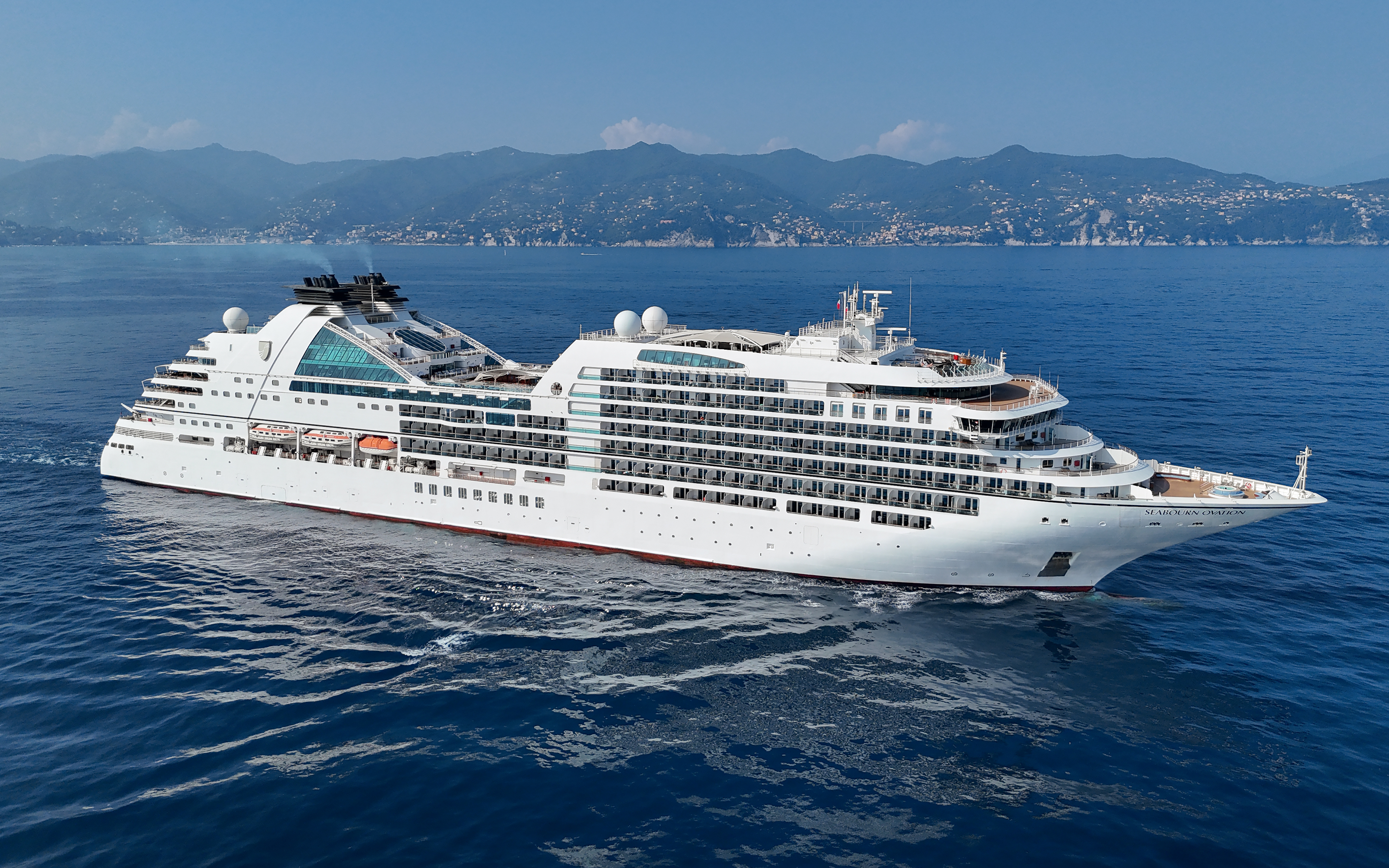
- Seabourn Ovation in Portofino, Italy

History
- Name: Seabourn Ovation
- Operator: Seabourn Cruise Line
- Port of registry: Bahamas
- Builder: Fincantieri
- Laid down: 2 December 2016
- Launched: 1 September 2017
- Christened: 11 May 2018
- Completed: April 2018
- In service: May 2018
- Identification: IMO number: 9764958; MMSI number: 311000585; Callsign: C6CV5
- Status: In service

General characteristics
- Class & type: Encore-class cruise ship
- Tonnage: 41,865 GT
- Length: 210 m (689 ft 0 in)
- Beam: 28 m (91 ft 10 in)
- Draught: 6.5 m (21 ft 4 in)
- Installed power: 4 × Wärtsilä 12V32; 23,040 kW (combined)
- Speed: 15 knots (28 km/h; 17 mph) (cruise); 18.6 knots (34.4 km/h; 21.4 mph) (max)
- Capacity: 604 passengers

Seabourn Ovation is a cruise ship owned by Seabourn Cruise Line. The ship was ordered at Fincantieri in December 2014. The construction started on 7 June 2016. The keel was laid on 2 December 2016 in Sestri Ponente (Genoa). It is the sister ship of Seabourn Encore.

Seabourn Ovation was officially delivered to her owner on April 27, 2018. After setting sail from Genoa, she was christened on May 11 in the port of Valletta, Malta by British singer and actress Elaine Paige. The lyricist Tim Rice wrote a song specifically for the occasion. The ship will spend her inaugural season in Europe.

The ship is the fifth to be delivered to her owners in the last decade. It has 300 suites, each with a balcony. Over 1,600 works of art, by 120 artists, are displayed aboard the ship.
