= Seabourn Encore =

Cruise ship (launched 2016)

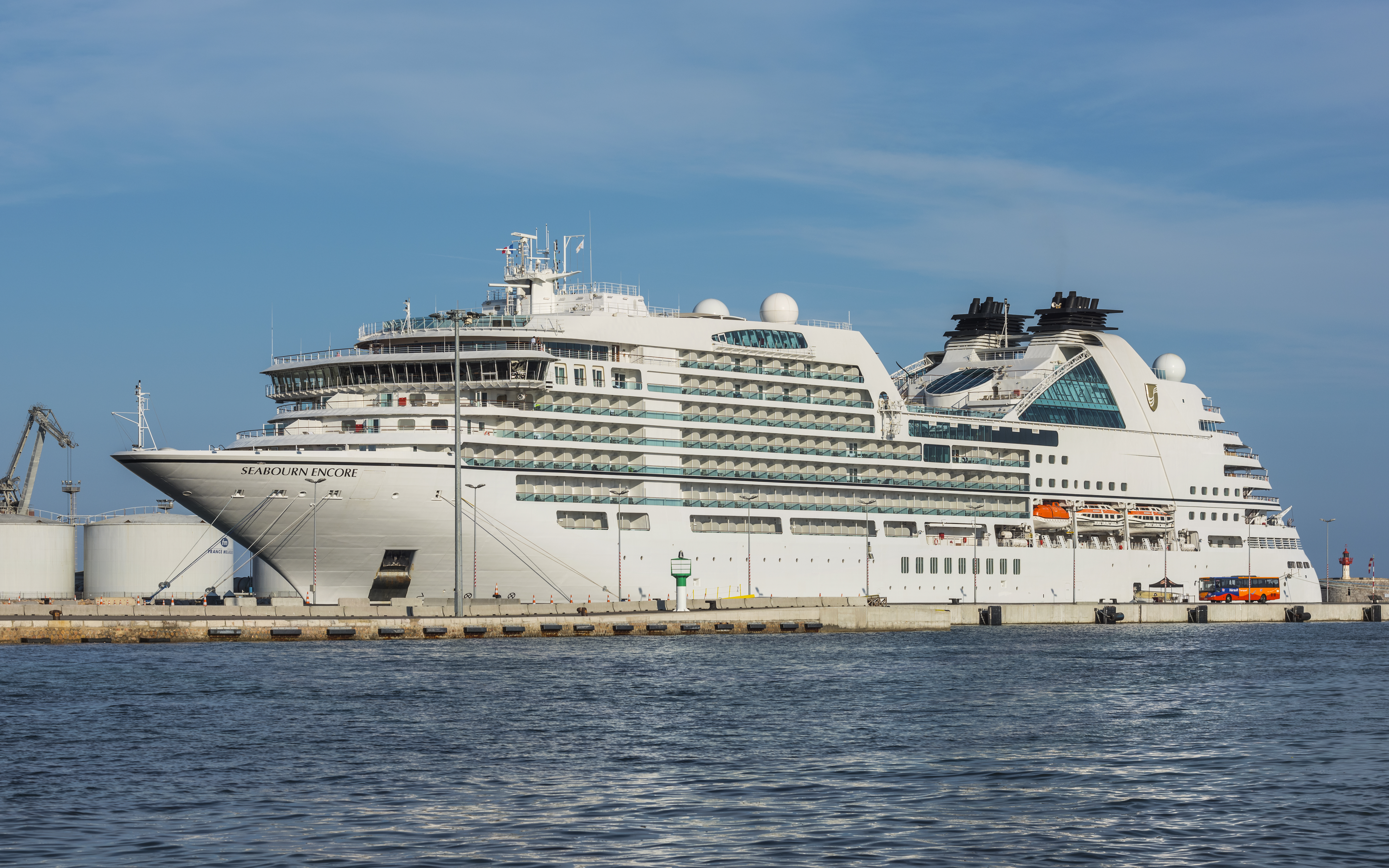
- Seabourn Encore, in the harbour of Sète, France

History
- Name: Seabourn Encore
- Operator: Seabourn Cruise Line
- Port of registry: Bahamas
- Builder: Fincantieri
- Laid down: September 15, 2015
- Launched: March 4, 2016
- Completed: November 30, 2016
- In service: January 7, 2017
- Identification: IMO number: 9731171; MMSI number: 311000464; Callsign: C6CG4

General characteristics
- Class & type: Encore-class cruise ship
- Tonnage: 41,865 GT
- Length: 210.5 m (690 ft 7 in)
- Beam: 28 m (91 ft 10 in)
- Draught: 6.53 m (21 ft 5 in)
- Installed power: 4 × Wärtsilä 12V32; 23,040 kW (combined)
- Speed: 15 knots (28 km/h; 17 mph) (cruise); 18.6 knots (34.4 km/h; 21.4 mph) (max)
- Capacity: 604 passengers

Seabourn Encore is a luxury cruise ship built by Fincantieri of Italy for Seabourn Cruise Line. The first of a new class of ships about 26% larger than Seabourn's three Odyssey-class vessels, she holds about 34% more passengers, based on double occupancy. She was delivered on November 30, 2016 and is the sister ship of the Seabourn Ovation.

== Concept and construction ==
Seabourn Cruise Line signed a letter of intent for the construction of Seabourn Encore in October 2013, and announced her name in January 2015. A steel plate-cutting ceremony was held in April 2015. The ship is 210 meters long with a 28-meter beam, and has a cruising speed of 18.6 knots (37 km/h).

== Architecture and equipment ==
Seabourn Encore is larger than the Odyssey-class vessels, with an additional deck and expanded public areas. Adam D. Tihany, a well-known hospitality interior designer, was appointed to design the indoor and outdoor guest facilities. According to Fincantieri, fuel consumption is "significantly reduced" by optimization of the ship's hydrodynamics.

== Service history ==
Seabourn Encore entered service in January 2017, following two "pre-inaugural" cruises departing in December 2016. She had a naming ceremony in Singapore on January 7, 2017, and then departed on her official maiden voyage, a 10-day cruise to Bali, Indonesia. After the maiden voyage, which sold out in just two days, Seabourn Encore headed to Australia.

In February 2017, Seabourn Encore was involved in a collision with the concrete carrier Milburn Carrier II after her mooring snapped during heavy winds. The New Zealand Transport Accident Investigation Commission inquired into the incident, reporting in April 2019, and urging that port companies should know the safe working loads of their moorings and have high quality monitoring of weather conditions
