= Smart Club =

Norwegian retail chain

Smart Club AS
- Company type: Subsidiary
- Industry: Retail
- Founded: 20 February 1995
- Founder: Atle Brynestad
- Headquarters: Oslo, Norway
- Number of locations: 3
- Area served: Norway
- Key people: Svein Guldbrandsen (CEO)
- Revenue: 1,500 million kr (2006)
- Net income: NOK 55 million (2006)
- Parent: Coop Norge SA
- Website: www.smartclub.no

Smart Club AS was a Norwegian retail chain with three outlets, offering the products from forty product categories. The stores had a membership programme, where customers paid NOK 100 to gain bonuses throughout the year.

== History ==
The company was founded in 1995 by Atle Brynestad through his investment company CG Holding and had eight outlets at a time. In July 2008, the chain was bought by Coop NKL who converted three stores to their own hypermarket chain, Coop Obs!, two to Coop Mega and one to Coop Xtra. They let two outlets, all in the Greater Oslo Region, stay under the Smart Club name. One outlet is at Alnabru and the second is at Slependen. In 2010, a new Smart Club was opened in Råde.

The store in Alnabru was later converted to a Coop Obs! Hypermarked and a Coop Obs! Bygg, splitting the old Smart Club into two separate stores. The building also currently house an Expert XL (consumer electronics) and Lampehuset Lysgiganten(Lamps and lighting), The Slependen Store was reduced significantly in floor space and remaining space converted to the Coop Extra discount format, but has struggled. http://www.budstikka.no/%C3%B8konomi-bolig/coop-extra-sliter-med-salget-pa-slependen-1.8362107 (link in Norwegian)
