= SeaDream Yacht Club =

Cruise line

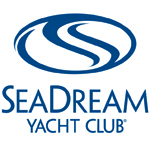
- Type: Private
- Industry: Transport
- Founded: 2001
- Founder: Atle Brynestad
- Headquarters: Oslo, Norway.
- Area served: Mediterranean; Caribbean; Northern Europe; Asia-Pacific
- Key people: Atle Brynestad, chairman and owner; Andreas Brynestad, President and CEO
- Services: Cruising
- Website: SeaDream Yacht Club

SeaDream Yacht Club is a private cruise line with its headquarters in Oslo, Norway. It was founded in 2001 by Atle Brynestad, the Norwegian founder of Seabourn Cruise Line.

== Market position ==
According to USA Today, "SeaDream Yacht Club delivers a luxurious, yet low-key experience that's appealing even to those who don't usually cruise." SeaDream's slogan is "it's yachting, not cruising". The company's passengers are likely to be SeaDream repeaters, and to feel like members of a club: "It's a well-traveled, cultured, convivial bunch, mostly Americans and Europeans and mostly couples, age 40 and up."

As of 2014, SeaDream's destinations included the Mediterranean, Caribbean, northern Europe and Asia-Pacific.

== Fleet ==
SeaDream runs a fleet of two small cruise ships, formerly operated by Sea Goddess Cruises:

Ship	Built	Builder	Crew	Passengers	Notes	Image
SeaDream I	1984	Wärtsilä Helsinki Shipyard	95	112	ex-Sea Goddess I, Seabourn Goddess I.	
SeaDream II	1985	Wärtsilä Helsinki Shipyard	95	112	ex-Sea Goddess II, Seabourn Goddess II.	

The two ships have been said to offer "... clubby scale, [and a] sense of privacy and exclusivity ...", but with lodgings not as luxurious as those of Seabourn or Silversea vessels. Each is equipped with a watersports marina that can be lowered for activities such as swimming, snorkelling, kayaking, windsurfing, and waterskiing. Both ships are stocked with complimentary equipment for waterborne activities, including wave runners, glass-bottom kayaks, Laser sailboats, a banana boat, water skis, snorkeling gear and standup paddleboards. Also available are mountain bikes for use ashore.

=== Future ships ===
On March 20, 2019, the company announced the purchase of a new 220-passenger ship, SeaDream Innovation, from Damen Shipyards. It was planned to start sailing in September 2021. It was cancelled the same year

== See also ==
- Cruising (maritime)
- List of cruise lines
