= Atle Brynestad =

Norwegian investor (born 1953)

- Born: 30 September 1953 (age 72)
- Occupation: Investor
- Spouse: Linn Stokke

Atle Brynestad (born 30 September 1953) is a Norwegian investor.

== Personal life ==
Born on 30 September 1953, Brynestad married actress Linn Stokke in 1990. They bought the Steninge Palace in Sweden in 1999.

== Career ==
Through his investment companies, Brynestad has been a major owner of Christiania Glasmagasin since 1984 and Hadeland Glassverk since 1986, chairing the boards of both companies. He bought the Porsgrund Porcelain Factory in 1996.

Brynestad founded the trading company Smart Club in 1996 and later sold the company. He was the owner of Lyn Fotball from 1999 to 2008.

A ship owner, Brynestad founded the cruise ship company Seabourn Cruise Line in the 1980s and SeaDream Yacht Club in 2001.
