= Seabourn Cruise Line =

American luxury cruise line

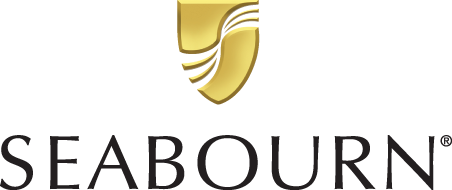
- Type: Subsidiary
- Industry: Tourism
- Founded: 1986; 40 years ago
- Headquarters: Seattle, Washington, United States
- Key people: Beth Bodensteiner, President
- Services: Cruises
- Parent: Carnival Corporation & plc
- Website: www.seabourn.com

Seabourn Cruise Line is a luxury cruise line headquartered in Seattle, Washington. It is owned by Carnival Corporation & plc.

== History ==
Seabourn Cruise Line was founded in 1986 under the name "Signet Cruise Lines" by the Norwegian private investor Atle Brynestad and Warren S. Titus. The name "Seabourn Cruise Line" was adopted shortly afterward following objections over trademark ownership by Signet Oil.

Its first ship built, Seabourn Pride, entered service in 1988, followed by an identical sister, Seabourn Spirit, in 1989. A third vessel, originally planned for 1990, was delayed due to investors' financial constraints and was ultimately purchased by Royal Viking Line in 1992 as Royal Viking Queen. In 1995, Royal Viking Queen was transferred to a Kloster subsidiary, Royal Cruise Line, as Queen Odyssey.

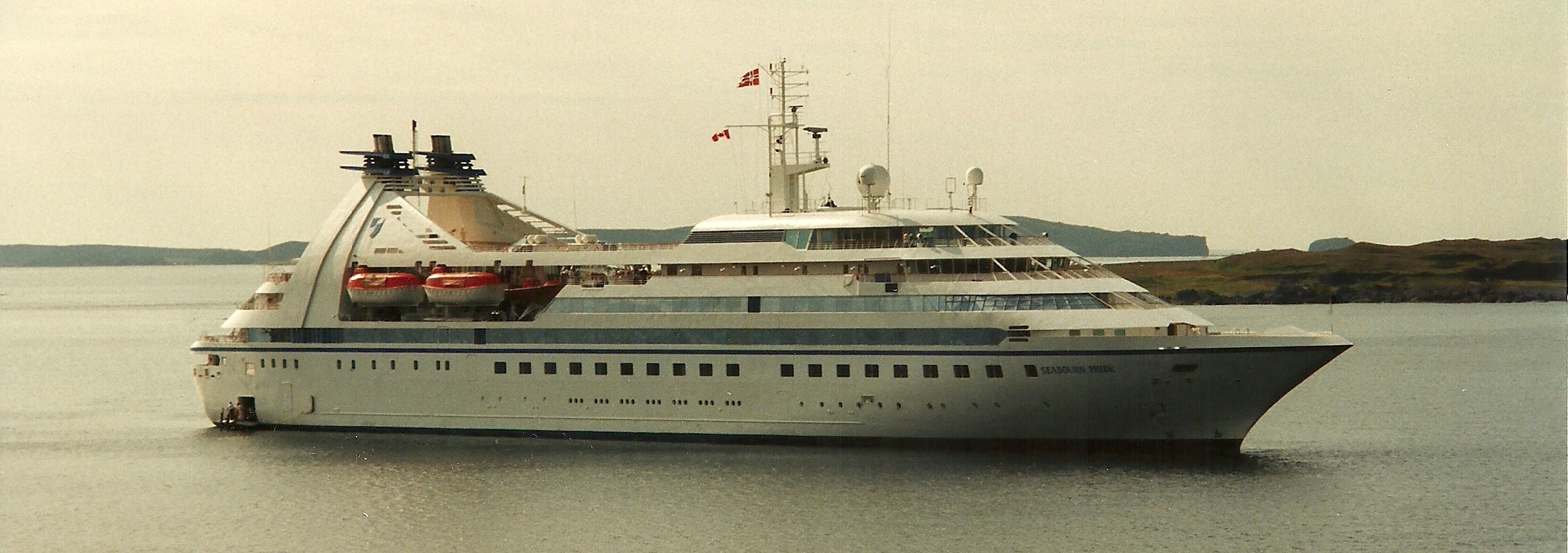
Seabourn's first ship built Seabourn Pride taken on 9 September 1993

In 1991, Carnival Corporation purchased a 25% stake in Seabourn. Carnival Corporation increased its stake to 50% in 1996, providing the company sufficient capital to purchase the Queen Odyssey, which was then renamed Seabourn Legend.

In 1998, in partnership with a consortium of a Norwegian businessmen, Carnival purchased the remaining 50% stake in Seabourn, as well as acquiring the Cunard Line from Kvaerner ASA, and merged the two brands into an entity called Cunard Line. In 1999, three Cunard ships, Sea Goddess I, Sea Goddess II, and Royal Viking Sun were transferred into the Seabourn fleet as Seabourn Goddess I, Seabourn Goddess II, and Seabourn Sun.

In 2001, Carnival bought out the Norwegian shareholders, and Seabourn's parent company became a wholly owned subsidiary of Carnival. That summer, Seabourn Goddess I and Seabourn Goddess II were sold to Seabourn's original founder, Atle Brynestad, in order to establish his own cruise line SeaDream Yacht Club. In 2002, Seabourn Sun was transferred to the Carnival-owned Holland America Line, reducing the Seabourn fleet to its three original sister ships, and the company was demerged from Cunard Line and reorganized as a stand-alone operating brand of Carnival Corporation & plc.

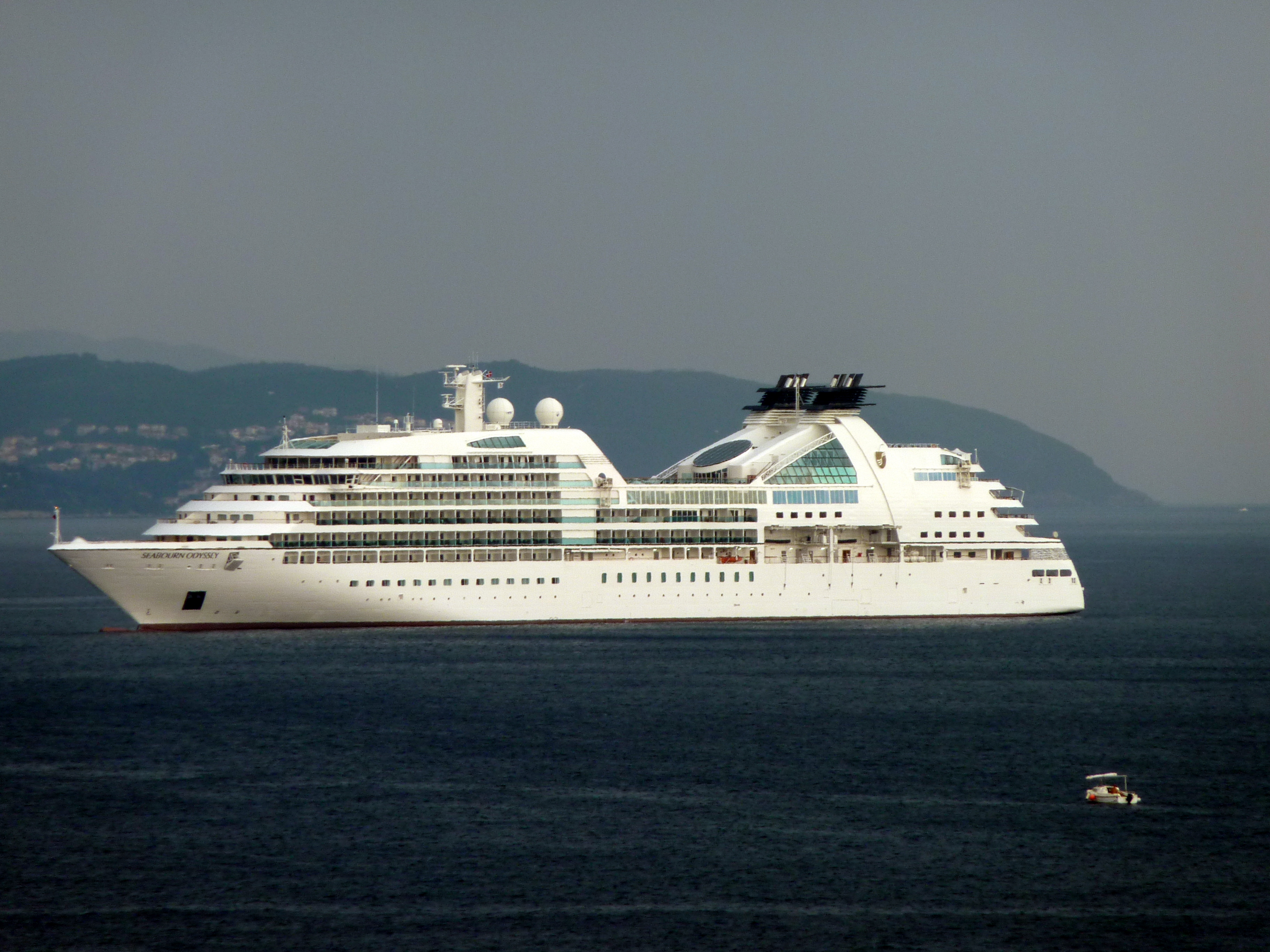
Seabourn Odyssey, lines first new build in almost 20 years

In October 2006, Seabourn ordered three new, 32,000-ton cruise ships from Genoa's T. Mariotti shipyard. The first, named Seabourn Odyssey entered service in 2009, followed by the Seabourn Sojourn in 2010 and the Seabourn Quest in June 2011. The three ships share most features. The Odyssey, Sojourn, and Quest have a maximum passenger capacity of 450 guests, quartered in 225 suite cabins, 90% of which have a balcony. The 650-foot (200 m) vessels cost approximately US$250 million each. The ships have 11 decks, an 11,500-square-foot (1,070 m^{2}) indoor/outdoor spa, and four alternative dining venues.

On March 31, 2011, Seabourn moved operations from Miami, Florida, to the Holland America Line quarters in Seattle, Washington.

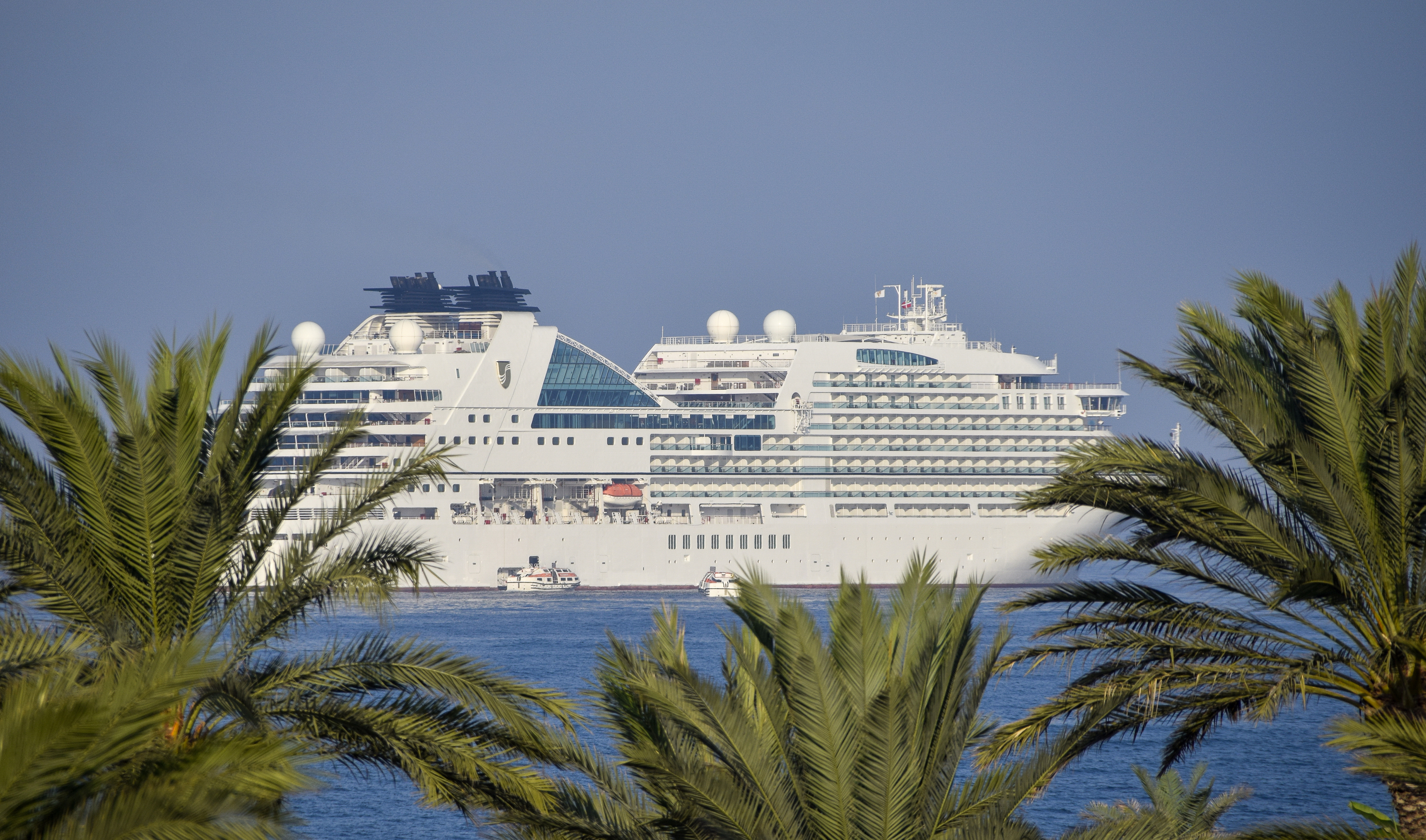
The luxury cruise ship Seabourn Ovation in the Mediterranean Sea

It was announced on February 19, 2013, that Seabourn reached an agreement with Windstar Cruises for the sale of the three smaller Seabourn ships. Seabourn Pride departed the fleet in April 2014, sisters Seabourn Legend & Seabourn Spirit departed in April and May 2015, respectively. No cruises were cancelled as the ships sailed with Seabourn until their initial dry dock periods.

On October 18, 2013, Seabourn announced it had signed a Letter of Intent for the construction of a new cruise ship with Italian shipbuilder Fincantieri. The new ship was modeled after the line's three newest vessels, Seabourn Odyssey, Seabourn Sojourn and Seabourn Quest. Delivery was completed in 2016. The vessel replaced the capacity that left the Seabourn brand with the sale of Seabourn Pride, Seabourn Spirit and Seabourn Legend. In July 2018, the cruise line announced it would add two expedition ships to its fleet. Seabourn Venture was delivered on June 29, 2022 and inaugural voyage on July 27, 2022. Seabourn Pursuit entered service in August 2023.

On March 16, 2023 Seabourn announced that Seabourn Odyssey would be sold to Mitsui O.S.K. Lines, Ltd. (MOL). The ship will remain with the brand under a charter agreement through the end of August 2024.

On March 4, 2025 Seabourn announced that Seabourn Sojourn would also be sold to Mitsui O.S.K. Lines, Ltd. The ship will remain with Seabourn through all its current sailings through May 2026. With those sales, the capacity will shrink by 15 percent between 2021 and 2026 despite the newbuilts.

== Fleet ==
The company's fleet currently consists of five vessels, with two sets of sister ships.

=== Current fleet ===
Ship	Image	Delivered	Builder	In service for Seabourn	Gross Tonnage	Flag	Notes
Seabourn Quest		June 2011	T. Mariotti	2011–present	32,348 GT	Bahamas	Godmother: Blythe Danner
Seabourn Encore		November 2016	Fincantieri	2016–present	41,865 GT	Bahamas	Largest ship to be built for Seabourn Godmother: Sarah Brightman
Seabourn Ovation		April 2018	Fincantieri	2018–present	41,865 GT	Bahamas	Sister to Seabourn Encore Godmother: Elaine Page
Seabourn Venture		June 2022	T. Mariotti	2022–present	~ 23,000 GT	Bahamas	First expedition cruise ship for Seabourn; Debut originally scheduled for May 2021, but delayed to 2022 due to COVID-19 pandemic; Godmother: Alison Levine
Seabourn Pursuit		July 2023	T. Mariotti	2023–present	~ 23,000 GT	Bahamas	Sister ship to Seabourn Venture.

=== Former fleet ===
Ship	Image	Built	Builder	In service for Seabourn Cruise Line	Gross Tonnage	Flag	Status as of 2020
Seabourn Goddess I		1984	Wärtsilä; Helsinki Shipyard	1999–2001	4,253 tons	Bahamas	Transferred to SeaDream Yacht Club as SeaDream I.
Seabourn Goddess II		1985	Wärtsilä; Helsinki Shipyard	1999–2001	4,253 tons	Bahamas	Transferred to SeaDream Yacht Club as SeaDream II.
Seabourn Sun		1988	Wärtsilä Marine; Perno Shipyard	1999–2002	38,848 tons	Bahamas	Currently sailing for Phoenix Reisen as MS Amera.
Seabourn Pride		1988	Schichau Seebeckwerft	1989–2014	9,975 tons	Bahamas	Transferred to Windstar Cruises as Star Pride.
Seabourn Spirit		1988	Schichau Seebeckwerft	1989–2015	9,975 tons	Bahamas	Transferred to Windstar Cruises as Star Breeze.
Seabourn Legend		1992	Schichau Seebeckwerft	1995–2015	9,975 tons	Bahamas	Transferred to Windstar Cruises as Star Legend.
Seabourn Odyssey		2009	T. Mariotti	2009–2024	32,346 tons	Bahamas	Sold to Mitsui O.S.K. Lines (MOL) in March 2023 and leased back to Seabourn until ship's exit in August 2024
Seabourn Sojourn		2010	T. Mariotti	2010–2026	32,346 tons	Bahamas	Sold to Mitsui O.S.K. Lines (MOL) in March 2025 and leased back to Seabourn until ship's exit in May 2026

== See also ==
- Oceania Cruises
- Regent Seven Seas Cruises
- Silversea Cruises
