= Seabourn Sojourn =

Cruise ship

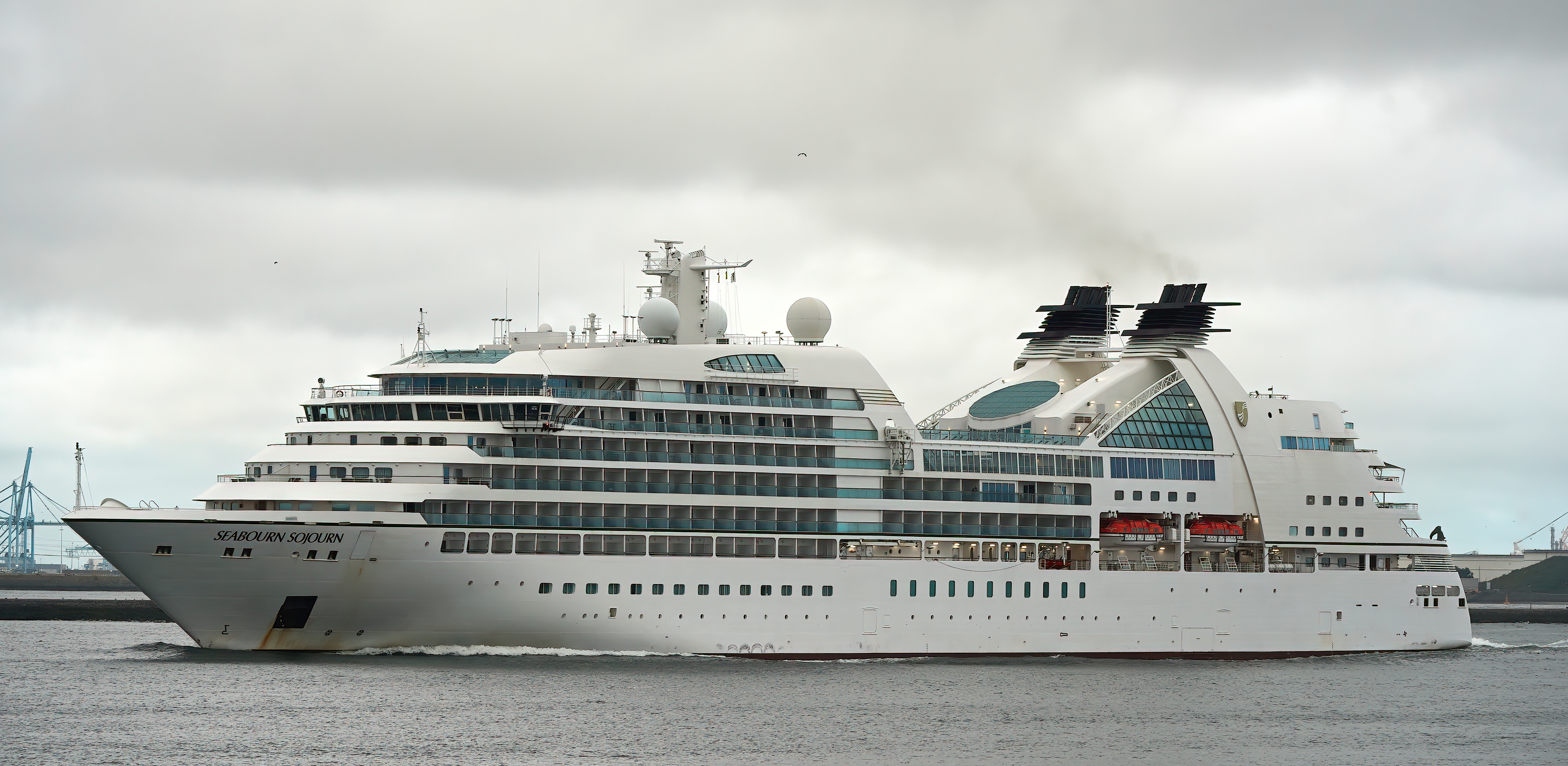
- Seabourn Sojourn (Later; Mitsui Ocean Sakura) near Hook of Holland, 2025

History

Bahamas
- Name: Seabourn Sojourn (2010–2026); Mitsui Ocean Sakura (2026–Present)
- Owner: Carnival Corporation & plc (2010–2026); Mitsui O.S.K. Lines (2026–Present)
- Operator: Seabourn Cruise Line (2010–2026); Mitsui Ocean Cruises (2026–Present)
- Port of registry: Nassau, Bahamas
- Ordered: November 2008
- Builder: T. Mariotti, Genoa, Italy
- Launched: June 2010
- Christened: June 4, 2010
- Completed: 2010
- Acquired: 2026
- In service: 2010-present
- Identification: Call sign C6YA5; IMO number: 9417098; MMSI number: 311027100
- Status: In service

General characteristics
- Class & type: Seabourn Odyssey class
- Type: Cruise ship
- Tonnage: 32,346 GT
- Length: 198.00 meters
- Beam: 25.60 meters
- Draft: 6.40 meters
- Speed: 22.3 knots (41.3 km/h; 25.7 mph) (maximum); 21.6 knots (40.0 km/h; 24.9 mph) (cruising)
- Capacity: 450 passengers

Seabourn Sojourn is a luxury cruise ship chartered and operated by Seabourn Cruise Line. The ship was ordered for building in the shipyard of T. Mariotti in Genoa, Italy. In 2026, ownership will transfer to Mitsui Ocean Cruises.

== Design ==
The Seabourn Sojourn was ordered in November 2008. The ship has a length of 198 meters and a beam of 25.60 meters. The draft is 6.40 meters; the ship is divided into 11 passenger decks and has a capacity of 450. There are 225 staterooms. The gross tonnage of the ship is 32,346. Along with its two other sister ships the Seabourn Odyssey and the Seabourn Quest were designed by YSA Design of Oslo, Norway.

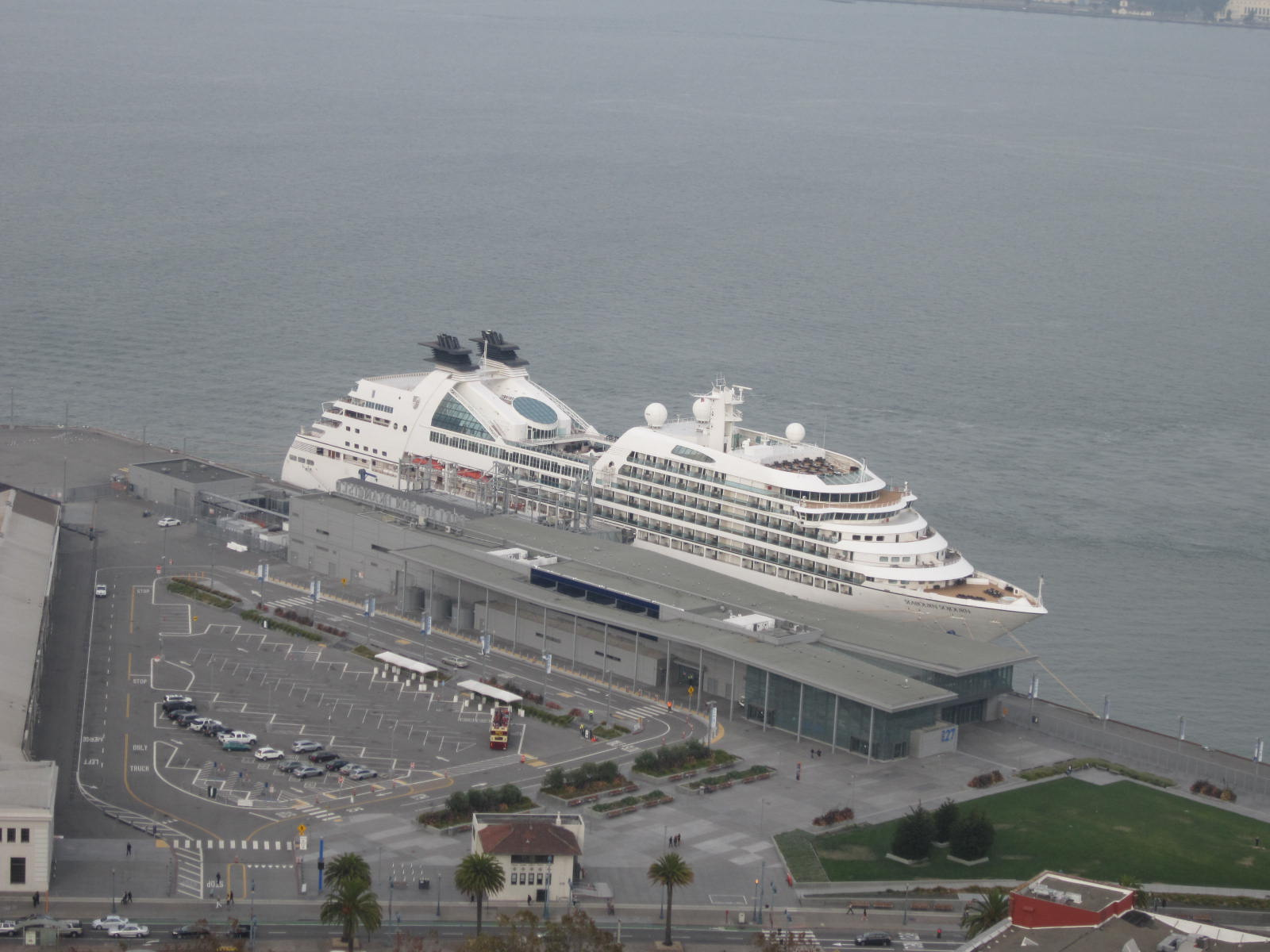
Seabourn Sojourn (Later; Mitsui Ocean Sakura) docked in San Francisco, California, 2017

In December 2017, the ship underwent a six-day refit in Freeport, Bahamas.

== Service ==
Seabourn Sojourn was scheduled to be named on 4 June at London, then began her maiden voyage at Greenwich on 6 June 2010. The maiden season sailed in Northern Europe (Scandinavia/Baltic and Norway), before crossing the Atlantic Ocean and cruising the Caribbean and Panama Canal in the late autumn and winter. In January 2011, Seabourn Sojourn was to begin a 111-day round-the-world cruise from Los Angeles, to Southampton, England.

On 4 November 2019, the ship departed on the company's first ever sailing to Cuba. In total, she took five cruises to this island country.

The ship departed Miami on a World Cruise on 4 January 2020. During a 146-day sailing, Seabourn Sojourn was due to visit 62 ports in 36 countries. Due to the COVID-19 pandemic this was cut short and the ship was due in Hawaii on 18 April to refuel but no passengers or crew were allowed to disembark.

On 4 March 2025, it was announced that Seabourn Sojourn will be sold to Mitsui OSK Lines, joining her sister ship Mitsui Ocean Fuji, the former Seabourn Odyssey. The ship will remain with Seabourn until the completion of its current schedule of sailing in May 2026.

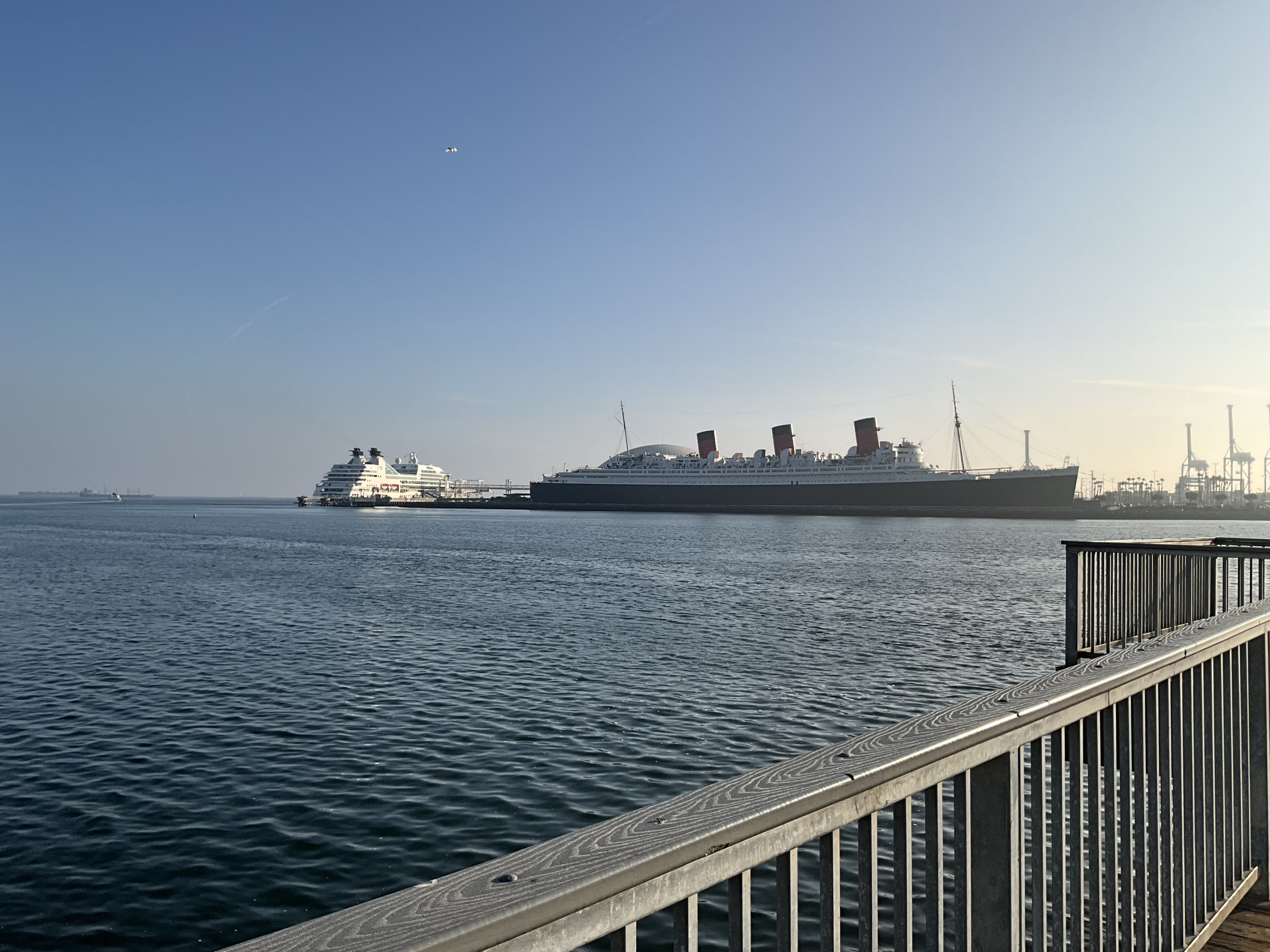
Seabourn Sojourn (Later; Mitsui Ocean Sakura) docked in Long Beach, California with RMS Queen Mary, 2025
