= SeaDream II =

Cruise ship built in 1985

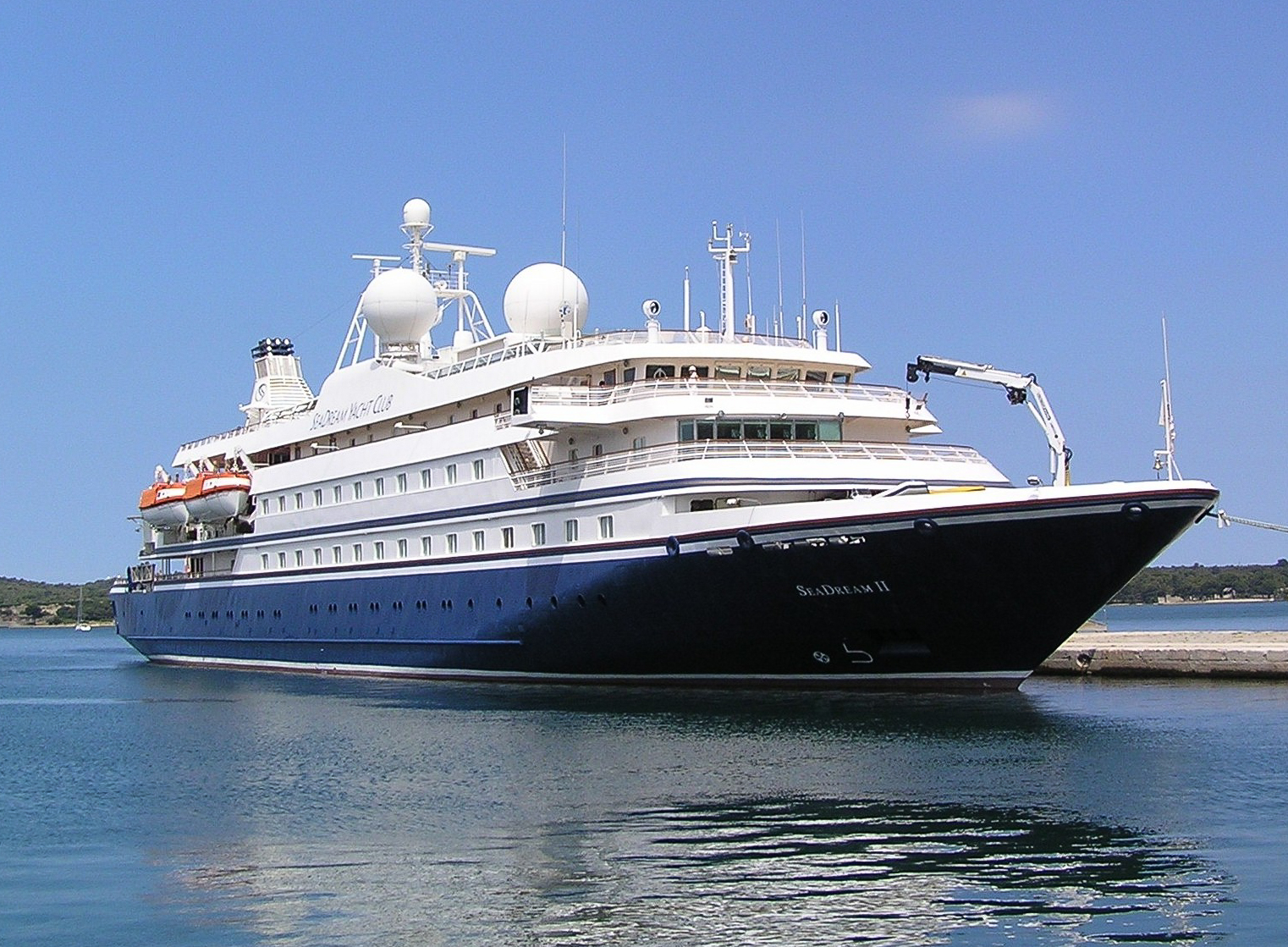
- SeaDream II in Pula, Croatia

History
- Name: 1985–1998: Sea Goddess II; 1998-2001: Seabourn Goddess II; 2001-present: SeaDream II
- Operator: 1985–1986: Sea Goddess Cruises; 1996-1998: Cunard Line; 2000-2001: Seabourn Cruise Line; 2001 onwards: SeaDream Yacht Club
- Port of registry: 1985-1998: Oslo, Norway; 1999 onwards: Nassau, Bahamas
- Builder: Wärtsilä Helsinki Shipyard, Finland
- Launched: 29 September 1984
- Identification: IMO number: 8203440
- Status: In service

General characteristics
- Class & type: Cruise ship
- Tonnage: 4,333 GT
- Length: 104.8 m.
- Beam: 14,6 m.
- Draught: 4.4 m.
- Decks: 3 passenger decks
- Speed: 15 knots (28 km/h; 17 mph)
- Capacity: 110 passengers
- Crew: 95

SeaDream II is a small cruise ship operated by SeaDream Yacht Club. In service since 1985, she was formerly named Sea Goddess II and operated by Cunard. This was followed by a transfer to Seabourn in 2000 where she became Seabourn Goddess II. In 2001 the ship was sold to Sea Dream Yacht Club. She is a sister ship to SeaDream I.
