= SeaDream I =

Cruise ship built in 1984

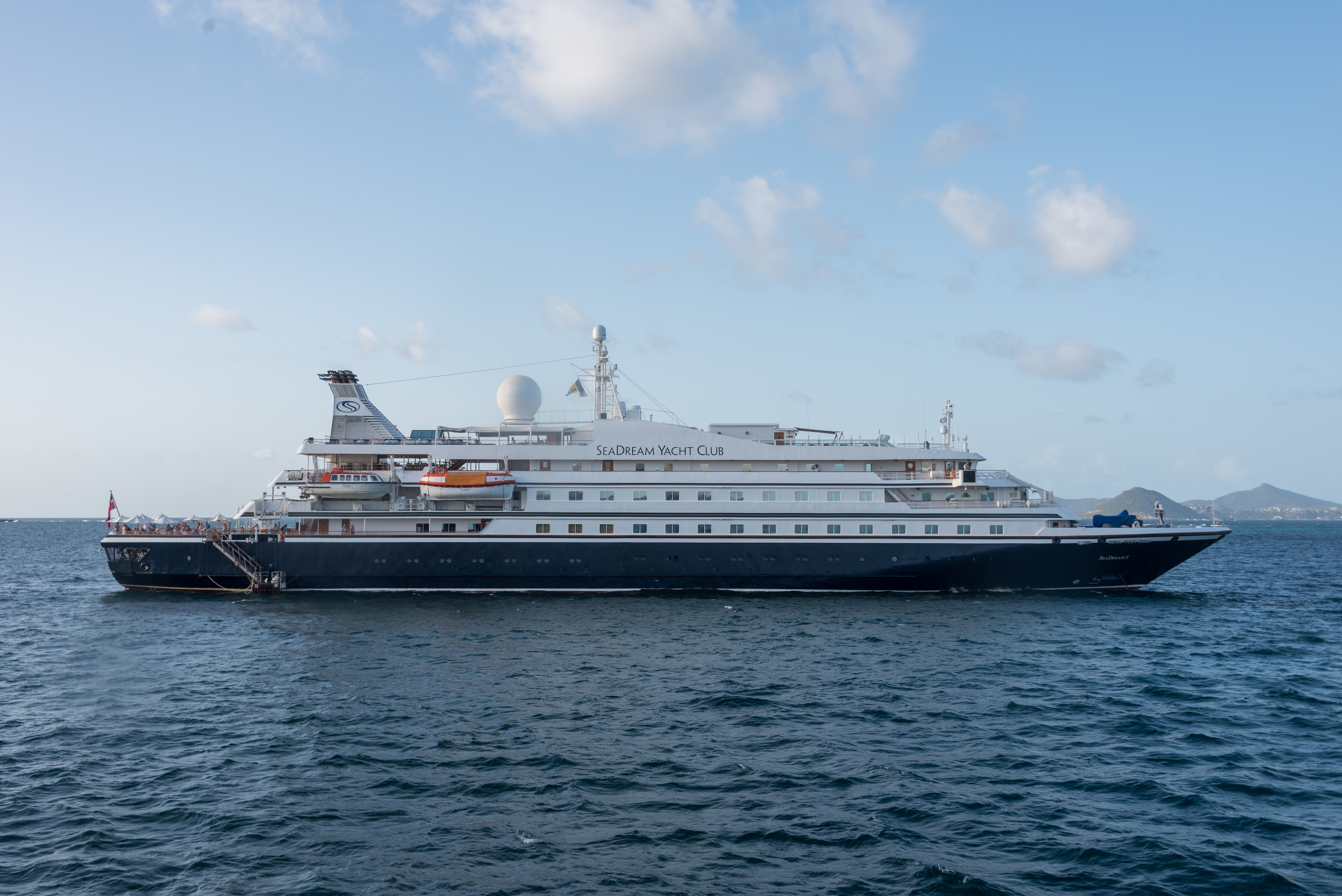
- SeaDream I at Tobago Cays in the Caribbean Grenadines

History
- Name: 1984–1998: Sea Goddess I; 1999–2001: Seabourn Goddess I; 2001–present: SeaDream I
- Owner: SeaDream Yacht Club AS
- Operator: 1984–1986: Sea Goddess Cruises; 1986–2000: Cunard Line; 2000–2001: Seabourn Cruise Line; 2001 onwards: SeaDream Yacht Club
- Port of registry: 1984–1998: Oslo, Norway; 1998 onwards: Nassau, Bahamas
- Builder: Wärtsilä Helsinki Shipyard, Finland
- Launched: 11 July 1983
- Identification: Call sign: C6PW8; IMO number: 8203438; MMSI number: 308908000
- Status: In service

General characteristics
- Class & type: Cruise ship
- Tonnage: 4,253 GT
- Length: 355 ft (108 m)
- Beam: 47 ft (14 m)
- Draught: 23.6 ft (7.2 m)
- Decks: 3 passenger decks
- Speed: 15 knots (28 km/h; 17 mph)
- Capacity: 112 passengers
- Crew: 95

SeaDream I is a yacht-style cruise ship operated by SeaDream Yacht Club since 2001. In service since 1984, she was formerly named Sea Goddess I and operated for Sea Goddess Line and Cunard. In January 2000 she was transferred to Seabourn, becoming Seabourn Goddess I. She is a sister ship to SeaDream II.

== Coronavirus quarantine ==
On 11 November 2020, the Government of Barbados received a request for assistance from SeaDream I with reports of a suspected positive case of COVID-19 on board, Six passengers aboard SeaDream I were later confirmed to have been infected with COVID-19. Subsequently, there was an additional case recorded. On 15 November it was reported that one crew member had also tested positive. On 17 November it was reported that seven guests and two crew members aboard SeaDream 1 tested positive for COVID-19. SeaDream canceled all remaining 2020 cruises following the outbreak.
