= CIMAR Shipyard =

Italian shipbuilder

CI.MAR. Costruzioni Navali S.p.A.
- Founded: 2007
- Headquarters: San Giorgio di Nogaro, Italy
- Products: Ships
- Owner: T. Mariotti, Cimolai S.p.A

The CI.MAR Shipyard (Cimolai-Mariotti) is a shipbuilder based in San Giorgio di Nogaro, Udine, Italy. It is a joint venture between T. Mariotti (a Genoa-based shipbuilder) and Cimolai (a steel manufacturer). The ship's hulls are built at the CIMAR Shipyard and then towed to T. Mariotti's shipyard in Genoa to be completed. The journey to Genoa usually takes around ten days. Often the hulls are floated down the Corno River on a smaller barge, due to the narrowness of the river.

== History ==
Cimolai S.p.A. opened its San Giorgio di Nogaro fabrication plant in 2003. Initially the plant made steel pipes but the facility began making ship hulls in 2007 as part of the joint venture. The yard's first ship was Seabourn Odyssey in July 2007.

45.783437°N 13.238335°E
