= Mitsui Ocean Fuji =

Japanese cruise ship

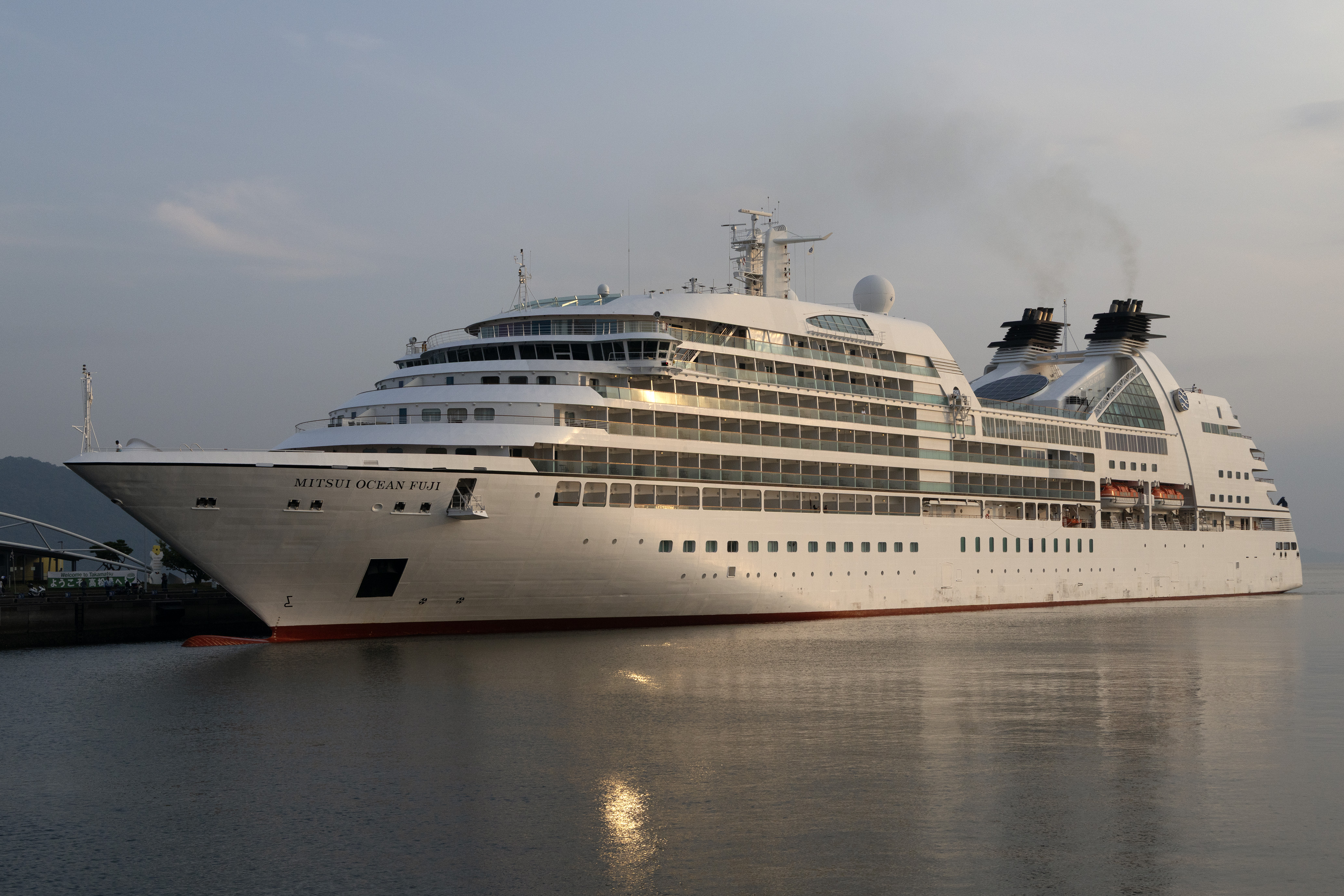
- Mitsui Ocean Fuji at Takamatsu, 2024

History

Bahamas
- Name: Mitsui Ocean Fuji (December 2024–present); Seabourn Odyssey (June 2009–September 2024)
- Owner: Mitsui OSK Lines (February 2023–); Carnival Corporation (June 2009–February 2023)
- Operator: Mitsui Ocean Cruises (December 2024–); Seabourn Cruise Line (June 2009–September 2024)
- Port of registry: Nassau Bahamas
- Cost: $250 million
- Engineered by: Studio Engineering
- Builder: T. Mariotti
- Laid down: 2007
- Christened: June 2009
- Completed: May 2009
- In service: June 2009
- Identification: IMO number: 9417086; MMSI number: 309416000; Callsign: C6XC6
- Status: In service

General characteristics
- Class & type: Seabourn Odyssey-class cruise ship
- Tonnage: 32,346 GT
- Length: 650 ft (200 m)
- Beam: 84 ft (26 m)
- Draft: 21 ft (6.4 m)
- Decks: 11
- Speed: 21 knots (39 km/h; 24 mph)
- Capacity: 450 passengers
- Crew: 335

Mitsui Ocean Fuji is a Japanese cruise ship operated by the Mitsui OSK Lines.

It was built as Seabourn Odyssey for Seabourn Cruise Line in 2009. Mitsui OSK Lines, under their new brand Mitsui Ocean Cruises, purchased the ship in February 2023. She remained leased to the former operator until September 2023. Mitsui acquired this relatively small ship for her suitability for cruising the Seto Inland Sea. The ship arrived in Yokohama in September 2024, where she underwent a major refit.

The ship's namesakes are Mount Fuji and the cruise ship Fuji Maru, which the company operated until 2013. The ship will be based in Japan. The ship embarked on her maiden voyage under the new name from Yokohama on 1 December 2024.

== As Seabourn Odyssey ==
The ship's keel was laid at the CIMAR Shipyard in on 15 July 2007. Its hull was the first one built at the brand new shipyard. Seabourn Odyssey was outfitted at the T. Mariotti shipyard in Genoa, Italy. When it was commissioned in 2009, it was the first new ship for Seabourn in over a decade. The ship was completed in May 2009, a few weeks earlier than planned. The ship undertook sea trials on 22 May 2009 and the naming ceremony took place in Venice, Italy on 24 June 2009. Seabourn Odyssey was delivered by T. Mariotti on 29 June 2009 and was reported to have cost 550 million euros.

A sister ship, Seabourn Sojourn, was launched in 2010. In June 2017, Seabourn Odyssey completed a five-day interior refit by Trimline. Staterooms, restrooms and a restaurant were refreshed. In July 2019 the ship completed another refit, billed as a "technology and design update". The ship was drydocked in Genoa for ten days, allowing the contractor to refit public areas as well as some suites.

In March 2023, it was announced the ship was sold to Mitsui OSK Lines (MOL) and would complete all published itineraries through August 2024 and then the ship would be turned over to Mitsui Ocean Cruises.

The last cruise of the ship under the Seabourn line began on 2 September 2024. The ship arrived at Yokohama, its final farewell cruise destination, on 26 September 2024. Afterwards, it was handed over to the new owner. The official renaming occurred on 7 December.

=== Operational history ===
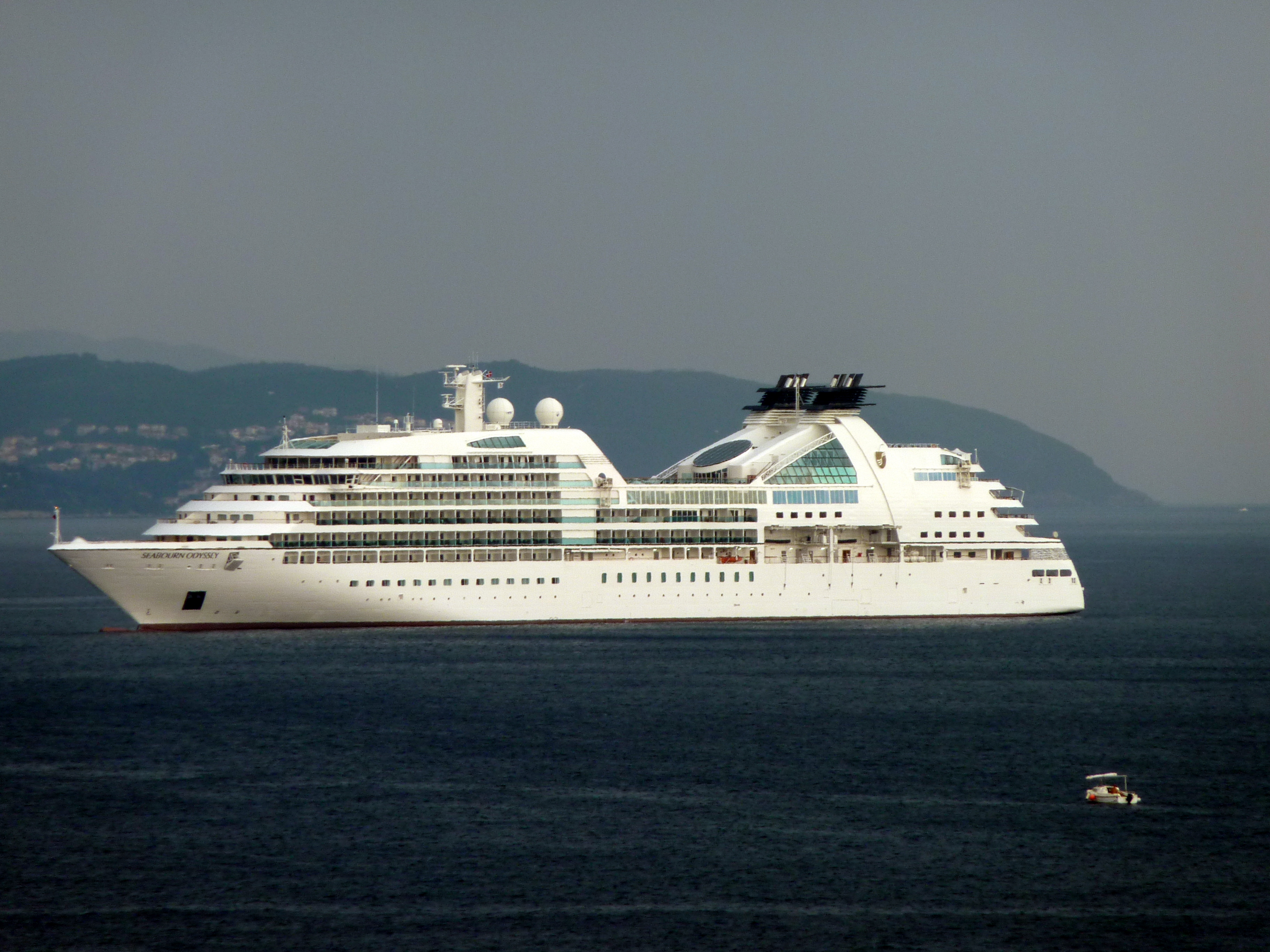
Seabourn Odyssey seen at Monaghan, Ireland

On 24 June 2008, Seabourn announced that they had appointed Captain Karlo Buer to be the ship's commander. The ship sailed on her first trip with guests on 25 June 2009, the day after her naming ceremony. The maiden voyage was a 14-night cruise to Istanbul. Its first season was spent in the Mediterranean Sea.

The ship's maiden World Cruise begun on 5 January 2010 and was scheduled to visit 42 ports over 108 days.

== Passenger amenities ==
The ship includes 11 decks with two swimming pools, six outdoor whirlpools, a spa and a marina. The Retreat features a nine-hole mini golf course, a giant chess board and shuffleboard. Onboard are four restaurants. At the time of its launch, Seabourn claimed that the ship had "the largest spa on any luxury vessel at 11,400 square feet" and one of the highest ratios of space onboard per guest.
