= Anastasios Kyriakides =

Greek-American businessman

Anastasios "Takis" Kyriakides
- Born: December 17, 1946 (age 79); Athens, Greece
- Education: Florida International University
- Occupations: CEO and founder, netTALK Maritime
- Spouse: Maria Kyriakides

Anastasios "Takis" Kyriakides (born December 17, 1946) is a Greek-American businessman and inventor. He is the founder and chief executive officer of NT Connect Holdings Inc. Kyriakides holds several patents and has founded multiple companies, including Lexicon Corporation, Mylex Corporation, Regency Cruises Line, netTALK CONNECT, and netTALK Maritime.

== Biography ==
=== Early life and education ===
Anastasios Kyriakides was born in Athens, Greece, on December 17, 1946. He later immigrated to the United States and received a Bachelor of Science degree in business from Florida International University in 1975.

=== Career ===
In the 1970s, Kyriakides invented and patented the LK3000, the first handheld language translation machine, a consumer electronics device that translated words from English into 12 different languages. In 1978, he appeared as a guest on The Merv Griffin Show to discuss his invention.

In 1979, Kyriakides founded the Lexicon Corporation, a NASDAQ-listed company (ticker symbol: LEX), to further develop and market the LK3000. Lexicon was ultimately acquired by Nixdorf Computer of Germany.

In 1983, he founded Mylex Corporation to develop and produce the first handheld optical scanner and VGA card for personal computers. He served as the company's president and chairman. Mylex stock was traded on the NASDAQ under the ticker symbol MYLX until it became a wholly owned subsidiary of IBM.

In 1984, Kyriakides and William Schanz founded Regency Cruises, which was listed on the NASDAQ under the ticker symbol SHIP. Kyriakides served as chairman and secretary, while Schanz served as president. The cruise line's fleet included, at various times, the Regent Jewel, Regent Rainbow, Regent Sea, Regent Spirit, Regent Star, and Regent Sun.

In January 1987, Kyriakides stepped down from his position at Regency Cruises to launch Sea Venture Cruises. He also established A.N.K. Marine Enterprises, a company that acquired passenger ships, converted them into cruise ships, and chartered them to cruise lines such as Sea Venture Cruises. A.N.K. acquired the Taygetos in June 1987, renaming it Sea Venture. It subsequently acquired the Prinses Paola in March 1988, renaming it Tropicana. (Note: M/V Tropicana ship specifications) Sea Venture Cruises also established a subsidiary, Tropicana Cruises, to operate daily cruises from Miami to Bimini, Bahamas. In November 1988, A.N.K. acquired the Wawel passenger ferry from Polferries, renaming it Calypso. (Note: SS Calypso ship specifications)

In 1991, Kyriakides founded Seawind Cruise Line and served as its chairman and CEO.

Kyriakides later founded NT Connect Holdings Inc. and netTALK Maritime, and presently serves as their chief executive officer. He is also the co-inventor of the netTALK DUO, a consumer electronics VoIP device used for making telephone calls over an internet connection.

== Accolades ==
In 1987, the Wolfson Campus at Miami Dade College in downtown Miami dedicated the Kyriakides Plaza to the family in recognition of their philanthropic support to the college.

In 2008, Kyriakides was inducted into the Miami Dade College Hall of Fame for Entrepreneurship.

In 2016, Miami Dade College recognized Marisol L. Varela, Ed.D., M.S., as the recipient of the Anastasios and Maria Kyriakides Endowed Teaching Chair.

In 2020, Miami Dade College announced the Anastasios and Maria Kyriakides Endowed Teaching Chair and recognized this select group of faculty as exemplary professionals. In 2021, the college introduced Kimberly Carter as the new recipient of the Anastasios and Maria Kyriakides Endowed Teaching Chair. The Miami Dade College Endowed Teaching Chair program annually recognizes outstanding faculty who continuously strive to fulfill MDC's mission.

== See also ==
- Regency Cruises
