= Mylex =

American computer company

Mylex Corporation
- Company type: Public
- Industry: Computer
- Founded: May 1983; 42 years ago in Miami, Florida, United States
- Founder: Anastasios Kyriakides
- Defunct: September 1999; 25 years ago
- Fate: Acquired by IBM; later acquired by LSI Logic in 2002
- Headquarters: Fremont, California, United States (1987–1999)
- Products: Expansion cards; Peripherals; RAID controllers
- Number of employees: 397 (1997, peak)
- Website: mylex.com at the Wayback Machine (archived December 10, 1997)

Mylex Corporation was an American computer company active from 1983 to 1999. The company mainly produced peripherals and expansion cards for personal computers—chiefly the IBM Personal Computer—for the bulk of its existence, although it also produced complete motherboards. In the mid-1990s the company focused on designing and manufacturing RAID controllers, eventually cornering 75 percent of the RAID controller market. In 1999, the company was acquired by and made a subsidiary of IBM for approximately $240 million. In 2002, IBM sold their Mylex division to LSI Logic for an undisclosed amount.

== History ==
=== Foundation (1983–1985) ===
Mylex Corporation was founded in May 1983 by Anastasios Kyriakides, a business mogul based in Miami, Florida. Kyriakides had previously founded Lexicon Corporation of Fort Lauderdale, a maker of telecommunications equipment for mainframe computers, in 1976, selling it off in 1979 after it had gone public. In October 1983, shortly after its foundation, Mylex filed to go public, raising $3.5 million in capital with its IPO. Kyriakides would later go on to found Regency Cruises, a cruise line company, in 1984.

Kyriakides founded Mylex to capitalize on the growing market of expansion cards and peripherals for the IBM Personal Computer, which IBM had introduced in August 1981. One of Mylex's first products was the Chairman, a multifunction parallel communications card and a video controller card capable of outputting monochrome and color graphics to CGA monitors. In 1986, the company developed its own bespoke graphics adapter card, the Advanced Graphics Adapter (ADA), for the IBM PC, aimed at CAD/CAM buyers. Based on Intel's 80186 microprocessor–microcontroller and compatible with NEC's MultiSync monitor, the ADA could display color graphics at a maximum resolution of 800 by 600 pixels. Mylex soon found corporate customers in IBM themselves and the Orlando-based technology company Systeme Corporation, who contributed to 96 percent of Mylex's total unit sales in 1985.

=== Move to California and motherboards (1985–1993) ===
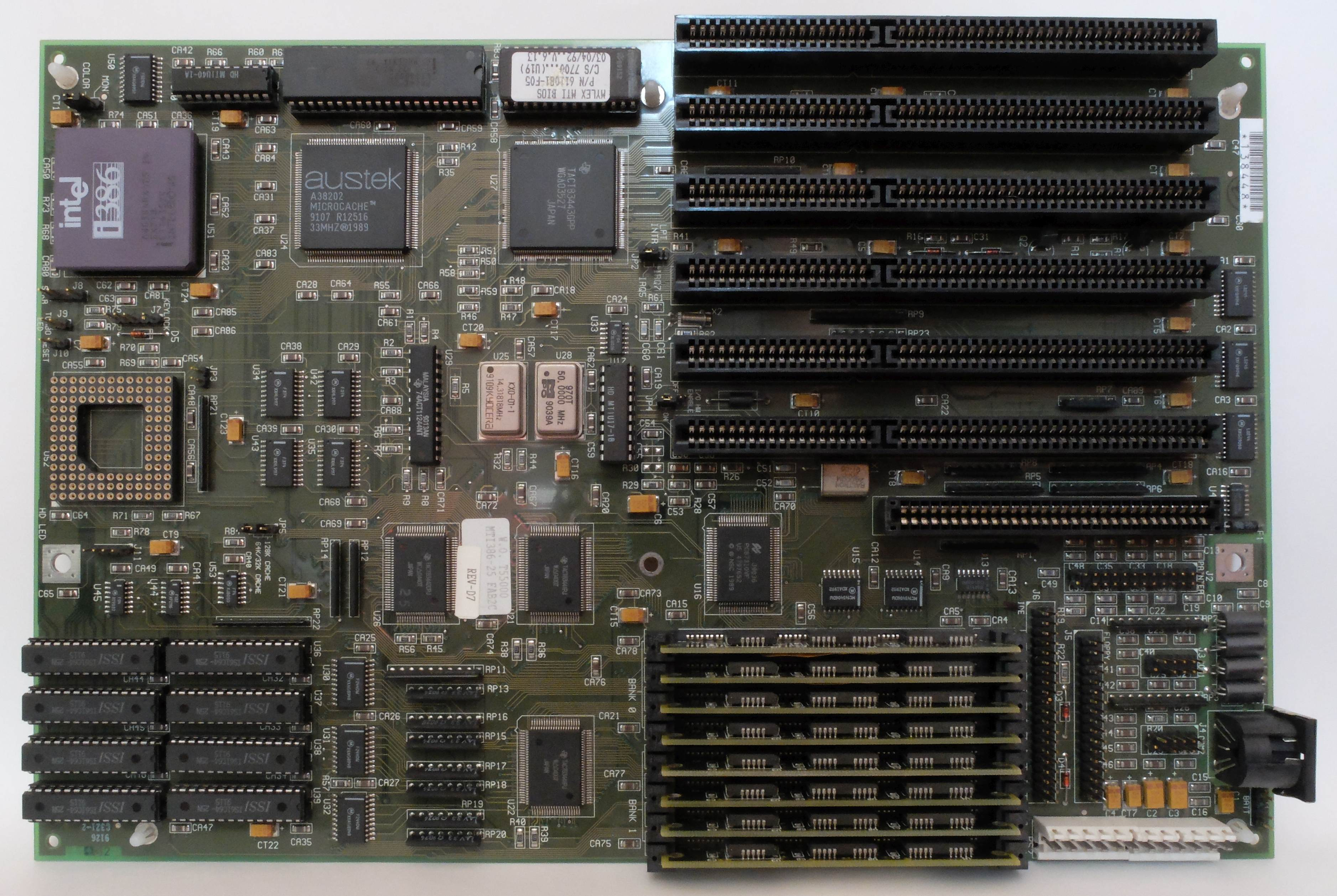
A i386-based Mylex motherboard from 1992

Mylex employed 50 workers by August 1985. That year, the company was issued an extensive patent by the USPTO for a handheld scanner, beginning work on a PC-compatible peripheral based on the patent around the same time. Dubbed the Text Scanner, it allowed the user to scan a line of text and have it transcribed near-instantaneously through optical character recognition. While Mylex hoped that the Text Wand would be a breakout hit and make a name for the company in the crowded personal computer market, a sales slump in 1986 caused by IBM and Systeme pulling out orders of Mylex's other products nearly bankrupted the company instead. In December 1986, Kyriakides relinquished 32 percent of his shares in Mylex to an investor group led by M. Akram Chowdry, chairman of Prime Circuit Technology of San Jose, California. Immediately afterward, Kyriakides resigned as president and chairman of Mylex, his role replaced by Chowdry; Kyriakides remained on the board of directors with a remaining 10 percent stake in Mylex.

Mylex moved their headquarters from Miami to Fremont, California, over the summer of 1987. In 1988, Mylex began offering complete motherboards for IBM PCs and compatibles. These were intended as upgrades to XT- and AT-class computers whose motherboards featured Intel's 8088, Intel 8086, and 80286 processors; Mylex's boards featured Intel's newer i386, i386SX, and i486 processors. Mylex's motherboards did not sell very well, and by 1991 the company's large inventory of unrealized i386 and i486 processors were rendered obsolete, contributing $800,000 to a $1.2 million net loss in the third quarter of that year, based on diminution of the chips' value combined with the cost of warehousing them. The company's net income plummeted from $2.1 million in March 1991 to $487,300 in November 1991, an 81 percent decrease; sales meanwhile increased $35.6 million to $45.7 million (a 28 percent increased) during the same period. Sales of their motherboards remained stagnant into 1993, at which point the company began looking at other segments of the personal computer market.

=== RAID controllers (1993–1999) ===
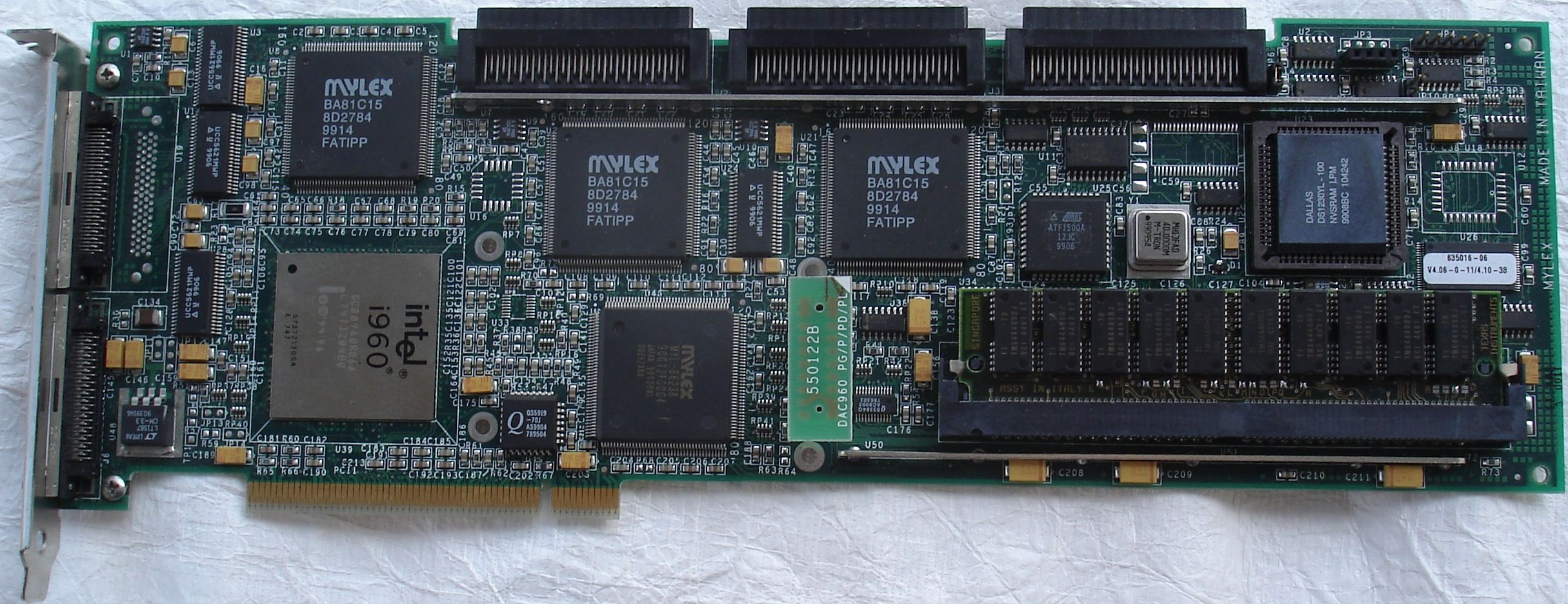
A Mylex DAC960PG, three-channel Ultra SCSI RAID controller from 1993

In 1993, the company began its pivot to designing and selling RAID controllers and LAN management software to appeal to the file server and workstation markets, finding much more success here than in their earlier ventures. By the end of 1995, Mylex cornered 75 percent of the RAID controller market and exceeded $100 million in revenue. In December 1995, they announced their acquisition of Santa Clara, California–based BusLogic, Inc., in a stock swap valuated at roughly US$55 million. BusLogic's acquisition was finalized in late January 1996, its shareholders netting additional stock options post-acquisition, increasing the terms of the sale to over $67.9 million. The acquisition of BusLogic was a success for Mylex, the company's revenue growing to $173 million in 1996, helped along by the expansion of their RAID product lines and the production capability of BusLogic, whose Santa Clara plant was retained for manufacturing Mylex's products. Employment peaked at 397 in July 1997.

Mylex's stock price dropped between June and July 1996, the company hurt by three of its largest companies, among them Hewlett-Packard and IBM, either deciding to develop their own RAID controllers in-house or switching to rival Adaptec around the same time. In July 1997, the company laid off 27 of their 397 employees and announced the imminent shuttering of the old BusLogic plant. Between 1997 and 1998, Mylex opened up a research and development facility in Boulder, Colorado.

=== Sale to IBM and LSI Logic (1999–2002) ===
In 1998, Mylex earned revenues of $135.7 million. In July 1999, IBM announced that they would acquire all of Mylex for roughly $240 million in cash. The acquisition was completed in September 1999, IBM keeping Mylex as a wholly owned subsidiary and the latter keeping its Fremont and Boulder facilities.

In July 2002, IBM sold their Mylex division to LSI Logic for an undisclosed amount. IBM's divestiture of Mylex was completed in December 2002, its assets and its eight remaining employees in Boulder being absorbed into LSI's Logic Storage Systems division based in Tucson, Arizona, that month.
