= Regency Cruises =

Greek cruise company between 1984-1985

- Industry: Cruises; Hospitality; Travel; Tourism
- Founded: 1984
- Founder: Anastasios Kyriakides and William Schanz
- Defunct: 1995
- Headquarters: New York, New York
- Area served: Worldwide
- Products: Cruises
- Parent: Lelakis Group

Regency Cruises was a Greek cruise company operating former ocean liners in the late 1980s and early 1990s, formed by Anastasios Kyriakides and William Schanz.

== History ==
The company began in 1984 with its first ship, the Regent Sea, a former transatlantic ship built for Swedish American Line.

In 1986, the company bought three container ships with the intent to completely rebuild them into cruise ships. The Axel Johnson was to be renamed Regent Sun, and the Annie Johnson was to be renamed Regent Moon. Regency Cruises did not proceed with the conversions, and the ships were sold to Costa Cruises. The third vessel, Margaret Johnson, intended to become Regent Sky, was instead sold to the breakers, with her steering gear and engines used for the refit of the recently purchased Regent Star.

In 1988, the cruise line purchased the Royal Odyssey from Royal Cruise Line, and renamed it the Regent Sun. In 1989, the line purchased the unfinished hull of Stena Baltica of Stena Lines, with the intent that the ship would become the line's first new build. Completion would be delayed many times, and the ship would only reach 60% completion by the time Regency went bankrupt. By 1992, the line had six ships, adding Regent Spirit and Regent Rainbow to the fleet that year.

In 1994, the line purchased the former car ferry M/S Canguro Verde, renaming her the Regent Jewel, and invested a significant amount of money in its acquisition and refit.

In 1995, Regency Cruises arranged to charter the Princess Cruises ship Fair Princess. Regency planned to operate the ship as the Regent Isle for the start of the 1996 cruise season.

=== Bankruptcy ===
On October 29, 1995, Regency Cruises announced its shutdown. Warning signs were seen when several sailings were canceled because the line did not receive financing for the purchase of Princess Cruises' Fair Princess in mid-October. Travel agents were also seeing late commissions on bookings, the company's president Ron Santangelo had resigned, and the Regent Rainbow had been arrested in Tampa. A primary contributor to the bankruptcy was the $31.4 million investment in 1994 for the acquisition and refit of the Regent Jewel.

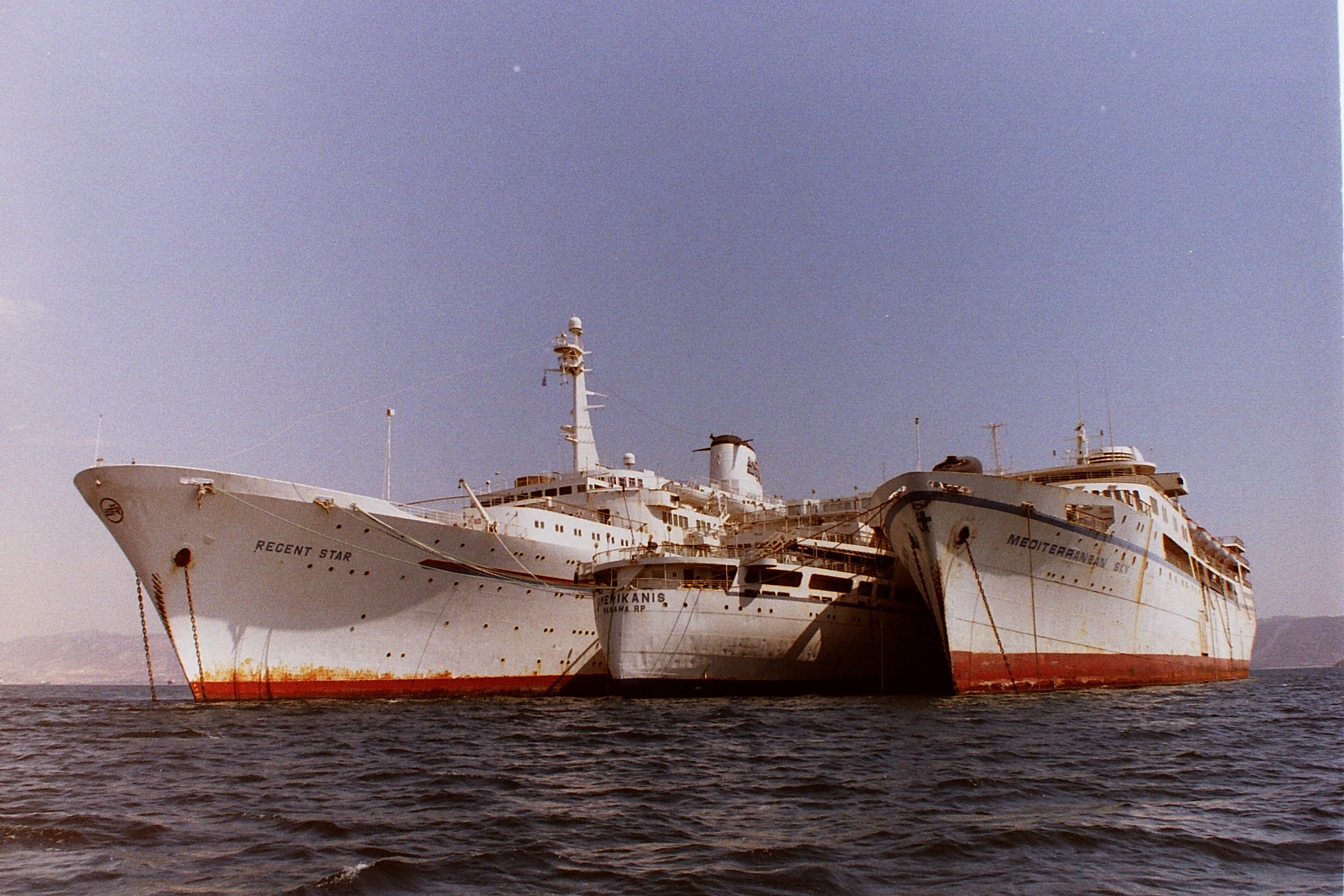
The cruise ships Regent Star, Amerikanis, and Mediterranean Sky laid up in Eleusis Bay in 2000

Following bankruptcy, half of the ships would go on to sail for other cruise lines, while the Regent Sea, Regent Sun, and Regent Star never returned to service. The under-construction Regent Sky was never completed and was eventually scrapped in 2012.

== Fleet ==
Ship	Image	Built	In service for Regency	Status	Notes
Regent Sea		1957	1984-1995	Sank on way to scrapyard in 2001	Built as the Gripsholm for Swedish American Line
Regent Star		1956	1986-1995	Scrapped in 2004	Built as the Statendam for Holland America Line
Regent Sun		1964	1988–1995	Sank on way to scrapyard in 2001	Built as the Shalom for Zim Lines
Regent Rainbow		1958	1992–1995	Scrapped in 2012	Built as the Santa Rosa for Grace Line
Regent Spirit		1962	1992–1995	Scrapped in 2009	Built as the Anna Nery for Cia Nacional de Nav Costeira Autarquia Federal
Regent Jewel		1967	1993-1994	Scrapped in 2013	Built as the car ferry Canguro Verde
Never entered service
Regent Sun		1969	1986–1987 (owned)	Scrapped 2014	Purchased by Regency Cruises to be refitted into cruise ships, but sold before any work was carried out
Regent Moon		1969	1986–1988 (owned)	Scrapped 2012	Purchased by Regency Cruises to be refitted into cruise ships, but sold before any work was carried out.
Regent Sky		1985	1989-1995 (hull owned)	Scrapped in 2012	Ship under construction, was 60% complete when Regency Cruises filed for bankruptcy. Never completed.
Regent Isle		1956	1995 (planned)	Scrapped in 2006	Built as the RMS Carinthia for Cunard Line. Chartered by Regency Cruises, but never entered service due to bankruptcy.
