= MS Costa Allegra =

Cruise ship built in 1969

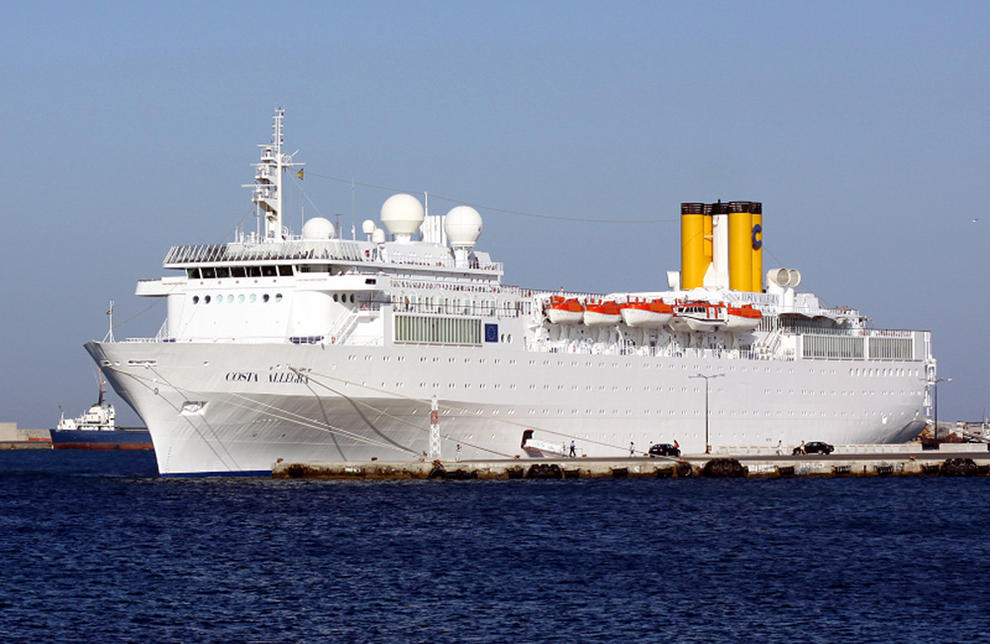
- Costa Allegra at Split in 2011

History
- Name: Annie Johnson (1969-1986); Regent Moon (1986-1988); Alexandra (1988-1992); Costa Allegra (1992-2012); Santa Cruise (2012)
- Owner: Rederi AB Nordstjernan (1969-1986); Regency Cruises (1986-1988); Compania Naviera Panalexandra (1988-1990); Costa Crociere (1990-2012); Themis Maritime Ltd (2012)
- Operator: Johnson Line (1969–1986); Costa Crociere (1992–2012)
- Port of registry: Stockholm, Sweden (1969–1986); Limassol, Cyprus (1986–1988); Panama City, Panama (1988–1990); Naples, Italy (1990–1994); Monrovia, Liberia (1994–2000); Genoa, Italy (2000–2012); Freetown, Sierra Leone (2012)
- Builder: Wärtsilä Turku Shipyard, Turku, Finland (original); T. Mariotti, Genoa, Italy (rebuild)
- Yard number: 1170
- Launched: 29 April 1969
- Completed: 1969
- Acquired: 4 December 1969
- Maiden voyage: 5 December 1969
- In service: 1969
- Out of service: 27 February 2012
- Refit: 1986–1992
- Identification: Call sign: ICRA; IMO number: 6916885; MMSI no.: 247816000
- Fate: Scrapped at Aliağa, Turkey in 2012

General characteristics (as built)
- Type: Container ship
- Tonnage: 16,289 GRT; 10,155 NRT; 16,080 DWT
- Length: 174.20 m (571.5 ft)
- Beam: 25.75 m (84.5 ft)
- Draught: 10.39 m (34.1 ft)
- Installed power: 2 × Wärtsilä-Pielstick 16PC2V; 2 × Wärtsilä-Pielstick 12PC2V; 19,139 kW (combined)
- Propulsion: Two controllable pitch propellers
- Speed: 23 knots (43 km/h; 26 mph)
- Capacity: 744 TEU; 12 passengers
- Crew: 30

General characteristics (1992)
- Type: Cruise ship
- Tonnage: 28,430 GT; 11,973 NT; 7,391 DWT
- Length: 187.69 m (615.8 ft)
- Beam: 25.75 m (84.5 ft)
- Draught: 8.20 m (26.9 ft)
- Decks: 8 (passenger accessible)
- Installed power: 4 × Wärtsilä 6R46; 19,123 kW (combined)
- Propulsion: Two propellers
- Speed: 19 knots (35 km/h; 22 mph)
- Capacity: 820 passengers (lower berths); 1,072 passengers (all berths)

Costa Allegra, formerly Annie Johnson, was a cruise ship owned by the Italy-based costa Cruises, one of many subsidiaries owned by Costa's parent company Carnival Corporation. She was built in 1969 by the Wärtsilä Turku Shipyard in Turku, Finland, as a container ship for the Johnson Line services of Sweden-based Rederi AB Nordstjernan. In 1986 she was sold to Regency Cruises with the intention of being converted into a cruise ship as Regent Moon, but she was laid up instead. In 1988 she was sold to Compania Naviera Panalexandra and renamed Alexandra but continued laid up. In 1990, the ship was acquired by Costa Cruises and rebuilt into a cruise ship at the T. Mariotti shipyard in Genoa, Italy. She entered service as Costa Allegra in 1992.

Costa Allegra suffered a generator fire while off the coast of Africa approximately 200 miles southwest of the Seychelles on 27 February 2012 and was taken into tow toward the island of Mahé in the Seychelles Islands the following day, a journey of several days. She was later renamed Santa Cruise and sold for breaking in Aliaga, Turkey. Prior to beaching at the scrapyard, her yellow funnel, a trademark of Costa Crociere, was painted white.

== Career ==
=== Annie Johnson ===
Annie Johnson was the second in a series of five container ships built by the Wärtsilä Turku Shipyard in Finland for the Swedish shipping company Rederi AB Nordstjernan. She was launched on 29 April 1969 and delivered to her owners on 4 December of the same year, entering service on the same date.

From 1969 until 1986, Annie Johnson was used as in cargo services by Rederi AB Nordstjernan. On 8 August 1986 the ship was sold to the Greece-based Regency Cruises with the intention of being rebuilt as a cruise ship. With this aim in mind, she was renamed Regent Moon. Her sister ship MS Axel Johnson was sold to Regency Cruises at the same time, renamed Regent Sun, also with the intention of being converted into a cruise ship. These plans were never realised, and Regent Moon was laid up in Perama, Greece. In May 1988 Regent Moon was sold to Compania Naviera Panalexandra and renamed Alexandra, but continued laid up until 1990 when she was sold to Costa Crociere.

=== Costa Allegra ===
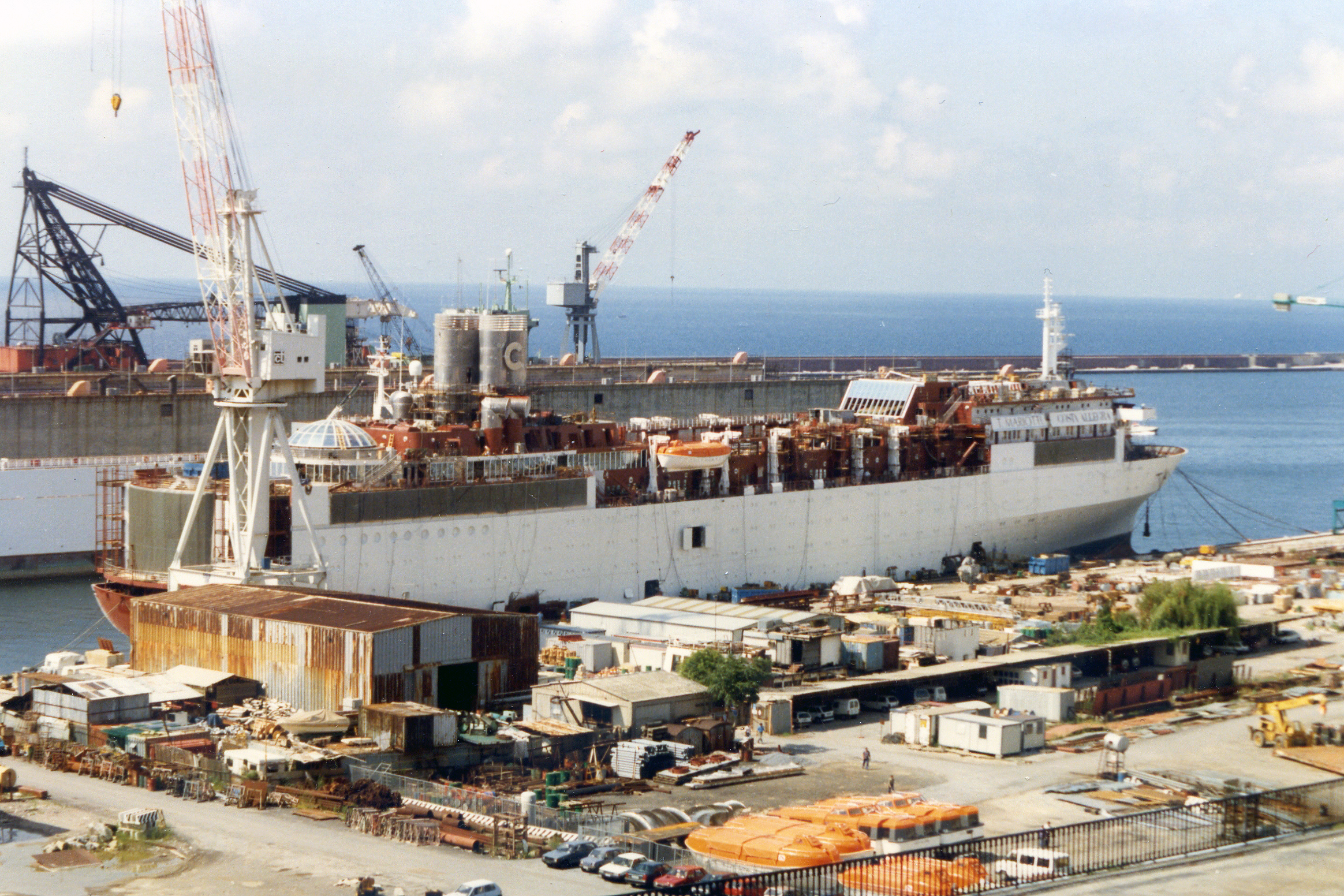
Costa Allegra during her rebuilding at Genoa on August 13, 1992.

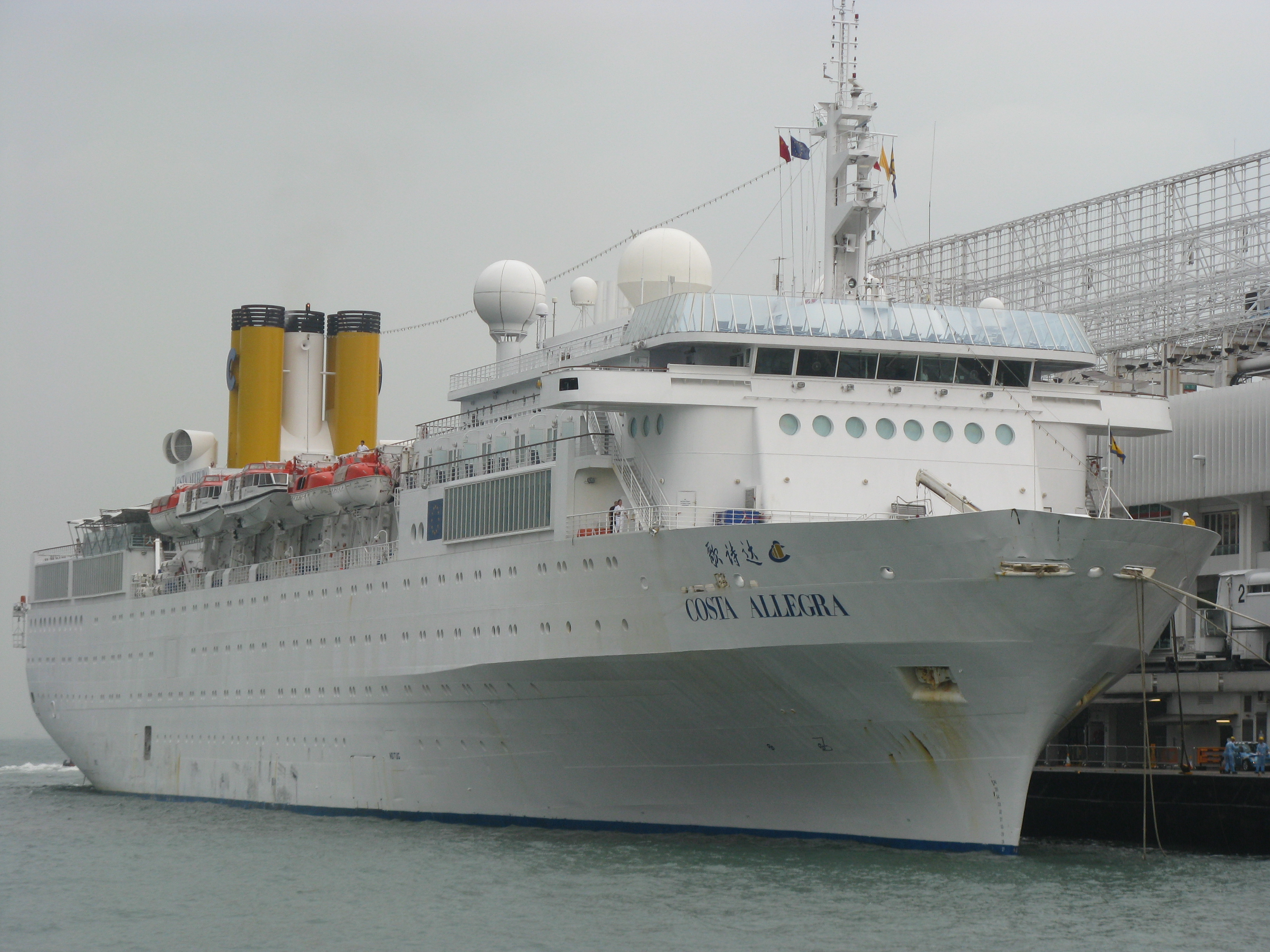
Costa Allegra in Hong Kong, 2009

Costa Crociere acquired Regent Sun which was renamed Italia in the interim, in 1988 and had her conversion into a cruise ship realised, with the ship being delivered in July 1990 as Costa Marina. Following this Costa Crociere acquired Alexandra on 28 August 1990 for conversion into a cruise ship at the T. Mariotti shipyard in Genoa, Italy, the same shipyard that had rebuilt Costa Marina. Work on Alexandra commenced on 4 September 1990. She received an entirely new superstructure in the same style as that of Costa Marina, as well as new engines. However, unlike Costa Marina, Alexandra was also lengthened by 13.4 metres (44 ft 0 in) when rebuilt. Although originally planned to be renamed Costa Azzurra, the ship was eventually named Costa Allegra and delivered to Costa Cruises on 16 November 1992.

Costa Allegra entered service with Costa Crociere on 23 November 1992 with a cruise from Genoa to St. Thomas in the Caribbean. During the early years of her service with Costa she sailed in the Mediterranean during the Northern Hemisphere summer season, relocating to the Caribbean for the winter. In 2006 the ship was relocated for cruising out of China. At the same time her interiors were refurbished to better suit the Asian cruise market. Her ports of departure in Asia were Singapore and Hong Kong. Countries visited included China, South Korea, Japan, Vietnam, the Philippines, Malaysia, Thailand and Indonesia.

In 2010, the ship was relocated back to Europe, and her Asian itineraries were replaced by Costa Classica and Costa Romantica. In an agreement with TMR of Marseilles, Costa Cruises, who had owned the Paquet Cruises brand since 1996, used Costa Allegra, marketed in France under the name Allegra and the Paquet Cruises brand, for four spring cruises and seven cruises in autumn of 2010. For these cruises, Costa Allegra featured a French master, cruise director, maitres 'd, receptionists and two French chefs, one of whom, Jean Abauzit, served on board the renowned Mermoz, retired a decade earlier.

==== 2012 fire ====
During the morning of 27 February 2012, a fire broke out in the generator room. The fire was extinguished by the on-board fire-suppression system and there were no injuries, but the ship was left without power and adrift about 200 miles southwest of the Seychelles. She was towed by the French tuna-fishing vessel Trevignon, from the Compagnie Française du Thon Océanique (CFTO) based in Concarneau, to Mahé in the Seychelles for repair and evacuation of the passengers. 1049 people, 636 passengers and 413 crew members of various nationalities were on board. Costa Cruises announced Costa Voyager would assume Costa Allegra's planned voyages from 18 March to 1 July. Following on 9 March 2012, it was announced that the Costa Allegra would not return to service with Costa and given to Themis Maritime Ltd ship company as Santa Cruise for scrapping at Aliaga, Turkey. Her story was a part of a feature on the scrapping operations of Aliaga in the January/February issue of Cruise Travel Magazine.

== Design ==
The eight decks on Costa Allegra were named after famous impressionist painters. A three deck high glass atrium was the centre of the ship. Works of art were located throughout the ship.

Gallery

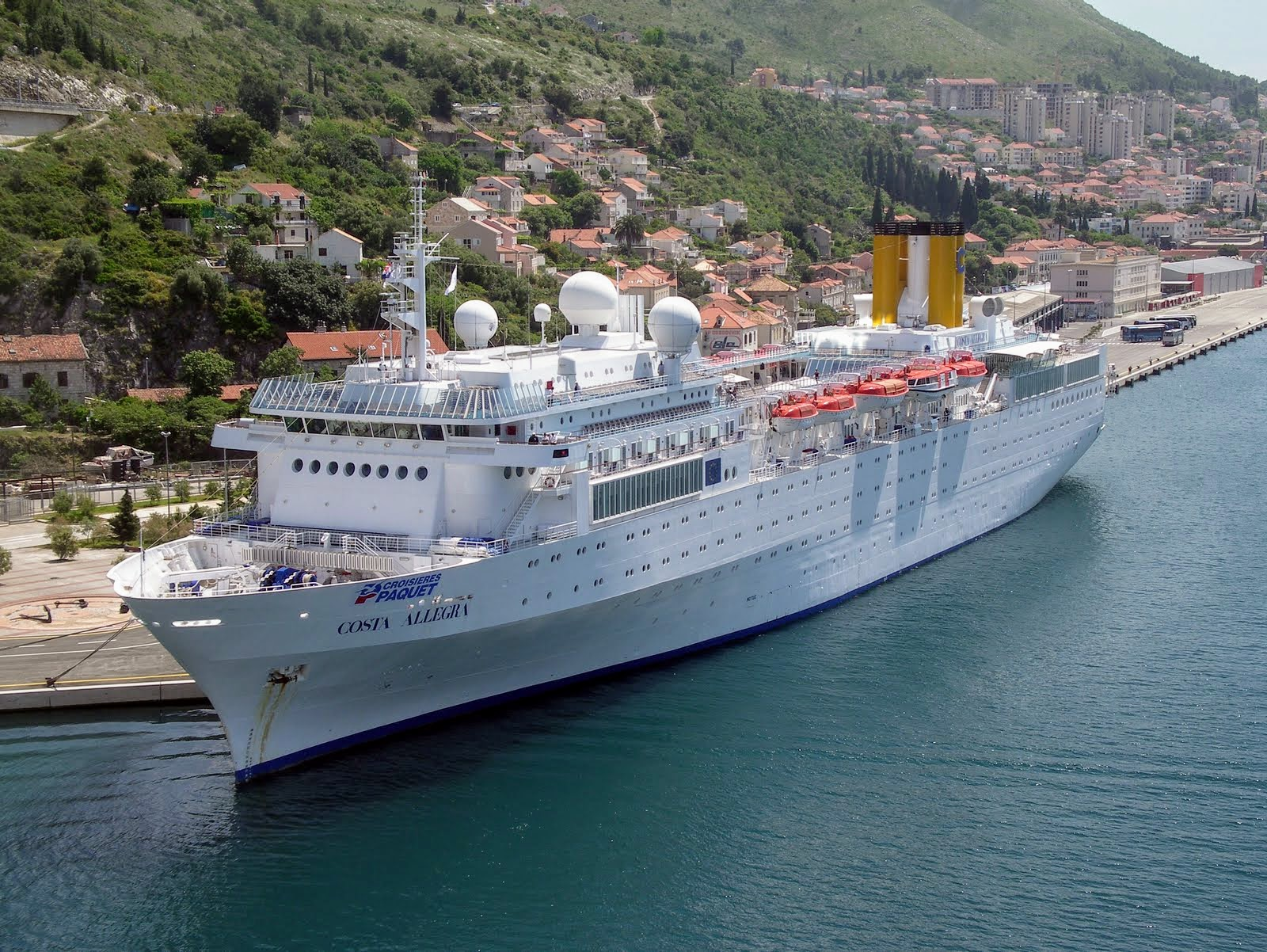
Costa Allegra in Dubrovnik.

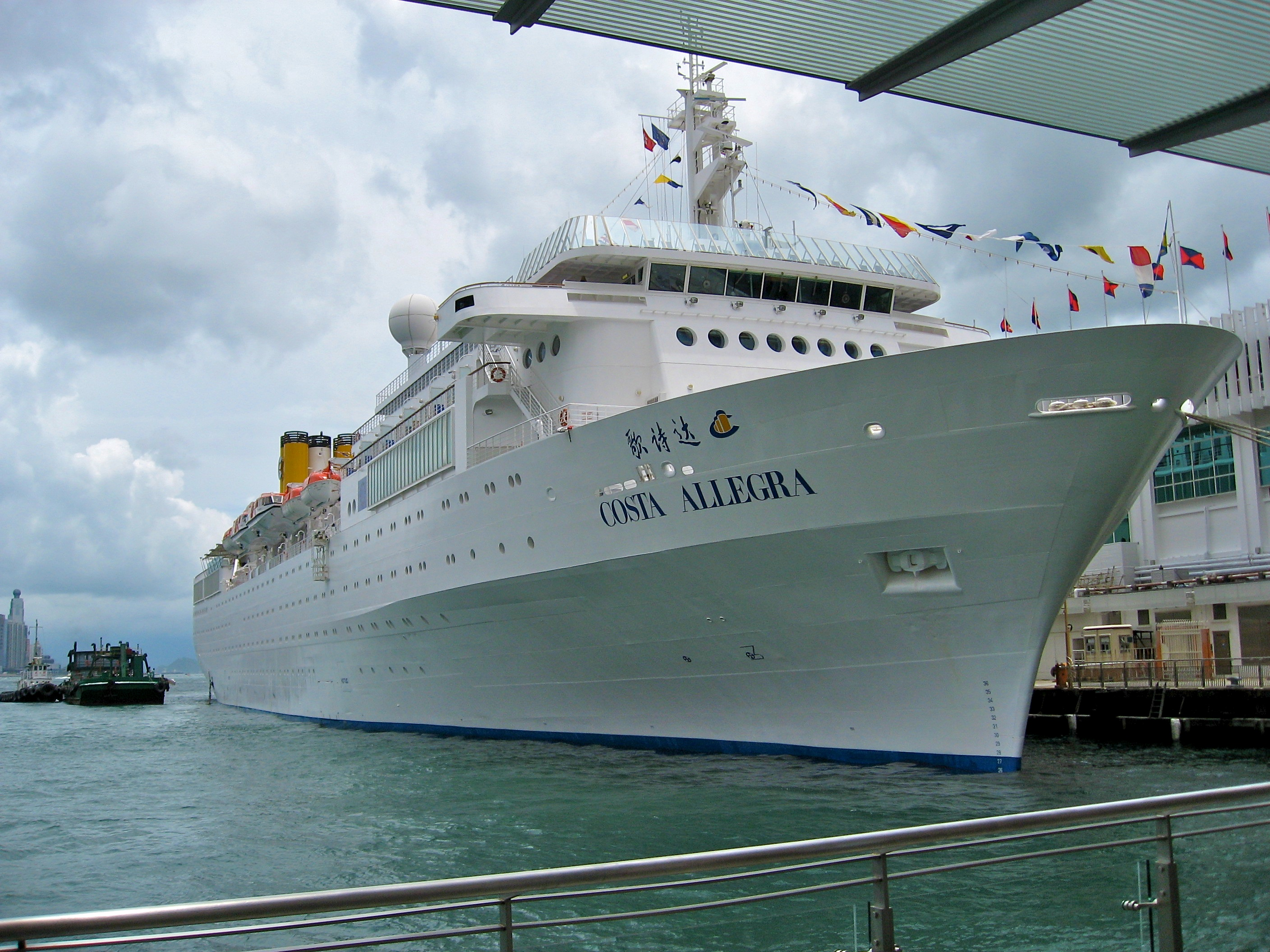
Costa Allegra in Hong Kong
