= MV Shelly =

History
- Name: Zlatograd (1973–99); Loti (1999–2002); Dora (2002–03); Shelly (2003–07)
- Namesake: Zlatograd, Bulgaria (1973–99)
- Port of registry: (Bulgaria) (1973–?); (Slovakia) (?–2007)
- Builder: Ivan Dimitrov shipyard, Ruse, Bulgaria
- Yard number: 15
- Completed: 1973
- Identification: IMO number: 7306673; Call sign OMJB
- Fate: Sank after collision 30 August 2007

General characteristics
- Tonnage: 1,599 GT
- Length: 80.8 m (265 ft)
- Beam: 11.9 m (39 ft)
- Propulsion: diesel engine, single screw
- Speed: 12 knots (22 km/h)

MV Shelly was a 1,599 GT cargo ship that was built in Bulgaria in 1973. She sank off the Mediterranean coast of Israel in 2007 after the 10,392 GT cruise ship CS Salamis Glory rammed her and broke her in two. Two of Shelly's crew were killed.

== Ship ==
The Ivan Dimitrov shipyard on the River Danube in Ruse, Bulgaria built the ship and launched her in 1973 as Zlatograd. She changed hands in 1999 and was renamed Loti. She changed hands again in 2002 and was renamed Dora. In 2003 Israeli owners bought her, renamed her Shelly and registered her in Slovakia. She was crewed not by Israelis but by other nationalities, mainly Slovaks and Ukrainians.

== Collision and sinking ==
On 30 August 2007, Shelly was at anchor about 1.6 nautical miles (3 km) off Israeli coast, near the port of Haifa, when at about 10pm she was accidentally rammed by the Cypriot passenger ship Salamis Glory, which had left port at Haifa several minutes before. Shelly sank quickly after the collision, which the Israel Broadcasting Authority said broke her in half. 11 crew members escaped, and most climbed aboard a rescue launch lowered by Salamis Glory and were subsequently rescued by the Israeli Navy. The rest were rescued by helicopter. The survivors refused to be taken to a local hospital for treatment. Salamis Glory subsequently returned to port in Haifa, showing slight damage to her hull. None of Salamis Glory's 700 or so passengers and crew was injured.

The remaining two crew members were declared missing, prompting a search and rescue operation involving six naval vessels, multiple aircraft and divers. 12 hours after the sinking their bodies were recovered from the wreck by divers in 20 metres (66 ft) of water. The dead were identified as the ship's Indonesian First Mate and Ukrainian engineer.

The vessel's sinking released an oil spill that moved down the coast, causing authorities to warn the public not to bathe at the nearby Zevulun beach.

On 31 August Salamis Lines, owners of Salamis Glory, arranged for 148 stranded Cypriot passengers from the ship to be flown back to Cyprus on a Cyprus Airways jet.

== Investigation ==
Israeli Police launched a full investigation into the cause of the accident, aided by Cypriot authorities. All of Salamis Glory's crew were interviewed. One possibility being considered was that there was a fault in the ship's navigation system, with some reports of a loss of steering control aboard Salamis Glory.
