= MS The Calypso =

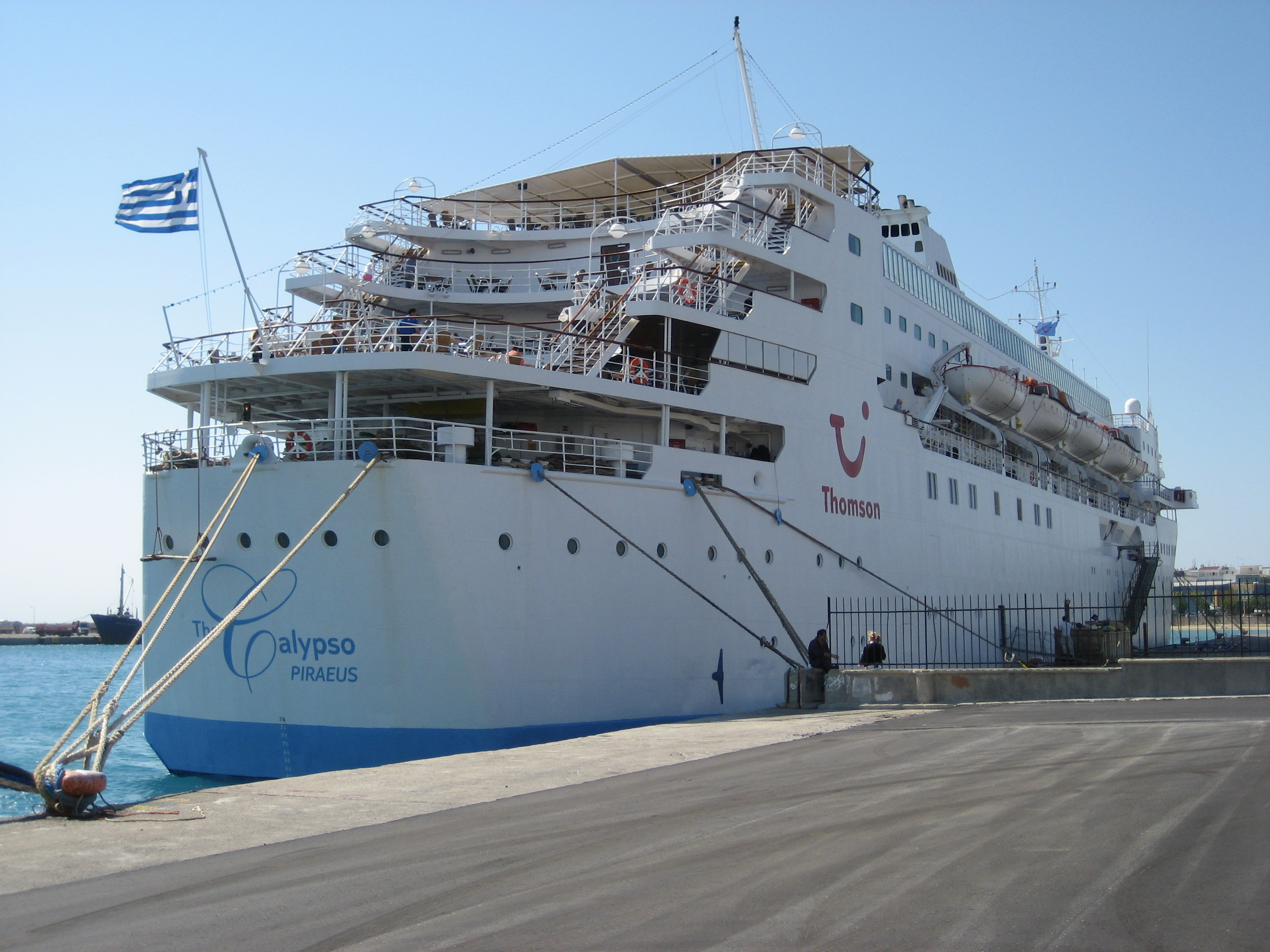
- The Calypso at Rhodes in 2008

History
- Name: 1967–1981: Canguro Verde; 1981–1989: Durr; 1989–1990: Ionian Harmony; 1990–1993: Sun Fiesta; 1993–1994: Regent Jewel; 1994–2007: Calypso; 2007–2013: The Calypso; 2013: Caly
- Operator: 1967–1974: Traghetti Sardi; 1974–1981: Società Linee Canguro; 1981–1989: Fayez Trading & Shipping; 1989–1990: Strintzis Lines; 1990–1992: Ferry Charter St. Thomas; 1992–1993: A Lelakis; 1993–1994: Regency Cruises; 1994–2000: Transocean Tours; 2000–2006: Louis Cruises; 2006–2009: Thomson Cruises; 2009–2010: Louis Cruises
- Port of registry: 1967–1981: Cagliari, Italy; 1981–1989: Jeddah, Saudi Arabia; 1989–1990: Piraeus, Greece; 1990–2000: Nassau, Bahamas; 2000–2006: Piraeus, Greece; 2006–2007: Limassol, Cyprus; 2007–2013: Piraeus, Greece; 2013: Basseterre, Saint Kitts and Nevis
- Builder: Fincantieri, Castellammare di Stabia, Italy
- Yard number: 645
- Launched: 23 April 1967
- Completed: 1967
- Maiden voyage: 1967
- In service: 1967
- Out of service: 2013
- Identification: Call sign: V4RU2; IMO number: 6715372
- Fate: Scrapped in Alang, India, 2013

General characteristics (after 1992 rebuild)
- Tonnage: 11,162 GT
- Length: 135.4 m (444 ft 3 in)
- Beam: 19.2 m (63 ft 0 in)
- Draught: 6.3 m (20 ft 8 in)
- Decks: 8
- Installed power: Two Fiat diesel engines
- Propulsion: Two shafts; controllable pitch propellers; Bow and stern thrusters
- Speed: 16 knots (30 km/h; 18 mph)
- Capacity: 596 passengers

The Calypso was a cruise liner owned by Louis Cruises, and was under charter to Thomson Cruises, part of TUI Travel at one time. Earlier names of the ship were Canguro Verde, Durr, Ionian Harmony, Sun Fiesta, Regent Jewel, and Calypso In April 2013, it was beached in Alang, India, for scrapping.

== Facilities ==
- 4 bars, 2 restaurants, library w/ internet, bistro, disco, casino, library, swimming pool, fitness center, sauna, massage room, fashion shops. Cabin electricity supply 110 volts.
- 243 cabins
- 486 passengers on lower berths
- 740 passengers including upper berths

== Incidents ==
On 6 May 2006 at 4 am the starboard engine caught fire 16 miles (26 km) off Eastbourne while it was carrying 708 people from Tilbury to Saint Peter Port on Guernsey. The crew put the fire out. The passengers meanwhile were assemble in the designated emergency stations, which however did not need to be launched. The fire caused extensive damage to the ship and she was out of action through the early part of the (northern hemisphere) summer cruising season.
