= MS Costa Marina =

Former cruise ship

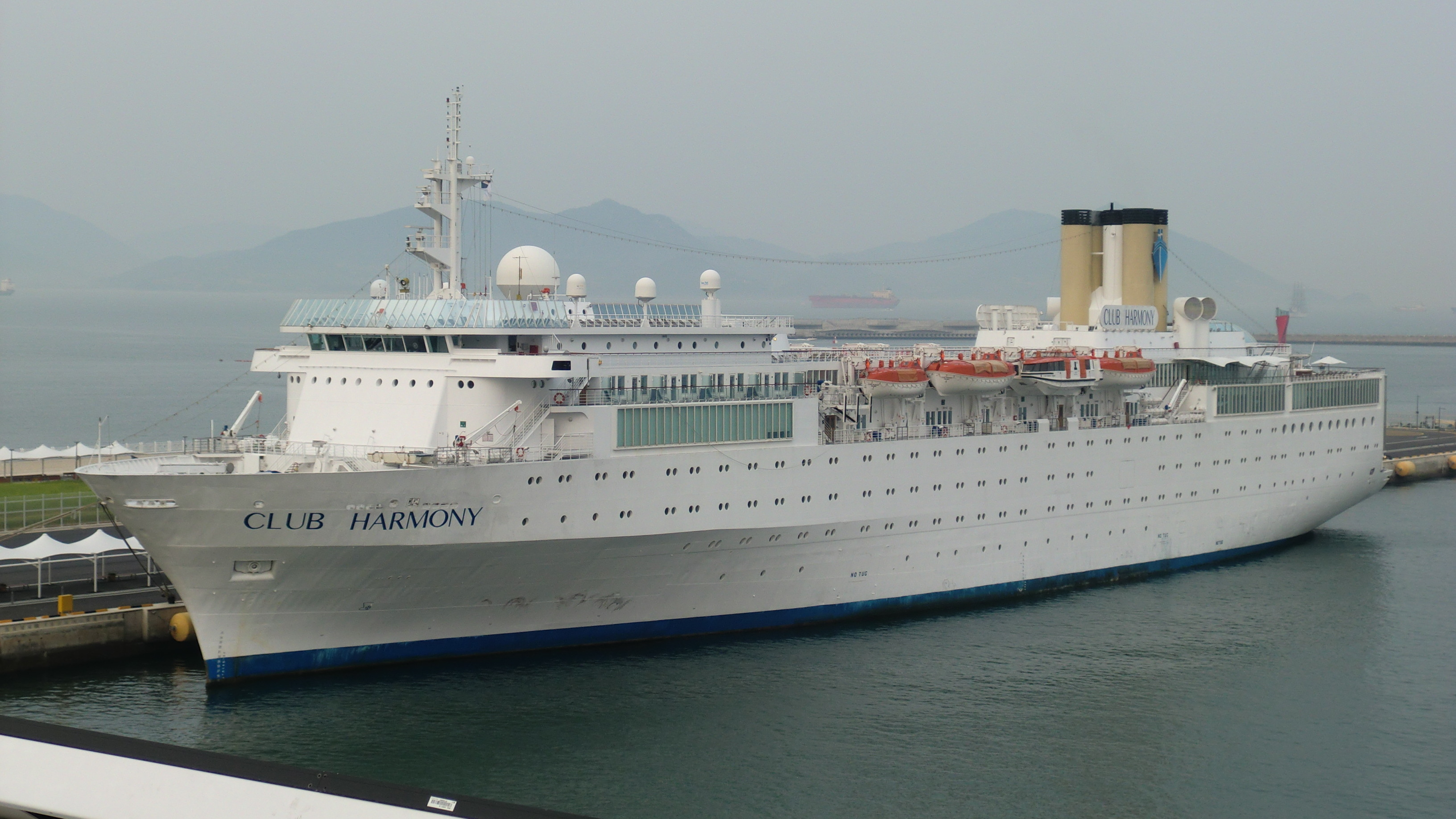
- The Costa Marina as Club Harmony

History
- Name: Axel Johnson (1969–1986); Regent Sun (1986–1987); Italia (1987–1988); Costa Marina (1988–2011); Harmony Princess (2011–2012); Club Harmony (2012–2014); Harmony 1 (2014–2014)
- Namesake: Axel Johnson
- Owner: Rederi AB Nordstjernan (1969–1986); Regency Cruises (1986–1987); Carnival Corporation & plc (1988–2011); Polaris Shipping (2011–2014)
- Operator: Johnson Line (1969–1986); Costa Cruises (1988–2011); Harmony Cruise (2012–2014)
- Port of registry: Genoa, Italy (1988–2011); Majuro, Marshall Islands (2011–2014); Saint Kitts and Nevis (2014–2014)
- Builder: Wärtsilä Turku Shipyard, Turku, Finland
- Yard number: 1169
- Launched: 16 January 1969
- Completed: June 1969
- Acquired: 1969
- Maiden voyage: 1969
- Identification: Call sign: IBNC; IMO number: 6910544; MMSI no.: 247818000
- Fate: Scrapped at Alang, India in 2014.

General characteristics
- Tonnage: 25,500 GT; 10,834 NT; 6,121 DWT
- Length: 174.3 m (572 ft)
- Beam: 25.8 m (85 ft)
- Draught: 7.9 m (26 ft)
- Decks: 8 (passenger-accessible)
- Speed: 20.5 knots (38.0 km/h; 23.6 mph)
- Capacity: 760 passengers 400 crew

MS Costa Marina was a cruise ship, last owned by Polaris Shipping and operated by Harmony Cruises.

== History ==
The MS Costa Marina was originally built in 1969 as the container ship Axel Johnson by the Wärtsilä Turku Shipyard in Turku, Finland for the Sweden-based Rederi AB Nordstjernan and operated on their Johnson Line services. In 1986 she was sold to Regency Cruises with the intention of being converted into a cruise ship operating under the name Regent Sun, but she was laid up instead. In 1987 she was sold to Navyclub Italia and renamed Italia, but continued to be laid up. In 1988 the ship was acquired by Costa Cruises, renamed Costa Marina, and rebuilt into a cruise ship at the T. Mariotti shipyard in Genoa, Italy. She entered service as Costa Marina in 1990. From 2002 she was marketed more towards German passengers.

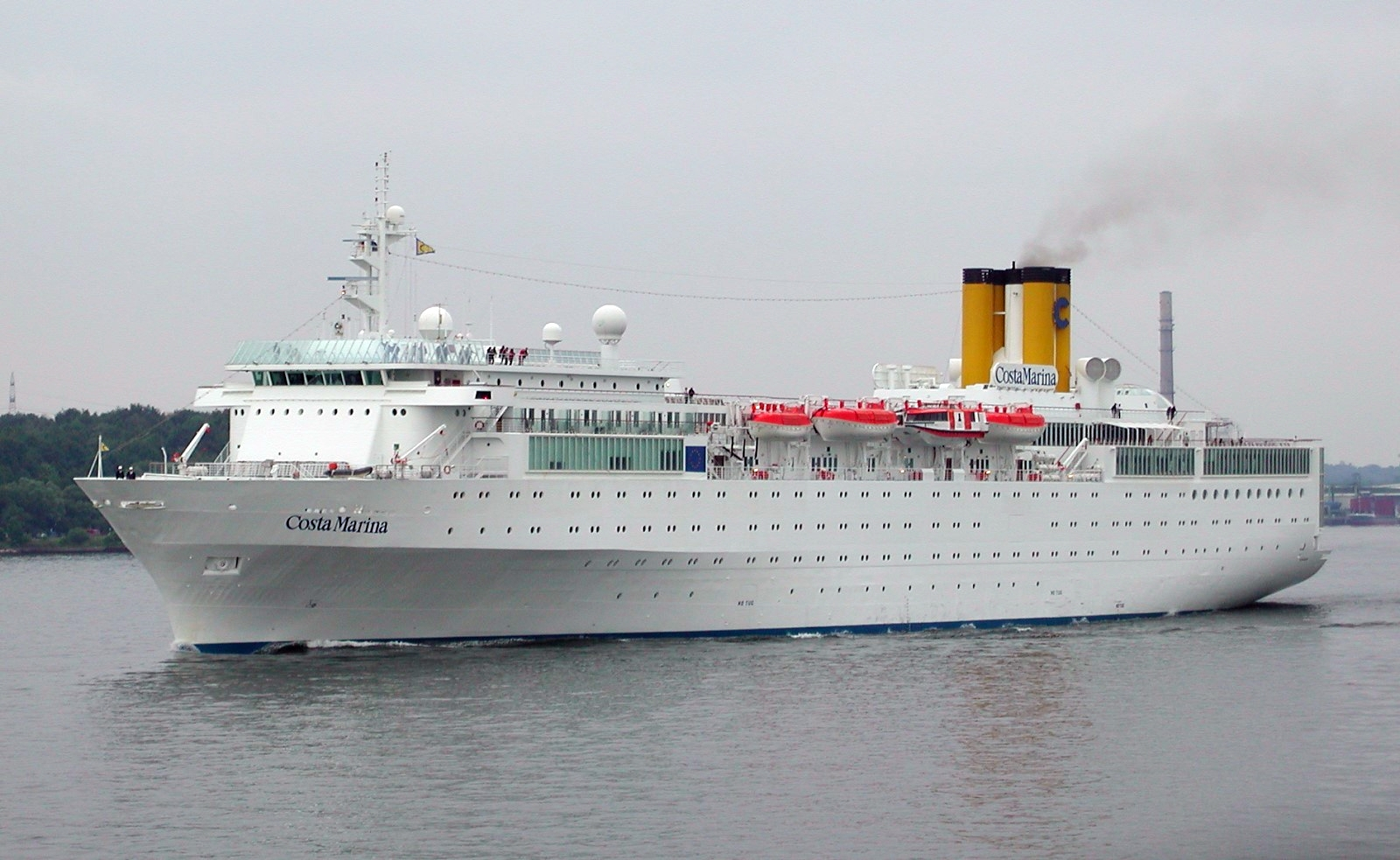
Costa Marina

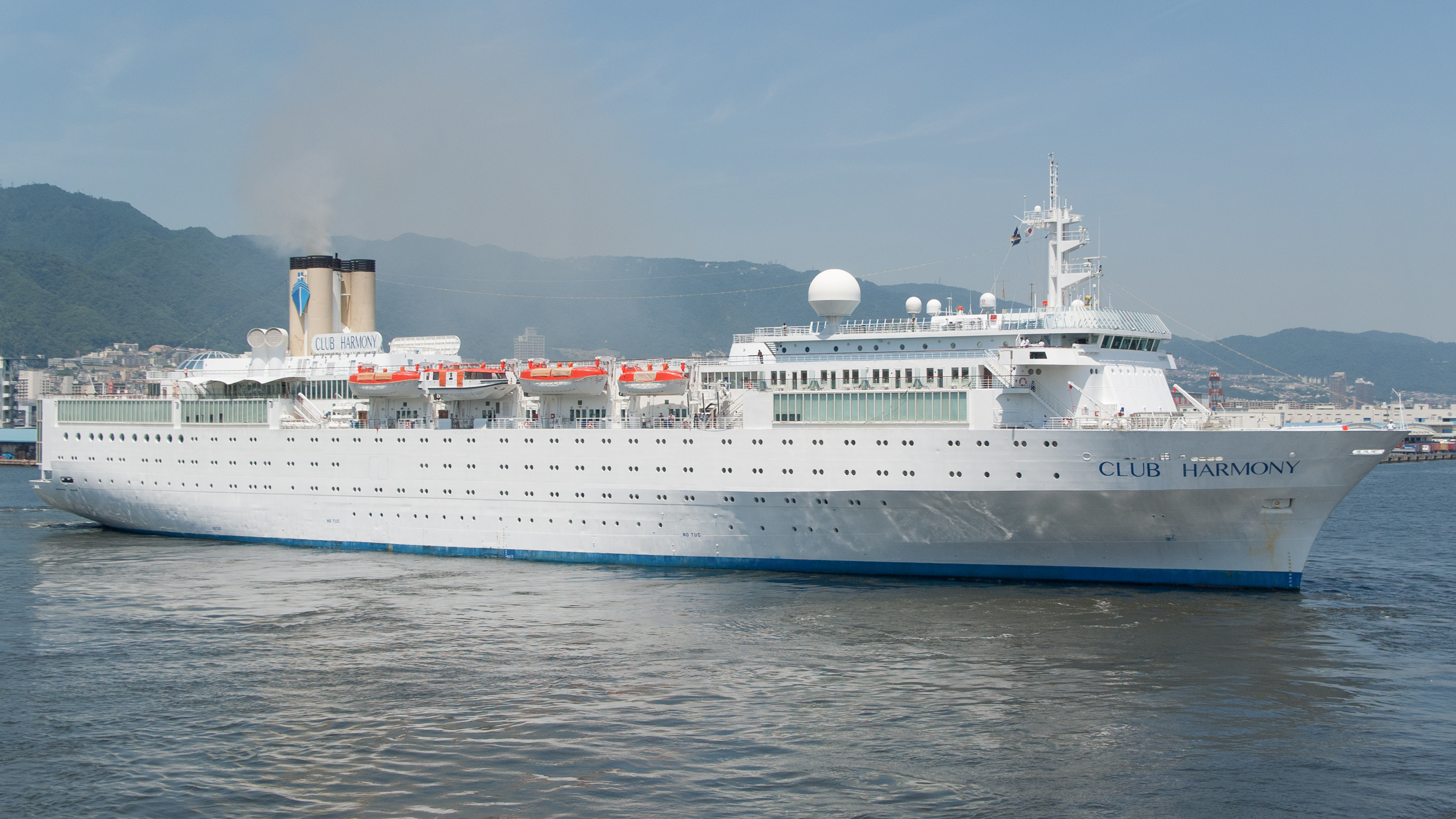
Club Harmony leaving the Port of Kobe in 2012

On August 3, 2011, it was announced by parent company Carnival that new ships would be built for Costa to replace their older ships, starting with Costa Marina. Costa Marina left the fleet in November 2011, and was initially replaced by Iberocruceros' Grand Voyager for her Red Sea cruises. Costa Marina was chartered to the South Korean Harmony Cruise and renamed Harmony Princess with a Marshall Islands registry, for cruises between Korea and Japan. In 2012, her owners renamed her Club Harmony, but she was laid up in January 2013. In September 2014, she was sold for scrap in India and arrived at Alang the following month as Harmony 1.
