= SS Statendam (1956) =

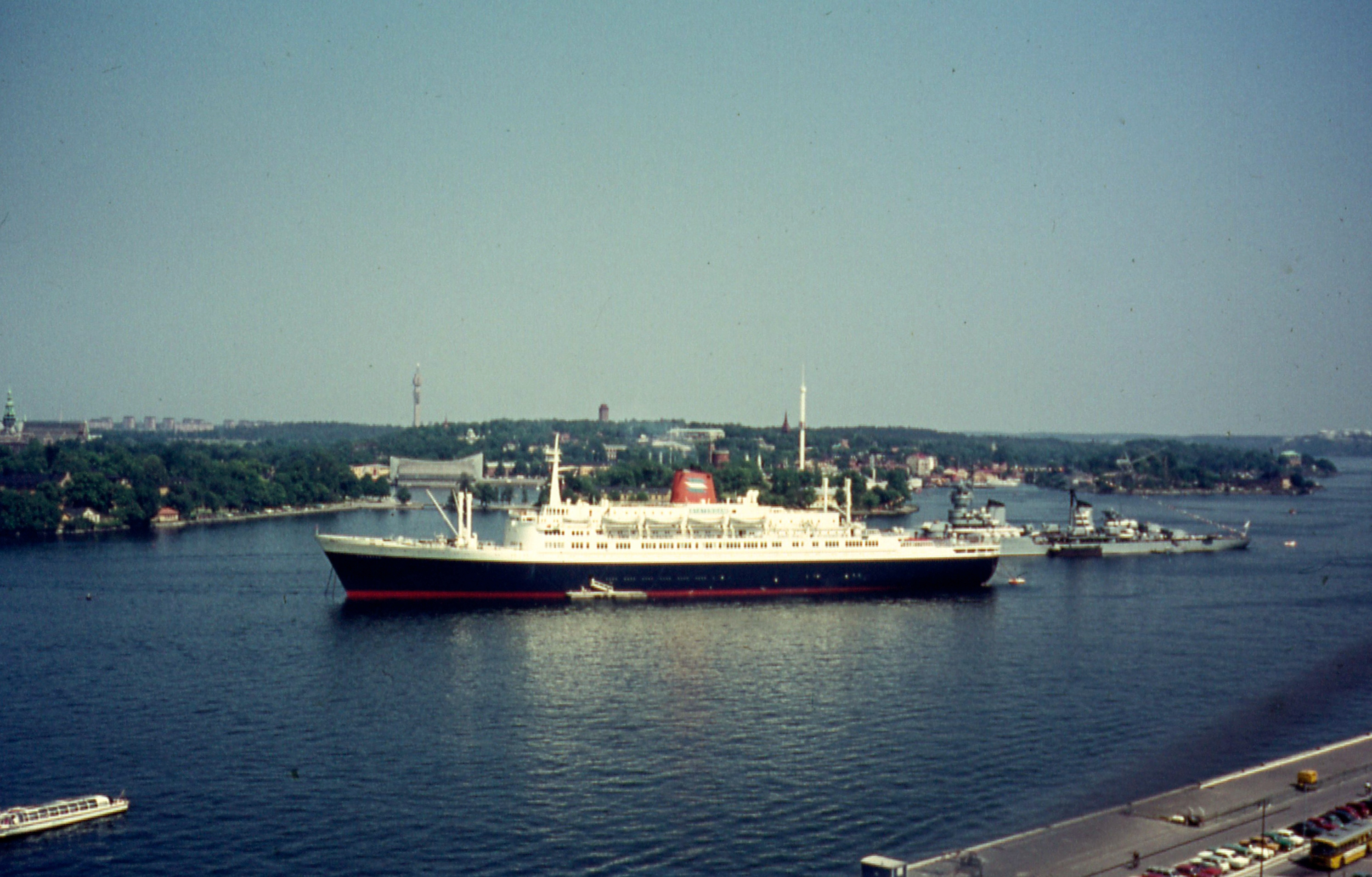

History
- Name: SS Statendam (1956-1982); Rhapsody (1982-1986); Regent Star (1986-1996); Sea Harmony (1996-2004); Harmony I (2004)
- Owner: Holland America Line (1957-1982); Paquet (1982-1986); Regency Cruises (1986-1995); Perosea Shipping Co (1996-2004)
- Port of registry: the Netherlands1957-1982
- Builder: N.V. Dok- en Werfmaatschappij Wilton-Fijenoord, Schiedam
- Yard number: 753
- Launched: 12 June 1956
- In service: 1957-1995
- Out of service: 1995
- Identification: IMO number: 5339212
- Fate: Scrapped in Alang, India in 2004
- Notes: Steam turbines were replaced by diesels in 1987

General characteristics
- Tonnage: 24,294 gross tons
- Length: 642 ft (195.7 m)
- Beam: 81 ft (24.7 m)
- Speed: 16.5 knots (30.6 km/h; 19.0 mph)
- Capacity: 881 passengers

SS Statendam was an ocean liner of the Holland America Line built in 1957. She was bought by the Paquet group in 1982 and renamed Rhapsody and sold again to the Lelakis group in 1986. Later she became part of the Regency Cruises fleet and was named Regent Star in the Regency fleet. She was laid up after the Regency Cruises bankruptcy and remained in poor condition for many years. She was scrapped in Alang, India in 2004.

== Apollo 17 cruise ==
The ship was the venue for a conference on space exploration held to coincide with the December, 1972 launch of Apollo 17. Panelists included science fiction authors, scientists, and others ranging from Isaac Asimov to Norman Mailer to Katherine Anne Porter. The cruise had only 100 paying fares, only 40 of whom paid the additional conference fee, and Holland-America Line lost an estimated $250,000 on the venture. G. Harry Stine characterizes it as the "Ship of Fools" expedition (presumably influenced by the Porter novel). A key organizer of the expedition was Richard C. Hoagland, while the symposium moderator was Hugh Downs; both would later play roles in the "pro-space movement", which space historian Michael Michaud believes found a nascent constituency at the conference.
