= CS Salamis Glory =

Cruise ship built in 1962

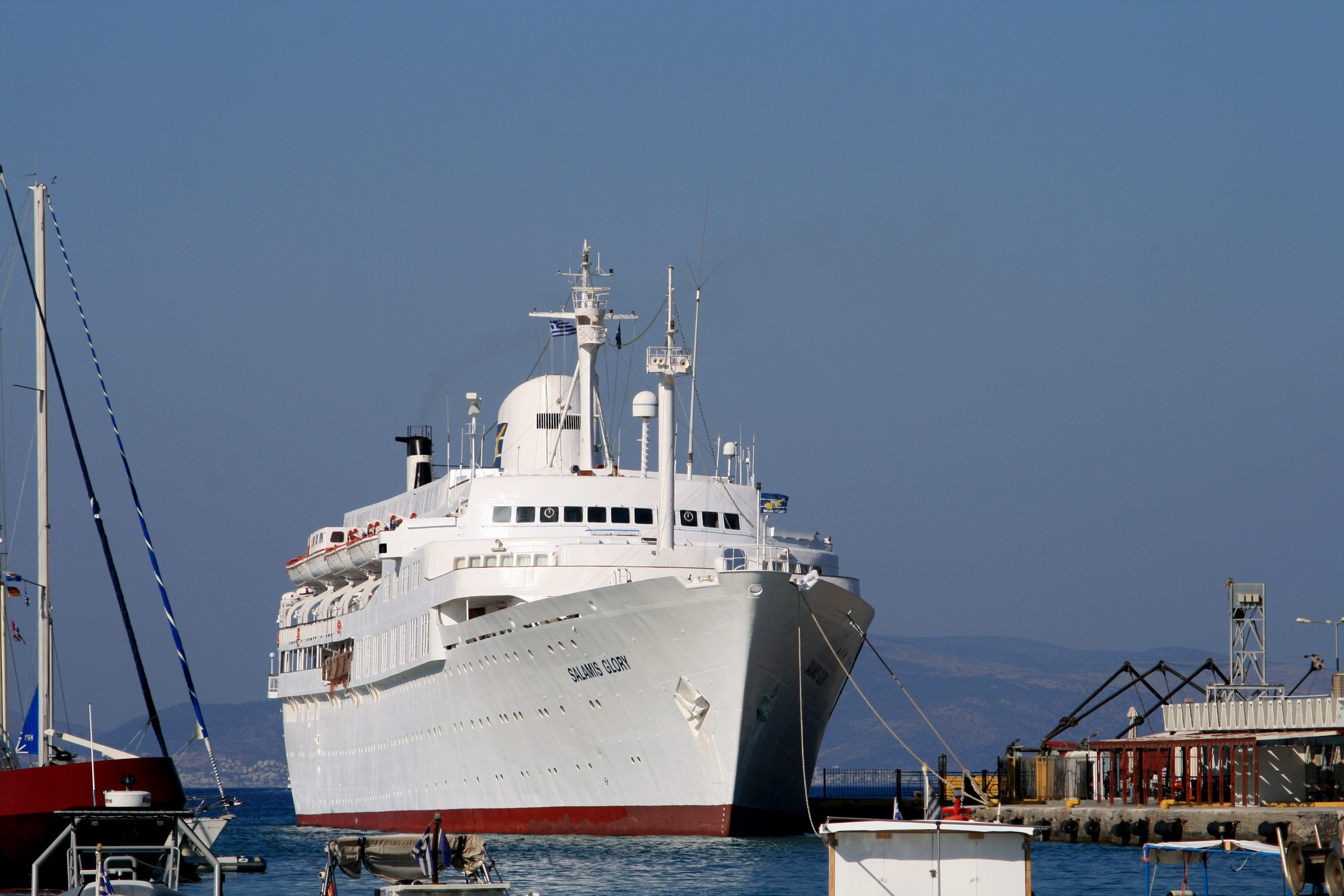
- Cruise ship Salamis Glory

History
- Name: Anna Nery (1962–1978); Danaos (1978); Constellation (1978–1992); Morning Star (1992); Regent Spirit (1992–1996); Salamis Glory (1996–2009); Glory (2009)
- Owner: Cia Nacional de Nav Costeira Autarquia Federal (1962–1967); Cia de Nav Lloyd Brasileiro (1967–1978); Kavolines Corp SA (1978–1988); Hellenic Industrial Development Bank SA (1988–1992); Ridgeway Sg SA (1992–1996); Messadria Sg Co Ltd (1996–2009)
- Port of registry: 1962–1978: Rio de Janeiro, Brazil; 1978–1992: Piraeus, Greece; 1992–1996: Nassau, Bahamas; 1996–2009: Limassol, Cyprus; 2009–2010: Basseterre, Saint Kitts and Nevis
- Builder: Uljanik, Pula
- Launched: 5 November 1961
- Completed: September 1962
- In service: 1962
- Out of service: 2009
- Identification: IMO number: 5018698; Call sign: V4RQ; MMSI number: 341895000
- Fate: Broken up 2009

General characteristics as built
- Type: Cruise ship
- Tonnage: 10,444 GRT; 3,430 DWT
- Length: 150.0 m (492 ft 2 in) oa; 135.0 m (442 ft 11 in) pp
- Beam: 20.0 m (65 ft 7 in)
- Propulsion: 2 diesel engines
- Speed: 17.5 knots (32.4 km/h; 20.1 mph)

CS Salamis Glory (formerly Anna Nery, Danaos, Constellation, Morning Star, Regent Spirit) was a cruise ship registered in Limassol, Cyprus. She cruised the Eastern Mediterranean Sea visiting countries such as Syria, Lebanon, Israel, Greece and Egypt out of Limassol. Entering service in 1962 for a Brazilian shipping company as Anna Nery, the cruise ship was involved in two collisions off Haifa, Israel during its career, one in 1963, 25 km off of Rio de Janeiro with a tanker, and again in 2007. The vessel was sold for scrap in 2009 and broken up.

== Description ==
As built, the ship measured 150.0 m (492 ft 2 in) long overall and 135.0 m (442 ft 11 in) between perpendiculars with a beam of 20.0 m (65 ft 7 in). The cruise ship was powered by two diesel engines and had a maximum speed of 17.5 knots (32.4 km/h; 20.1 mph). The ship had a tonnage of 10,444 gross register tons (GRT) and 3,430 tons deadweight (DWT). The ship had capacity for 420 passengers in first and second class.

The ship was refitted in 2000 and had 222 cabins and eight passenger decks. The ship had a capacity of 600 passengers. The dimensions of the ship were 150.9 metres (495 ft 0 in) long overall, 18.0 metres (59 ft 0 in) wide and a gross tonnage of 10,392 tons. The vessel had a cruising speed of 16 knots (30 km/h; 18 mph).

== History ==
This ship was built in 1961 by Uljanik at their yard in Pula, Yugoslavia with the yard number 237. Constructed for Companhia de Navegação Costeira, and originally called Anna Nery, the vessel was launched on 5 November 1961 and completed in September 1962. The vessel was registered in Rio de Janeiro, Brazil and delivered to Santos in October. Not long after entering service, the ship suffered a boiler explosion. Anna Nery was further damaged in a collision with the tanker Presidente Deodoro in October 1963 off Haifa, Israel. Anna Nery was out of service for nearly a year following the collision. Between 1965 and 1968 the ship was used on the route between Rio de Janeiro and Santos. After that Anna Nery was used on coastal services, transatlantic services and as a cruise ship during the summer months. In 1967, ownership of the vessel was transferred to Lloyd Brasileiro.

Decline in the passenger liner business caused Anna Nery to be taken out of service in 1978 until its sale to Kavolines Corp SA and was operated by the Greek Mediterranean cruise company Hellenic Cruises beginning that year. The vessel was re-registered to Piraeus, Greece and during refits and modifications, Anna Nery was briefly renamed Danaos (1978) and then Constellation (1978). In 1983, the ship was sailing between Piraeus and Durban, South Africa. Refit extensively, the ship later sailed between St. Petersburg, Florida and Mexico and St. Petersburg and Alaska. In 1987 the cruise company operating the ship went bankrupt and Constellation went out of service for four years. The ship was taken over by the Hellenic Industrial Development Bank SA in 1988.

In 1992, the ship was again purchased by another Greek owner and again renamed, this time to Morning Star. It was put into cruise service in the Pacific. It was eventually renamed Regency Spirit, registered in Nassau, Bahamas and passed to the American company Regency Cruises where it served on the Mexican coast during the winter and the Mediterranean during the summer. In 1995, Regency Cruises filed for bankruptcy protection, and Regency Spirit was seized in Nice. The ship was auctioned off to the Cypriot Salamis Cruises in 1996, and renamed Salamis Glory.

On 30 August 2007, Salamis Glory was involved in a collision with the small cargo ship Shelly near the Israeli port of Haifa. As a result of the accident, the cargo ship sunk immediately and two crewmen died.

On 7 December 2009 it became known that Salamis Glory was sold on 24 November for €530,000 and headed to Alang, India, for scrapping. The vessel's name was shorted to Glory for the trip and arrived at Alang on 22 December 2009. The ship was scrapped in Alang in 2010.
