= COVID-19 pandemic on cruise ships =

Early in 2020, in the early days of the COVID-19 pandemic, the disease spread to a number of cruise ships, with the nature of such ships – including crowded semi-enclosed areas, increased exposure to new environments, and limited medical resources – contributing to the heightened risk and rapid spread of the disease.

The British-registered Diamond Princess was the first cruise ship to have a major outbreak on board, with the ship quarantined at Yokohama from 4 February 2020 for about a month. Of 3711 passengers and crew, around 700 people became infected and 9 people died. With that, many cruise lines suspended their operations to mitigate the spread of the pandemic and were replaced by "cruises to nowhere" that had no stops.

By June 2020, over 40 cruise ships had confirmed positive cases of COVID-19 on board. The last cruise ship with passengers aboard during the first wave of the pandemic, Artania, docked at its home port with its last eight passengers on 8 June 2020. (Note: Arcadia had previously docked in Australia, but was required by the Australian government to undock.) In addition, over 40,000 crew members still remained on cruise ships, some in isolation, in mid-June 2020. Many could not be repatriated because cruise lines refused to cover the cost, and because countries had different and changing rules. The condition was stressful to many of those stranded; multiple suicides were reported.

Domestic UK cruises, confined to ports of call in the British Isles, began to resume in May 2021. United States cruises restarted in June 2021.

== Summary of confirmed cases on board ==
Note: The section symbol ('§') left of the ship name in the table below links to the appropriate section on this page, if it exists.

Cruise ship incidents with confirmed positive cases on board
§	Ship	Pass.	Crew	People	Tests	Cases	Dead	Date (Note: Either the date when the ship docked or, if the ship was not allowed to dock, the date passengers or crew were transferred on or off the ship) (Note: In 2020 unless otherwise noted)	Location (Note: Current location in italics if ship has neither docked nor transferred passengers or crew)		Owner/operator
§	Ship	Pass.	Crew	People	Tests	Cases	Dead	Date	Dock	Country	Owner/operator
§	World Dream	1871	1820	3691		7+5	0	5 February 2020	Kai Tak Cruise Tml. (Note: Hong Kong)	China	Dream Cruises (Note: Part of Genting Hong Kong)
§	Diamond Princess (details)	2666	1045	3711	3618	712	14 (Note: Including one deceased passenger who was evacuated from the ship by the Australian Government chartered flight.)	4 February 2020	Port of Yokohama (Note: Yokohama)	Japan	Princess Cruises (Note: A subsidiary of Carnival Corporation)
§	Westerdam	781	747	1528		1	0	13 February 2020	Sihanoukville	Cambodia	Holland America
§	Grand Princess (details)	2422	1111	3533	1103	122 (Note: This includes 103 passengers and 19 crew members. It is unclear if the 2 passengers listed in the second source have been included in the first source. In addition, this value does not include those who disembarked before the ship was rerouted.)	7 (Note: See chart.)	9 March 2020	Port of Oakland (Note: Oakland, California)	USA	Princess Cruises
§	A Sara (Note: Nile River cruise ship, also referred to as River Anuket, Asara, A. Sara, or A'sara)	101	70	171		45		7 March 2020	Luxor	Egypt	Extension Group
§	Costa Magica	2309	945±15 (Note: 960 or 930)			2			near Miami (Note: Denied entry to Port of Miami)	USA	Costa Cruises
§	Braemar	682	38	1063		5		17 March 2020	Port of Mariel (Note: Mariel)	Cuba	FOCL (Note: Fred. Olsen Cruise Lines)
§	Costa Luminosa	1370	410	1780		36	3	19 March 2020	Marseille-Fos Port (Note: Marseille)	France	Costa Cruises
	Carnival Valor					1		15 March 2020	Gulfport (Note: Mississippi)	USA	
§	Silver Explorer	111	120	231				14 March 2020	Castro (Note: Chiloé Island, Los Lagos)	Chile	Silversea Cruises (Note: Part of Royal Caribbean)
§	Silver Shadow	318	291	609		2	1	12 March 2020	Recife Port (Note: Recife)	Brazil	Silversea Cruises
§	Norwegian Bliss					1 (Note: Others have shown symptoms but it is unclear if they have been tested.)					NCL (Note: Norwegian Cruise Line)
§	Norwegian Breakaway					3	1	14 March 2020	Port Canaveral (Note: Florida)	USA	NCL
§	Celebrity Solstice					20 (Note: 1 from Auckland, New Zealand; 1 from Tasmania, Australia; 1 from Perth, Western Australia, Australia; 17 from New South Wales, Australia)	1	none (Note: Ship was already docked.)	Sydney Harbour (Note: Sydney)	Australia	Celebrity Cruises
§	Ruby Princess	~2700	1100			≥852 (Note: Ruby Princess case and death statistics do not cover 900 passengers who left the ship and immediately left Australia.) (Note: This includes 662 passengers and more than 190 crew members.)	28	19 March 2020	Sydney Harbour	Australia	Princess Cruises
§	MSC Bellissima					6 (Note: 1 crew member from Telangana, India; 3 passengers from Azores, Portugal; 1 crew member from Trappeto, Sicily, Italy; 1 crew member from Klagenfurt, Austria)					
§	Ovation of the Seas (Note: Included under ships with confirmed cases on board because it was reported that authorities unusually did not carry out any health checks or tests upon disembarkation.)	~3000				79	1	18 March 2020	Sydney Harbour	Australia	Royal Caribbean
§	Voyager of the Seas (Note: Included under ships with confirmed cases on board because, being owned by Royal Caribbean which also owned Ovation of the Seas and having disembarkation held on the same day as Ovation of the Seas, it is likely that authorities also unusually did not carry out any health checks or tests upon disembarkation, as was reported regarding the disembarkation of Ovation of the Seas.)					39	2 (Note: 2020.03.25: A 68-year-old man from Toowoomba, Australia; 2020.04.13: A 79-year-old man from Kāpiti, New Zealand)	18 March 2020	Sydney Harbour	Australia	Royal Caribbean
§	Costa Victoria	726					1	25 March 2020	Civitavecchia (Note: Rome)	Italy	Costa Cruises
	Marella Explorer 2						1	none	Bridgetown	Barbados	Marella Cruises
	Marella Explorer 2						1	30 March	near Progreso (Note: Ship did not actually dock, but remained 10 kilometres offshore while an elderly critically ill British passenger was transferred via Navy boat. No other passengers were allowed to disembark.)	Mexico	Marella Cruises
§	Artania	800	500	1300		89 (Note: On 2020.04.19, it was reported that 81 passengers and crew members had tested positive. On 2020.04.24, 8 additional crew members that had left the ship in Indonesian waters had tested positive in Jakarta.)	4	27 March	Fremantle Harbour (Note: Western Australia) (Note: Required to leave by Australian government, undocked from Fremantle on 2020.04.18.)	Australia	Phoenix Reisen (Note: Technically owned by MS Artania Shipping.)
§	Artania	8	403 (Note: One source reported that 411 people were aboard, and another reported that there were 8 passengers.)	411		89	4	24 April	near Jakarta	Indonesia	Phoenix Reisen
	Carnival Freedom	0				1		none	Gulfport	USA	
§	Celebrity Apex	0	1407	1407	1444 (Note: This number is larger than the number of crew reported to be on the ship at the time the first coronavirus cases were reported, presumably because other people that may have had contact with the ship, such as independent contractors, were also tested.)	224 (Note: Some sources state that approximately 350 persons had tested positive, but they all seem to have based that number on a lawsuit brought against Celebrity Cruises, where the complaint, filed on 14 April 2020, alleged that on 6 April, [a]pproximately three hundred and fifty (350) crewmembers working aboard the Celebrity Apex test[ed] positive for COVID-19. Eight crewmembers who tested positive were admitted to a local French hospital; four such crewmembers who displayed symptoms return[ed] to the ship a few days later, the other four remain[ed] in the French hospital. This estimate of roughly 350 crew members testing positive by 6 April 2020 appears much larger than the 217 positive cases that the Regional Health Agency reportedly reported the following day, so it is assumed to be a very rough estimate.)		none	C. de l'Atlantique (Note: Chantiers de l'Atlantique)	France	C. de l'Atlantique (Note: Cases aboard the ship were reported before Celebrity Cruises took delivery of the ship.)
	Celebrity Infinity					2	(Note: A crew member died after being medically evacuated by the United States Coast Guard (USCG). Although Celebrity Cruises did not confirm if the death was due to coronavirus, the USCG confirmed that the decedent "had coronavirus-like symptoms".)	none (Note: Ship was already anchored off the coast.)	near Tampa	USA	
§	Costa Favolosa		1009			13	1		near Miami	USA	Costa Cruises
§	MSC Splendida					1					
§	Sun Princess					1 (Note: Technically, the Department of Health's announcement on 26 March stated that "four [people who tested positive] are passengers from cruise ships including the Ruby Princess, Sun Princess and Voyager of the Seas", so there may have been two passengers from Sun Princess who tested positive by this date.)					
§	Zaandam	1243	586	1829		11	4	2/3 April 2020	Port Everglades (Note: Florida)	USA	Holland America
§	Horizon		~250		all	~125 (Note: One report stated about half or more than half of the crew tested positive, while another stated over 150 tested positive.)		none (Note: Docked at time of first known report of first positive case.)	Port Rashid	UAE	Pullmantur Cruises
§	Oasis of the Seas	0				14	3 (Note: 2020.04.18: Dexter Joyosa, 43, from the Philippines, bartender (crew), in Broward County, Florida; 2020.04.20: Iputu Sugiartha, 41, from Indonesia, waiter (crew), in Fort Lauderdale, Florida; 2020.05.03: Carlos Baluran, incinerator room employee (crew), in Broward County, Florida)	none	PortMiami	USA	Royal Caribbean
§	Liberty of the Seas		~1250			2		none	Port of Galveston	USA	
	Majesty of the Seas					≥1 (Note: The CDC reported, as early as 2020.03.30, that at least one person who tested positive was symptomatic while on board.)					
	Riviera					≥1					
§	Coral Princess	1020	878	1898		12	3	4 April	PortMiami	USA	Princess Cruises
§	Disney Wonder					~200 (Note: Reportedly, 38 crew tested positive when the ship was docked after all the passengers had disembarked, and multiple passengers tested positive after a disembarkation process that unusually did not include any health checks or tests. The crew was tested again in the middle of May, with about 200 crew members testing positive. It is unclear how many of the original 38 crew members who had tested positive ended up testing positive again.)		none	Port of San Diego	USA	Disney Cruise Line
§	Greg Mortimer			217	all	128	1	10 April 2020	Montevideo	Uruguay	Aurora Expeditions
§	Pride of America	0	~500	~500		7		none (Note: Ship was already docked at home port.)	Honolulu Harbor (Note: Hawaii)	USA	NCL
	Symphony of the Seas	0				31	1	15 March 2020	PortMiami	USA	
	Celebrity Eclipse	2500				10 (Note: One source stated that three crew members and one passenger tested positive; another source published the death of a Queensland passenger in Sydney; and a third source published the death of a passenger who disembarked at San Diego, added that the widow had tested positive as well, and provided a video reporting that one family had two parents testing positive (and the child showing symptoms) and two passengers from Ottawa had tested positive too.)	2	30 March 2020	Port of San Diego	USA	Celebrity Cruises
	Black Watch	0				8 (Note: An additional 6 crew members were awaiting results.)			near Rosyth	UK	FOCL
§	Celebrity Flora	0			69	48		none	Baltra Island	Ecuador	
	Costa Fascinosa		764			43	3 (Note: Paulo Mudanò, 69 or 70, of Genoa, Italy, head shipboard doctor (crew), in Santos, Brazil; Bendie Antonio, 42, of the Philippines, dining room waiter (crew), in Santos, Brazil; Rudy Haryanto, of Indonesia, assistant housekeeping manager (crew), in Santos, Brazil)	none	Santos	Brazil	
§	Monarch					≥1	1				
§	Costa Atlantica	0	623	623	~50% (Note: Samples from all 623 crew members have been collected.)	148		none	Nagasaki (Note: specifically, at the Koyagi Factory in the Mitsubishi Heavy Industries Nagasaki Shipyard)	Japan	
	MSC Armonia					≥1 (Note: The CDC reported, as early as 2020.04.22, that at least one person who tested positive was symptomatic while on board.)					
§	MSC Seaview	0	615	615		86			near Port of Santos (Note: It is currently under quarantine, and appears to not actually be docked at the port.)	Brazil	
§	Mein Schiff 3	0 (Note: According to TUI Cruises, the last guests disembarked on 2020.03.15. (Note: The exact words used were "die letzten Gäste sind am 15. März von Bord gegangen".))	2899	2899	all	9			Cuxhaven	Germany	TUI Cruises
§	MSC Preziosa					2					MSC Cruises
§	Seven Seas Navigator	0	~450	~450	2	2		21 May 2020	Port of Barcelona	Spain	
§	Adventure of the Seas	0	≥1345 (Note: This consisted of 1044 Jamaican crew members and more than 300 crew members of other nationalities.)	≥1345		19		none	Falmouth	Jamaica	
§	Mein Schiff 1					5 (Note: Two crew members had claimed that seven crew members had tested positive.)		none	near Bremerhaven	Germany	TUI Cruises
§	Roald Amundsen	177	160 (Note: Sources have also reported 158.)	337		36		none (Note: Testing was delayed until ship was docked.)	Tromsø	Norway	Hurtigruten
§	Paul Gauguin	148	192	340		1		2 August 2020	Papeete	France (Note: French Polynesia)	Ponant
§	Norwegian Breakaway	>3200				17		5 December 2021	New Orleans (Note: Louisiana)	USA	NCL

== Ships with confirmed cases on board ==
=== World Dream ===
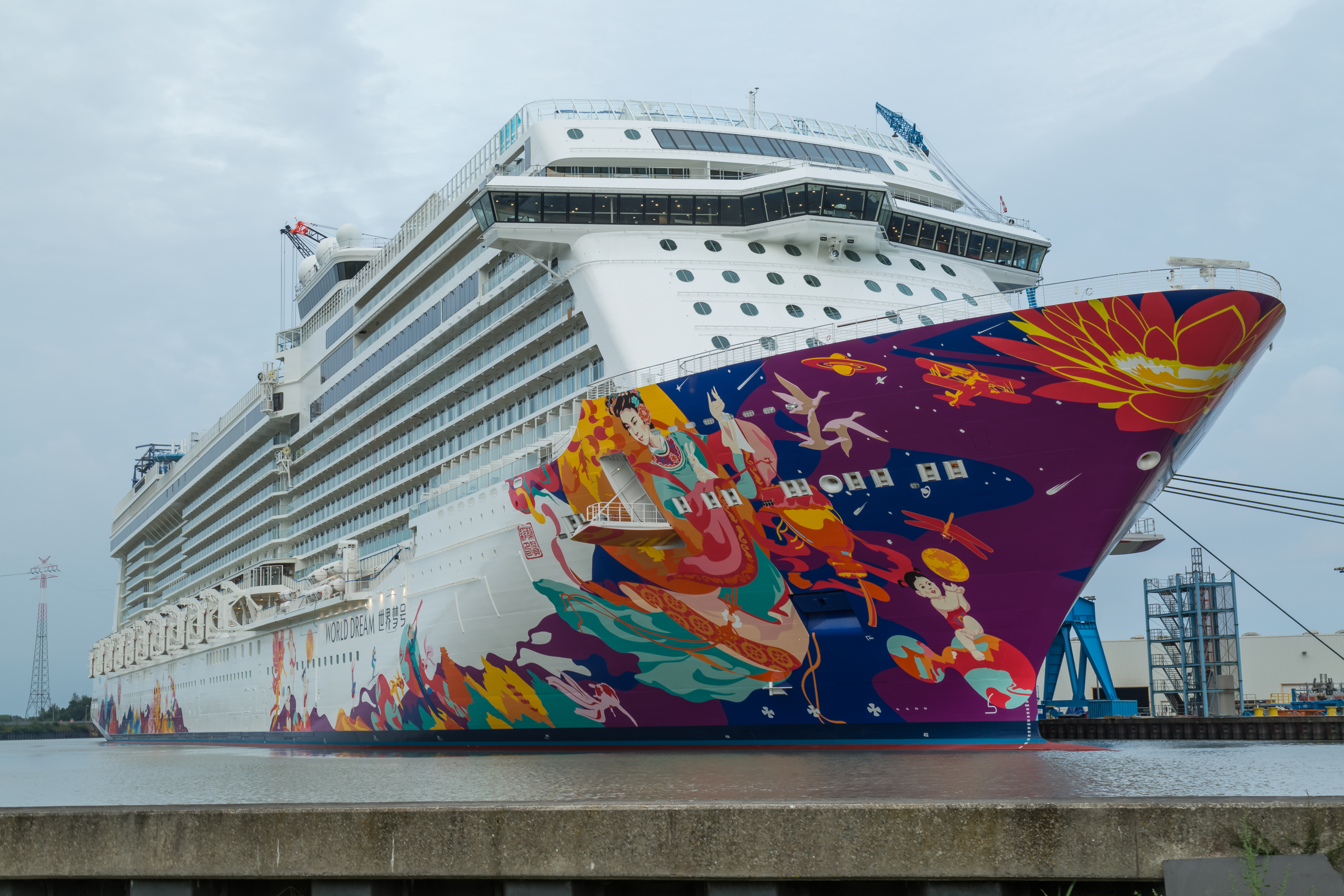
World Dream

The cruise ship World Dream (registered in the Bahamas, operated by Dream Cruises) was on a journey from Nansha Port, Guangzhou, Guangdong, China, to Nha Trang and Da Nang in Vietnam during 19–24 January 2020 with 6,903 persons on board including 108 from Hubei, in which 28 were from Wuhan.

On 24 January 2020, the ship returned to Nansha Port. Port customs performed a temperature check for all disembarking passengers and crew, with 31 people sampled and tested for the virus, including those who had fever during the cruise and those who were in close contact with confirmed cases before they boarded for the cruise. All the test results were negative though some of them were later confirmed to be infected.

Between 24 January 2020 and 2 February 2020, the ship made three additional cruises out of Guangzhou or Hong Kong, including two "cruises to nowhere" and one to the Philippines, although passengers from the journey were not disembarked at Manila due to local resident protests over fear on the virus.

Confirmed cases

On 2 February 2020, the ship departed from Hong Kong for Taiwan with around 3,800 persons on board. On the same night, the cruise company was notified that there were confirmed cases from the ship's former passengers. On the next day, the Guangdong government officially announced that three former passengers from the Vietnam journey had been confirmed infected by the novel coronavirus after they were disembarked. Former passengers from the cruise in China were told to contact local health authority and observer quarantine.

As of 11 February 2020, 12 cases associated with the cruise were confirmed, including 1 ground worker who had temporarily worked on the ship, and 4 relatives of passengers.

Quarantine and preventive actions

After the Guangdong government official announcement of confirmed cases among former passengers, on 4 February 2020, Taiwan blocked the ship's port of call in Kaohsiung due to concern on the virus. On 5 February 2020, World Dream returned to Hong Kong and all 3,800 passengers and crew on board the ship at the time were put under quarantine at Kai Tak Cruise Terminal. The quarantine was lifted on 9 February 2020 after all 1,800 crew members tested negative for the virus. The majority of the passengers were not tested as they had had no contact with the infected Chinese passengers who had been on the ship during 19–24 January.

Evacuation of crew members

After all passengers were disembarked, World Dream cruised to Malaysia. The crew were not allowed to leave the ship in several countries, after one passenger who had disembarked tested positive for COVID-19. The ship finally anchored near Bintan Island, Indonesia. The evacuation of 188 Indonesia crew members from the cruise ship was performed by an Indonesian naval hospital ship and all tested negative for COVID-19. On 28 February 2020 they were quarantined for 14 days on the uninhabited Sebaru Kecil Islet, Thousand Islands, Jakarta.

=== Diamond Princess ===
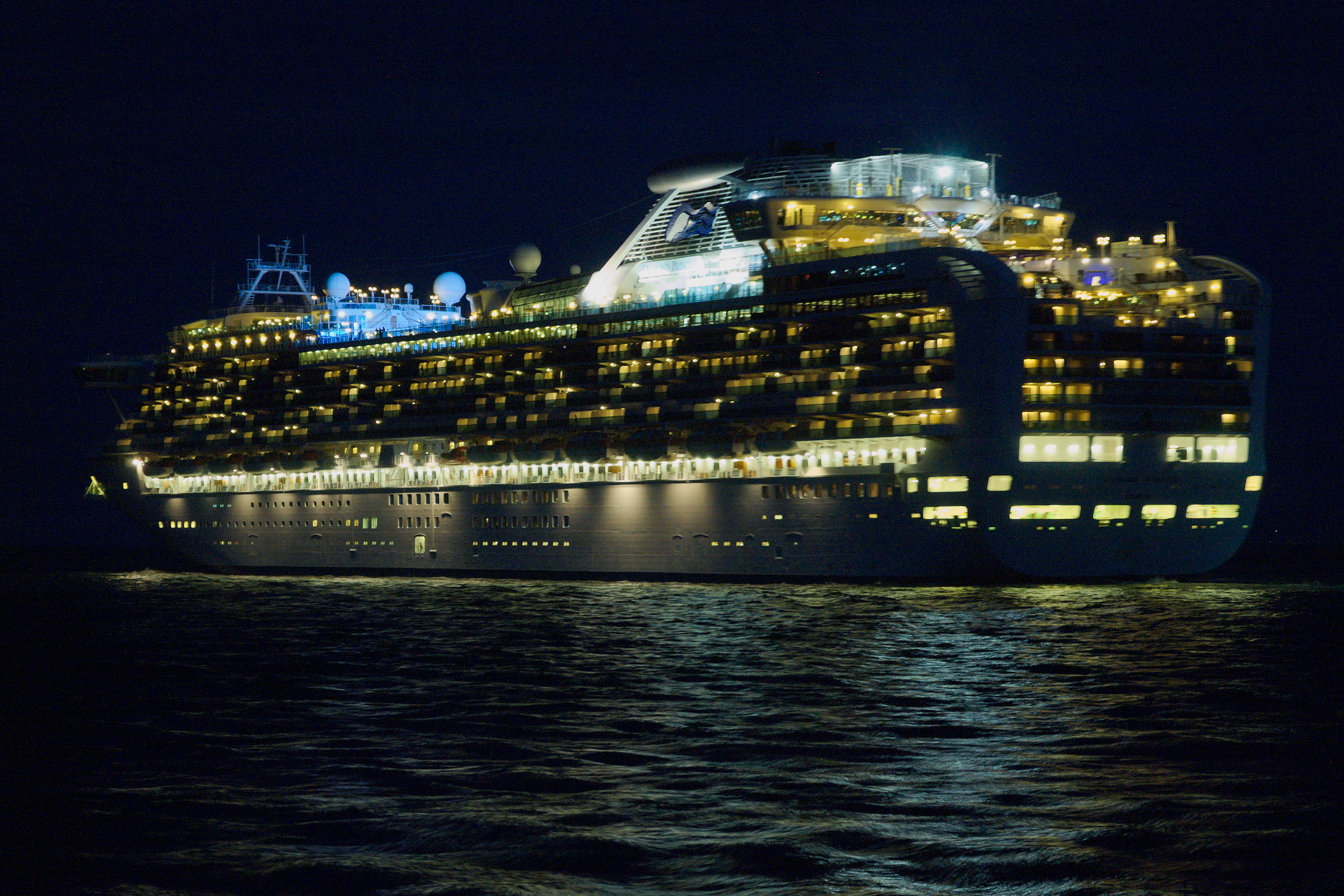
Diamond Princess in 2014

On 4 February 2020, Japan's Ministry of Health, Labour and Welfare announced that Diamond Princess, (Note: A cruise ship registered in Britain owned and operated by Princess Cruises (incorporated in Bermuda and with headquarters in Santa Clarita, California, US), a brand of Carnival Corporation & plc.) which had docked at Yokohama (Note: in Tokyo Bay near Tokyo) the previous day, (Note: Princess Cruises listed this cruise as a 15-night cruise beginning on 20 January 2020, with arrival in Yokohama scheduled on the 16th day, 4 February 2020, but it had arrived at Yokohama a day early.) was quarantined at sea with 10 positive cases on board.

Diamond Princess had originally departed from Yokohama on 20 January 2020 for a roundtrip cruise. (Note: The cruise (numbered M003), billed as a tour of Southeast Asia during the Lunar New Year period, had scheduled stops at Kagoshima (Japan), Hong Kong (China), Chân Mây Port (Note: near Da Nang and Huế) (Vietnam), Hạ Long Bay (Note: a cruise port that serves Hanoi) (Vietnam), Keelung (Note: near Taipei) (Taiwan), and Okinawa (Japan).) On 20 February 2020, the World Health Organization stated that the ship accounted for more than half of the reported infections around the world outside of China.

=== Westerdam ===
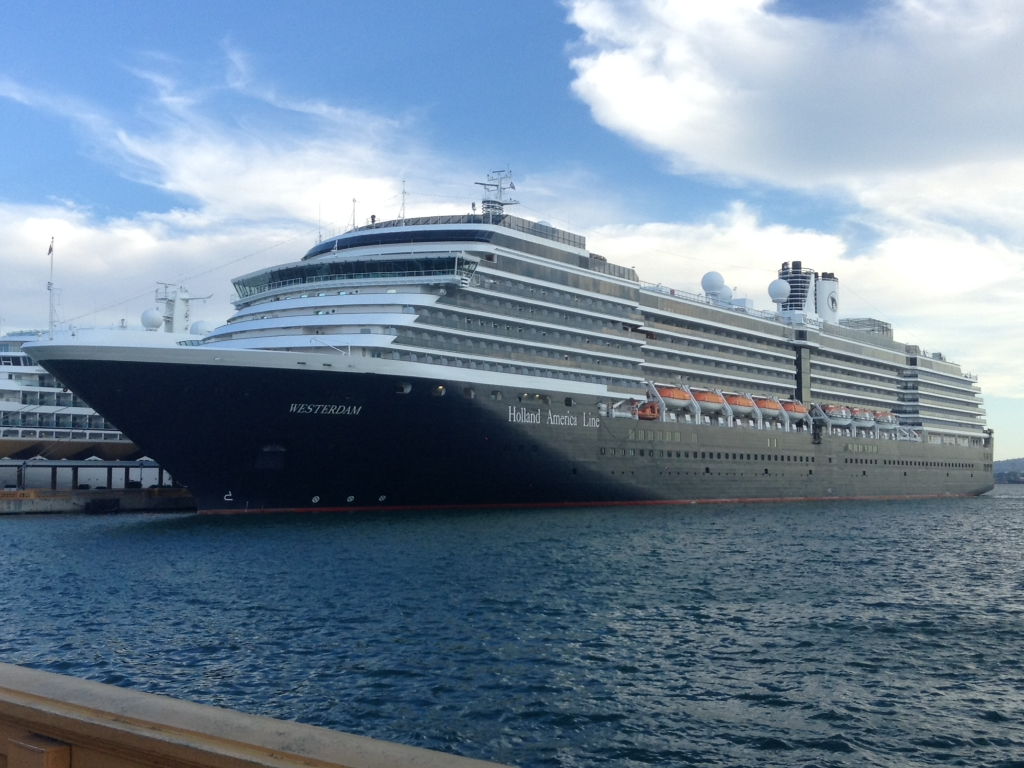
Westerdam on 24 November 2015

In February 2020, the Holland America Line ship MS Westerdam, departing after a stop in Hong Kong on 1 February, was not allowed to call in the Philippines, Japan, and Guam over concerns regarding coronavirus infections. After initially receiving approval on 10 February to let the passengers disembark in Thailand, as the ship was heading to Laem Chabang port near Bangkok, permission to dock was refused the next day. However, the ship was still maintaining its course to Bangkok and at around 10:30 am CET on 11 February, Westerdam sailed around the southern tip of Vietnam. According to Flip Knibbe, a Dutch passenger on the ship, all the passengers had their temperatures checked a second time. Speaking to NOS on 11 February, Knibbe said "Dit schip is virusvrij": 'This ship is virus-free'. Unlike Diamond Princess, those on board were not in quarantine. Everyone could move freely, shops and restaurants were open and the entertainment programme continued.

After Westerdam was refused at several points of call, on 13 February, the ship was allowed to dock in Sihanoukville, Cambodia. At this point, only the 20 passengers who reported feeling ill were tested, and all of them tested negative.

On 15 February, Malaysia reported that an 83-year-old US citizen who disembarked from Westerdam and flew into Malaysia on 14 February had tested positive for SARS-CoV-2. In a second test, requested by both the Holland America Line and Cambodian authorities the woman tested positive again. Despite these findings, Cambodian Prime Minister Hun Sen visited the ship, discouraged use of masks, and encouraged the passengers to tour the city, sparking concerns that another spoke was being added to the contagion network. Westerdam passengers were later denied entry to Thailand, Singapore, Malaysia, Taiwan, and other countries.

On 22 February, after treatment with antiviral medications that were speculated to have an effect against COVID-19, the woman's medical condition improved and she was tested negative for SARS-CoV-2. The United States Centers for Disease Control and Prevention (CDC) initially stated that the woman had never been infected by SARS-CoV-2, but withdrew the claim, clarifying that the CDC "[has] no visibility on whether the initial test of the woman was anything other than positive". Due to possible background politics, it is uncertain whether these results were a false negative, or whether the passenger cleared the virus from her system after 72 hours of intensive treatment.

=== Grand Princess ===
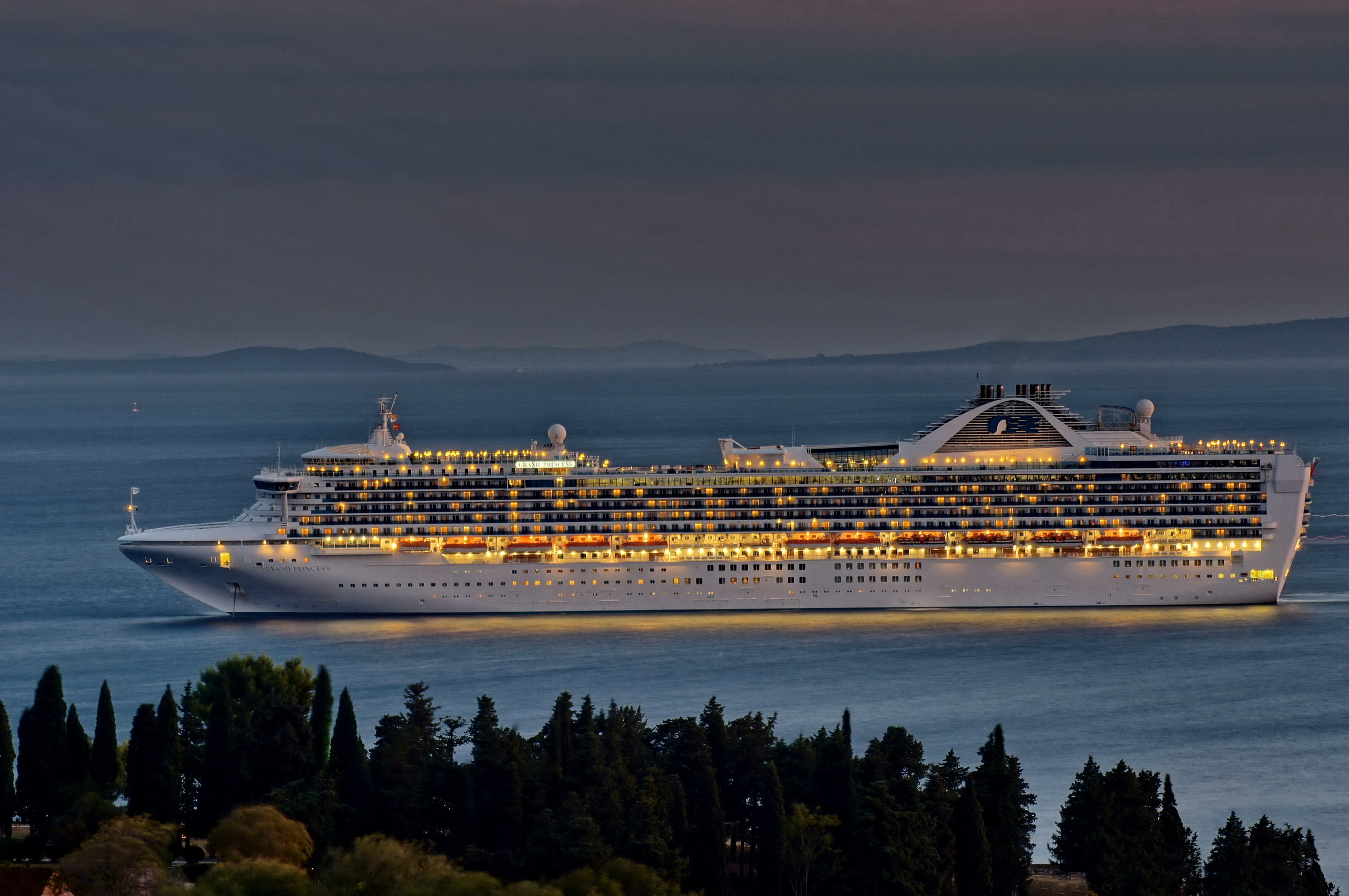
Grand Princess in Split, Croatia, 2011

California National Guard's 129th Rescue Wing airlifting test kits to Grand Princess

Public health officials from Placer County, California, U.S., reported that an elderly resident with underlying health conditions who had died (Note: This marked the first death known at the time in California attributable to the virus. It would be discovered on 2020.04.21 that a 57-year-old woman from San Jose had died on 2020.02.06 from the virus.) on 4 March 2020 had tested positive for SARS-CoV-2 after returning from a Mexican Riviera (Note: The 10-day cruise sailed from San Francisco to Mexico and back, making four stops in Mexico, as noted in the itinerary.) cruise on Grand Princess between 11 and 21 February.

As a result of increasing reports of former passengers of Grand Princess testing positive, Princess Cruises, the owner and operator of Grand Princess, working with the Centers for Disease Control and Prevention (CDC), the government of California, and public health officials in San Francisco, terminated a port call in Ensenada, Mexico, planned for 5 March and ordered the ship to return to San Francisco over concerns about the potential for an outbreak on board. Some passengers (Note: These were the 62 passengers that were also on the previous cruise to Mexico.) were quarantined in their own on-board staterooms on 4 March by order of the CDC. In addition, out of the 3533 people on board the ship (2422 passengers and 1111 crew members), 11 passengers and 10 crew members were exhibiting potential symptoms, and Grand Princess was ordered by the government of California to remain offshore while the California National Guard's 129th Rescue Wing airlifted test kits by helicopter to the ship.

On 6 March, U.S. Vice-President Mike Pence announced that, of the 46 tests conducted, 19 crew members and 2 passengers had tested positive, and added that the ship would be brought to a non-commercial port, with everyone on the ship being tested and quarantined as necessary, while President Trump, ignoring expert advice, wanted those on board Grand Princess to stay on the ship so that they would not be counted as American cases, which would otherwise "double because of one ship that wasn't our fault".

On 9 March, the ship docked at the Port of Oakland and passengers started disembarking. More than 3,000 people on board were to be quarantined, with passengers at land facilities and the crew on board.

By 25 March 2020, the Department of Health and Human Services (HHS) said that, of the 1,103 passengers who elected to be tested, 103 tested positive, 699 tested negative, and the remaining results were pending.

As of 20 April 2020, neither Princess Cruises, nor the CDC, nor the HHS appeared to have made any subsequent test results public. In addition, some passengers complained about waiting for weeks without getting test results back, and some passengers have not been tested at all even though they showed symptoms upon disembarkation, despite Vice-President Pence's earlier claim that all passengers would be tested.

The first known person in California to die of the virus at the time, as well as the first cases in Alberta, Hawaii, and Utah, were all former passengers of Grand Princess.

=== River Anuket ===
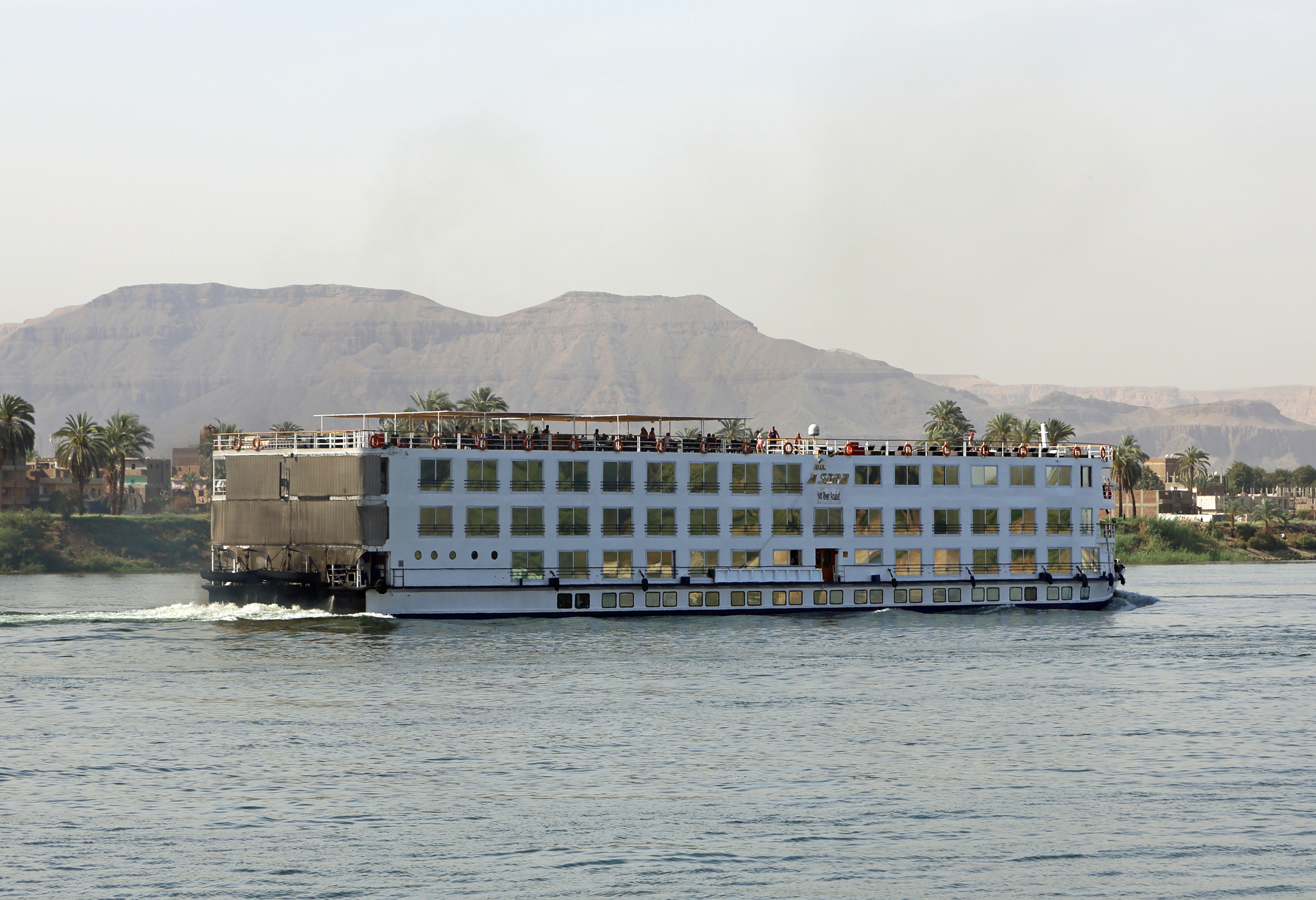
River Anuket in March 2018

A Taiwanese-American tourist, who had been a passenger on a Nile River cruise ship variously known as MS River Anuket or Asara, discovered that she was positive for SARS-CoV-2 after she returned to Taiwan. World Health Organization officials informed Egyptian authorities of the situation, and all crew members and 150 passengers aboard the cruise ship were tested for SARS-CoV-2. On 7 March 2020, health authorities announced that 45 people on board had tested positive despite being asymptomatic, and that the ship had been placed in quarantine at a dock in Luxor.

=== Costa Magica ===
On 12 March, two passengers aboard Costa Magica were reported to be tested positively for COVID-19 while quarantined in Martinique. The ship, which departed from Guadeloupe with 3,300 people on board, had been disallowed entry at several sea ports including Grenada, Tobago, Barbados and Saint Lucia, due to the presence of over 300 Italian nationals on board.

All the passengers were disembarked, and 930 crew members stayed aboard. Eventually, the ship stopped three miles (4.8 km) offshore from Miami, and on 26 March, the U.S. Coast Guard reported evacuation of six sick crew members from Costa Magica.

=== Braemar ===
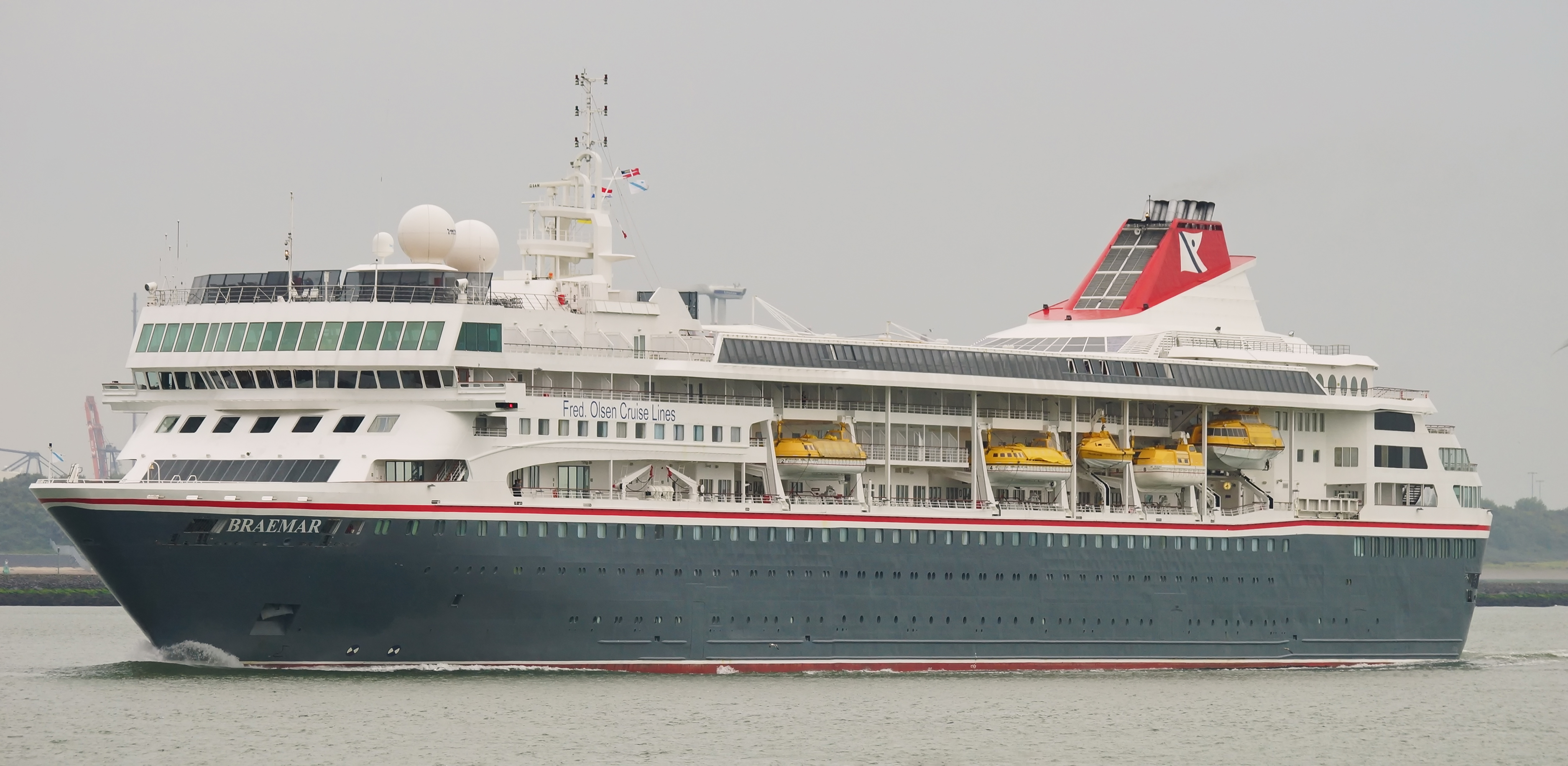
Braemar in Nieuwe Waterweg

On 13 March 2020, five passengers tested positive for the COVID-19 virus aboard MS Braemar. As a result, the ship was denied entry into its destination, the Bahamas. The infected patients were discovered after a former passenger of the cruise tested positive in the Canadian province of Alberta. The infected passenger disembarked off the cruise in Kingston, Jamaica, but it was unknown where they contracted the disease.

Sint Maarten also denied a request from the cruise to allow passengers to fly out. Cuba finally allowed the ship to dock and evacuated all travellers to the United Kingdom on 17 March.

=== Costa Luminosa ===
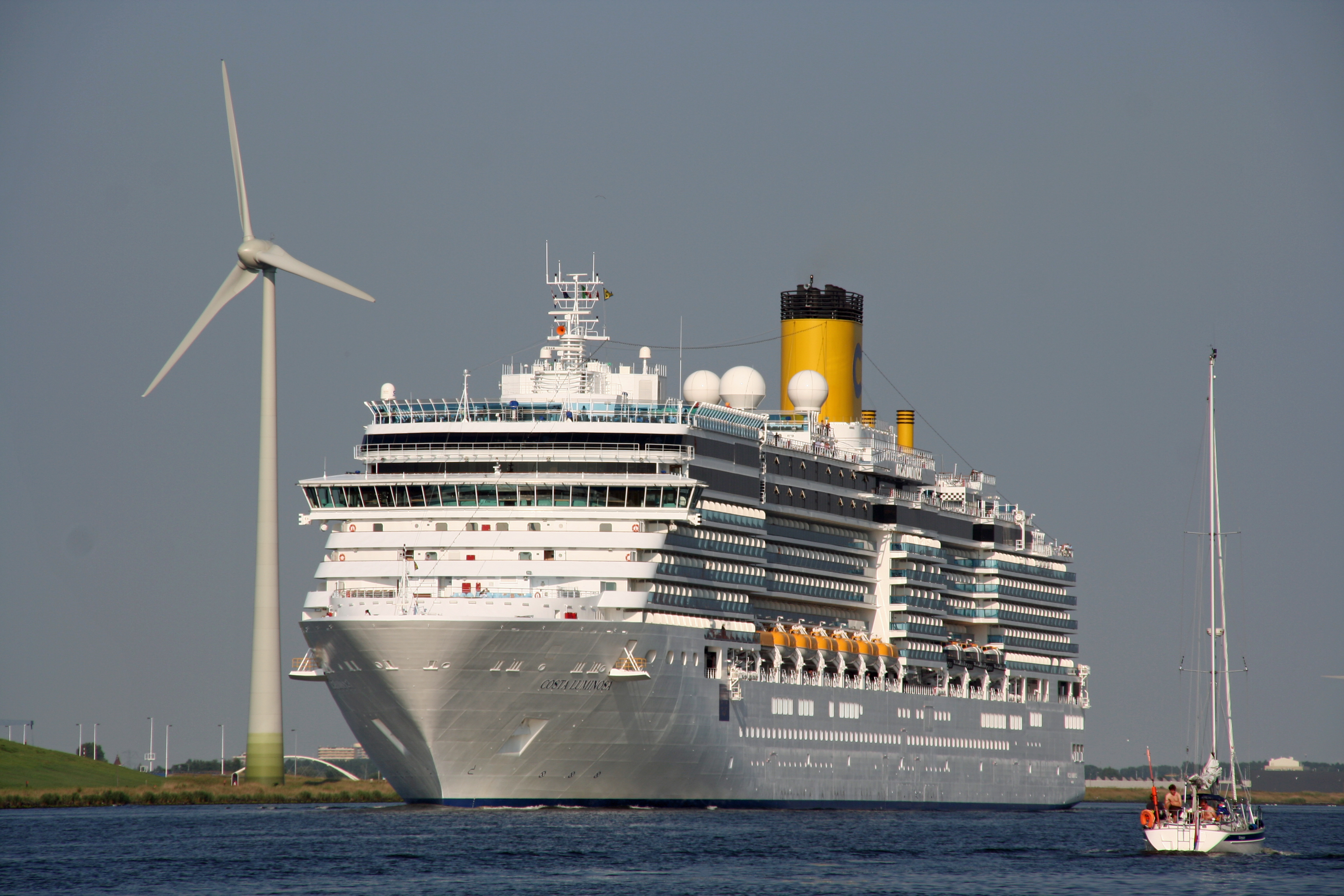
Costa Luminosa in 2010

On 29 February 2020, a 68-year-old Italian man in critical condition was transferred from Costa Luminosa to a hospital in the Cayman Islands due to heart issues. On 12 March, the Health Services Authority of the Cayman Islands announced that the man was their first confirmed coronavirus case. His death was announced two days later.

On 8 March, a 68-year-old Italian woman was quarantined in the U.S. Territory of Puerto Rico while being tested for the virus. She had arrived there via Costa Luminosa, which had departed from Fort Lauderdale, Florida, US. On 13 March she, her husband and a third person's tests came back positive for the virus, the first confirmed cases in Puerto Rico.

On 19 March the ship disembarked more than 350 passengers, from the United States and Canada only, at Marseille, France. Buses and then a chartered plane were used to fly them back to Atlanta, Georgia, U.S., without testing for COVID-19. While in flight, the results from those who were tested in Marseille were positive, so those whose results were positive were sat in separated seats. At Hartsfield-Jackson Atlanta International Airport, the passengers were met by people with hazmat suits to check their body temperatures, perform visual assessment and ask if any had COVID-19 symptoms. Those without symptoms were to go to customs and then take their baggage. Several of the passengers became positive for COVID-19 later and some of them died. On 23 March there were 36 confirmed cases of COVID-19 out of those who disembarked from the ship.

On 21 March local news in Puerto Rico reported the death of the quarantined Italian woman.

=== Silver Explorer ===
Silver Explorer docked in Castro, Chile, with 111 passengers and 120 crew, after an 83-year-old man fell ill and tested positive for the virus.

=== Silver Shadow ===
Silversea Cruises ship Silver Shadow was blocked from disembarking its 608 passengers and crew at the port of Recife in Brazil, as a 78-year-old Canadian aboard had been suspected of having the virus. Two passengers were later medically disembarked, and one of them tested positive for the virus. A Canadian man died of the disease on 26 March. His wife also tested positive for the virus.

=== Norwegian Bliss ===
On 18 March 2020, it was reported that Norwegian Cruise Line had sent a letter to passengers who had booked a cruise (Note: This refers to the cruise that began on 8 March 2020 and ended on 15 March .) on Norwegian Bliss that "a 2-year-old who traveled aboard the vessel on the 1 March 2020 voyage of the Norwegian Bliss tested positive for COVID-19". Although passengers receiving that letter stated that they wanted to reschedule, Norwegian Cruise Line refused to honour their requests. As a result, some people who decided not to embark on the cruise lost thousands of dollars, while others who chose to risk infection by joining the cruise ended up displaying symptoms of the disease while on the cruise.

=== Norwegian Breakaway ===
On 19 March 2020, it was reported that Norwegian Cruise Line had sent a letter on 18 March to passengers of the Norwegian Breakaway cruise that began on 7 March and ended on 14 March that someone who had been on the same cruise had tested positive for coronavirus. After showing symptoms and being placed in the ship's ICU, the guest was taken by ambulance to a hospital at Ocho Rios, Jamaica, during a scheduled stop on 10 March 2020, and was eventually medically evacuated to Broward Hospital in Fort Lauderdale, Florida, U.S., on 13 March, where she tested positive on 15 March. Many other passengers started showing symptoms but had difficulty getting tested.

Passengers were wondering why the company took so long to inform passengers of the initial positive test, as they had started learning about the result through local news sources and social media instead. Passengers complained that, had they been informed earlier of the test, they could have taken precautions to avoid spreading the virus any further. It was also reported that the disembarkation process was "surprisingly routine", with one former passenger stating that there was "[n]o temperature check, no screenings, no questions asked, nothing", and that he "just walked away from the ship, got on a shuttle and left".

On 24 March 2020, the Pittsburgh Post-Gazette reported that two former passengers from Westmoreland County had tested positive. At the time, there were 11 confirmed cases in the county.

On 9 April 2020, the passenger who was airlifted to Florida died in isolation at the hospital, after being on a ventilator for nearly 30 days.

On 5 December 2021, at least ten passengers and crew tested positive for COVID-19. The ship had departed New Orleans on 28 November with all passengers and crew being required to have a COVID-19 vaccine. Some guests reported not being told about the infections until after the ship returned to port on 5 December. One day later on 6 December, the number of infected had risen to eight passengers and nine crew members, and the Norwegian Breakaway departed New Orleans with a new set of passengers.

=== Celebrity Solstice ===
The New Zealand Ministry of Health announced on 20 March 2020 that a man from Auckland in his 60s that was on Celebrity Solstice had tested positive for the virus. He had boarded the ship in Auckland on 10 March and disembarked at Port Chalmers, a suburb of Dunedin, on 15 March. All New Zealanders on board who returned to New Zealand were considered close contacts and put in isolation.

On 23 March 2020, Tasmania's Department of Health reported a positive case who disembarked at Sydney on 20 March. On 26 March, a man from Perth in his 70s who was a passenger of Celebrity Solstice, died of the disease at Joondalup Health Campus. New South Wales' Ministry of Health had reported 11 cases from the ship by 2 April, and 17 cases from the ship as of 9 April.

The ship left Australia during the weekend of 4 April 2020 with its crew as did four other vessels.

=== Ruby Princess ===
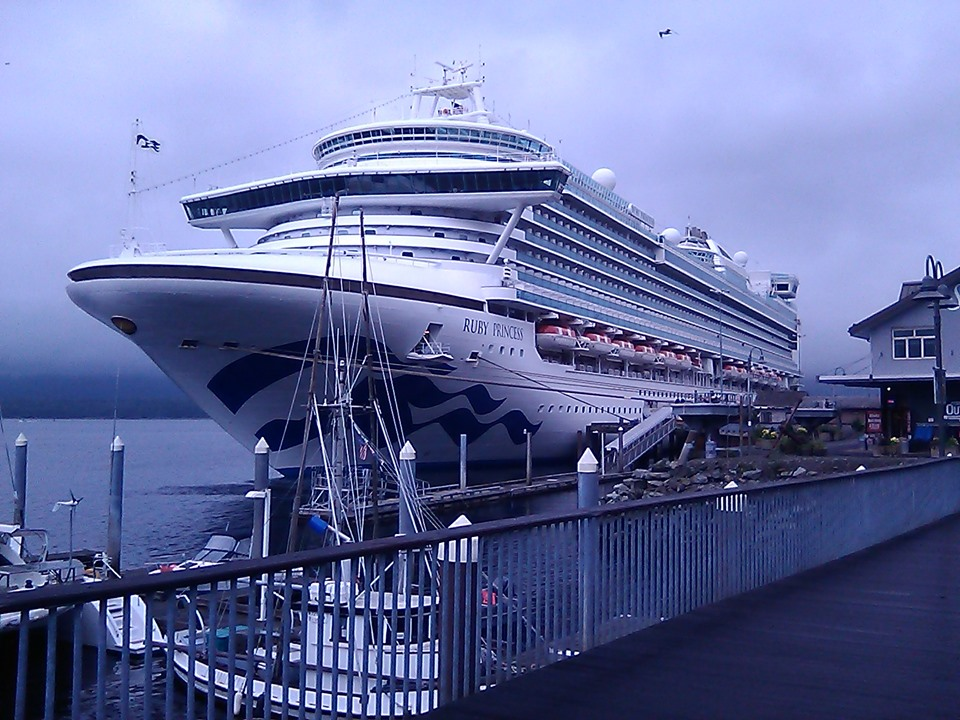
Ruby Princess docked in Ketchikan, Alaska during a 7-day Alaska cruise in August 2019

From 15 March 2020, Australia banned cruise ships arriving from foreign ports. However, exemptions were granted to allow four ships, already en route to Australia, to dock and disembark their passengers. On 19 March 2020, Ruby Princess, which was one of the four ships given the exemption, docked at the Overseas Passenger Terminal in Sydney, after a cruise to New Zealand. The cruise ship was forced to return to Sydney early after some passengers reported respiratory problems, but when disembarking passengers were not told that anyone on board presented any symptoms during the voyage. On 20 March, it was announced that three passengers and a crew member of Ruby Princess had tested positive for the virus. The ship had docked in Sydney Harbour, and the passengers had disembarked before the results came back positive. The ship had returned to Sydney with 1,100 crew members and 2,700 passengers, and 13 people who were sick were tested for the virus.

On 24 March, one person who was a passenger on the 8–19 March cruise aboard Ruby Princess died after a coronavirus diagnosis. As of 30 March, at least 440 passengers (211 in New South Wales, 71 in South Australia, 70 in Queensland, 43 in Western Australia, 22 in the Australian Capital Territory, 18 in Victoria, three in Tasmania and two in the Northern Territory) had tested positive for the virus. As of 31 March 2020, five of them had died, one in the Australian Capital Territory, two in Tasmania, one in New South Wales and one in Queensland. As of 2 April, the number of cases in New South Wales had risen to 337 passengers and 3 crew members, so total passenger cases in Australia had risen to at least 576 cases. As of 4 April the total cases rose to 662 with 7 passengers have died. It is a ninth of the national total of 5,548 confirmed COVID-19 cases, increase from a tenth, five days before. This did not include about 900 passengers who left Australia without being tested. Another three passengers from the ship were reported dead in New South Wales and a fourth in Queensland on 5 April. A man was reported to have died in Western Australian on 6 April. An additional death was announced in Tasmania on 7 April, bringing total deaths to 13. 11 cases of secondary transmission from people infected on the ship had been reported, which had not led to any deaths. By 13 April, the number of deaths among the roughly 1,700 Australians who had been passengers on the ship had reached 18. The death toll reached 22 on 13 May 2020, including two deaths in the United States. According to an inquiry by Bret Walker SC for the New South Wales government, the eventual death toll was at least 28, including eight from the United States.

Australian Border Force is responsible for passport control and customs, while the federal Department of Agriculture is responsible for biosecurity in Australia under the Biosecurity Act 2015; however, it is up to each state's health department to prevent illness in the community. Responsibility for the breakdown in communications will be determined by a later enquiry.

The ship was allowed to dock at Port Kembla on 6 April after having been at sea outside of Sydney since 20 March. As of 8 April, the ship's crew of about 1,000 remained on board, with 200 exhibiting flu-like symptoms; 18 had tested positive for COVID-19. On 11 April, NSW Health announced that from 88 crew who were tested, 44 of them or 50 per cent, tested positive to COVID-19. 542 crew members were taken off the ship for repatriation between 21 and 23 April. 190 members of the crew have tested positive for the virus. The ship left Port Kembla on 23 April. A criminal investigation was begun by New South Wales Police to determine why the ship had been permitted to dock, and passengers to disembark, without quarantine. Investigators from Task Force Bast seized the vessel's "black box" voyage data recorder (similar to a flight recorder).

=== MSC Bellissima ===
On 21 March 2020, officials from the Indian state of Telangana reported that a 33-year-old crew member of MSC Bellissima had tested positive for the virus. The crew member was also reported to have been to Dubai, and was stable at the time of the report.

On 24 March 2020, it was reported that three Azoreans who were former passengers of MSC Bellissima during its cruise to Dubai from 7 March 2020 to 14 March had tested positive. (Note: Two cases were from São Miguel Island, a 31-year-old man and a 22-year-old woman, while one case from São Jorge Island had been diagnosed previously, but had been in contact with a newly-diagnosed case from Terceira Island.)

On 2 April 2020, a 22-year-old crew member of MSC Bellissima, who had quarantined himself at home in Trappeto, Sicily, after returning from Dubai, announced that he had tested positive that day.

On 10 April 2020, a dancer from Klagenfurt, Austria, who performed in Cirque du Soleil shows aboard MSC Bellissima, tested positive for the virus while she was still on board the ship. The crew member was tested a day before she was scheduled to leave for home, and the result came as a surprise as she had been asymptomatic. As of 4 May 2020, she has been stuck aboard MSC Bellissima for 50 days.

=== Ovation of the Seas ===
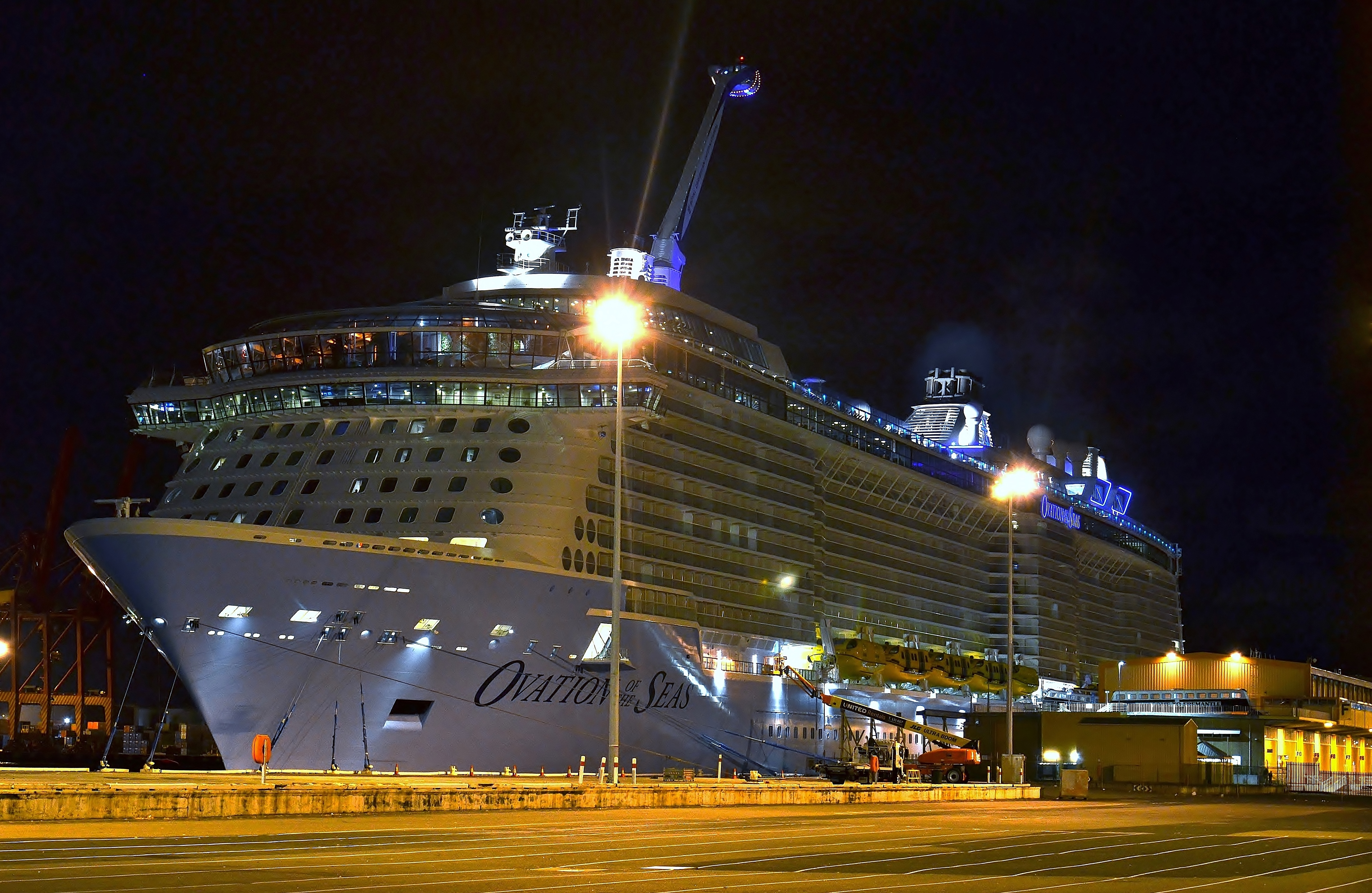
Ovation of the Seas in 2016

Note:

In March 2020 thousands of passengers were ordered to self-isolate after disembarking from Ovation of the Seas in Sydney on 18 March due to COVID-19 fears. NSW Health reported the first positive case associated with Ovation of the Seas on 21 March 2020. 79 passengers subsequently tested positively for the virus. As of 1 April, the ship was located off the coast of New South Wales. The International Transport Workers' Federation had called on the Australian government to allow the crew members to be disembarked so that could be flown to their countries of residence.

On 2 April, a 75-year-old man died in Wollongong Hospital. The ship departed Australia on 4 April 2020 with its crew.

=== Voyager of the Seas ===
Note:

Passengers disembarked from Voyager of the Seas in Sydney on 18 March. NSW Health reported the first positive cases associated with Voyager of the Seas on 21 March 2020.

A man from Toowoomba, Queensland, was infected on the ship and was sent into intensive care unit of a Toowoomba hospital after disembarking but died. On 2 April 34 passengers and 5 crew members had tested positively for the virus in New South Wales alone.

The ship departed Australia on 4 April 2020 with its crew.

On 23 April, a 79-year-old Kāpiti man named Bob James died from the disease while his wife has been infected and sick.

=== Costa Victoria ===
Costa Victoria left Dubai on 7 March 2020. A female Argentine national was tested positive and disembarked in Crete. 726 passengers were quarantined and managed to leave only after the ship docked in Civitavecchia, near Rome, Italy, on 25 March.

=== Artania ===
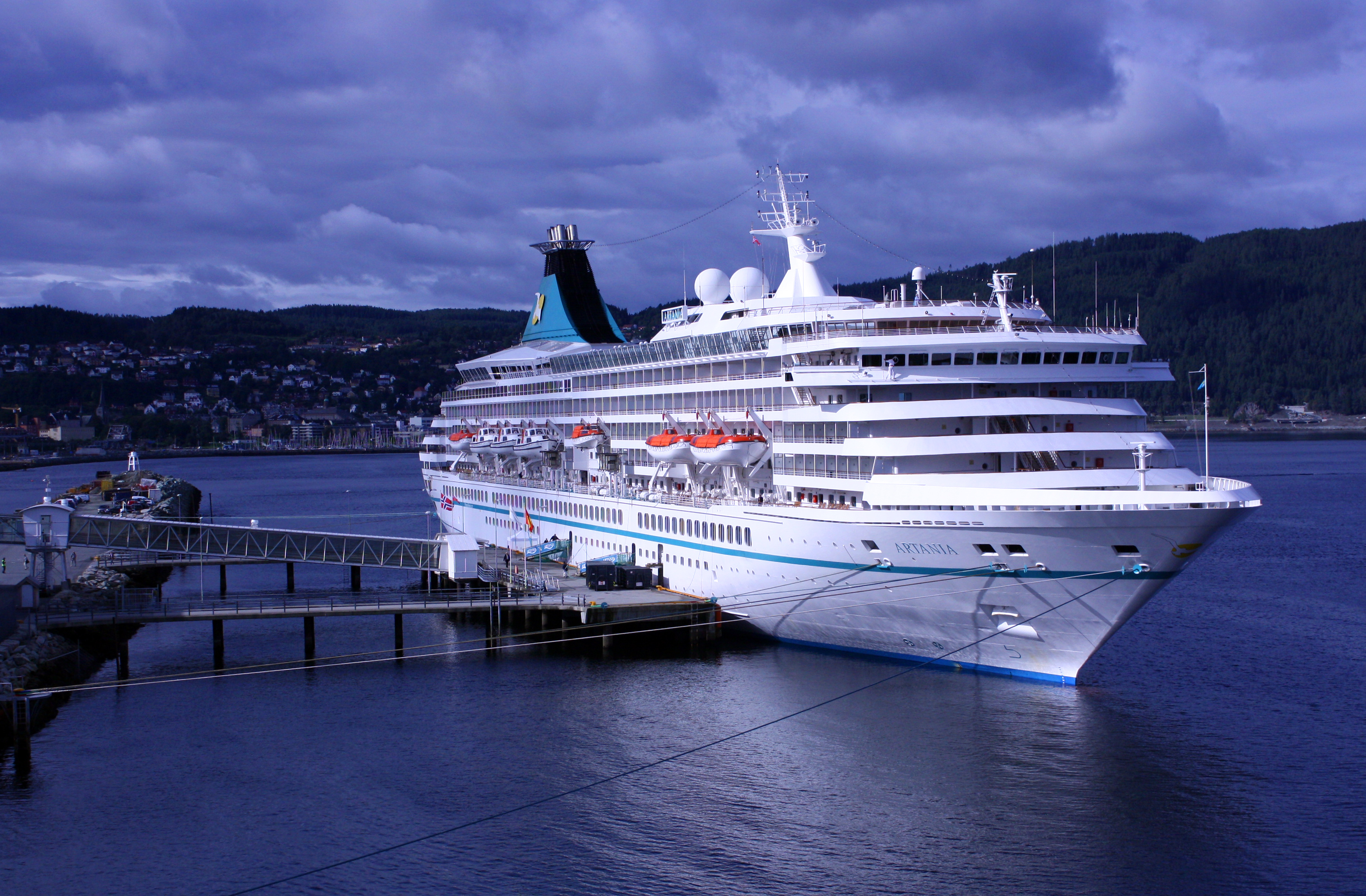
Artania in 2011

It was announced on 26 March 2020 that seven passengers on MV Artania, moored off the coast of Western Australia, had tested positive for coronavirus. The ship docked at Fremantle in Western Australia on 27 March. Most of the 850 passengers flew home from Perth to Germany on 28–29 March. 41 passengers and crew tested positive to COVID-19 and are being treated in Perth hospitals. On 1 April, the ship had 450 crew and about a dozen passengers on board. The Australian Government directed Artania to leave port, but the ship demanded to stay another 14 days, presumably so that they could be treated if COVID-19 symptoms developed. According to the Australian Attorney-General, Christian Porter, "there are still 12 passengers on board some of whom are very unwell. And their level of either illness or frailty is such that they cannot get in a plane."

Artania left Fremantle on 18 April. The cruise line stated that it was travelling back to Germany with eight passengers aboard. It was first scheduled to stop at Bali, Indonesia, on 23 April 2020, and Manila, Philippines, on 28 April 2020, to drop some crew members home before heading to Bremerhaven, Germany, with a skeleton crew of 75 crew members, and arriving around 31 May 2020.

On 23 April, a German man in his 70s, who was a former passenger of Artania, died in Perth at Sir Charles Gairdner Hospital, marking the fourth death linked to Artania.

On 24 April 2020, 57 (Note: Earlier reports stated that 56 crew members had left the ship.) Indonesian crew members came ashore at Port of Tanjung Priok, North Jakarta, and were taken to the emergency field hospital set up at Kemayoran Athletes Village to be tested for the virus and monitored for 14 days. (Note: Despite earlier reports that Artania was going to stop at Bali, apparently no reports have been made of such a stop, so it is assumed that the itinerary changed and Jakarta became the Indonesian stop. In addition, all reports of Artania stopping at Jakarta do not explicitly mention that the cruise ship itself had docked, so it is presumed that it anchored near the port and crew members were transported by other means to the port, especially since one source mentions that there was a pick-up team from TNI Angkatan Laut III, an Indonesian naval base.) Later that day, Yudo Margono, Commander of Indonesia's Joint Regional Defense Command I, announced that 8 of the crew members had tested positive, while the other 49 members tested negative.

It is likely that 8 passengers and 346 (Note: One source reported that 411 people were aboard when Artania left Fremantle, and another reported that there were 8 passengers at the time. Subsequently, another source stated that 57 crew members had been taken to an emergency hospital in Jakarta.) crew members were still on board when Artania left Indonesian waters. It arrived in Manila Bay around 30 April, where 236 crew members disembarked before the ship left the bay later on 1 May. (Note: The ship was located off the coast of Manila along with a number of other cruise ships, including Sun Princess, Costa Venezia, and Carnival Spirit, and stayed in the area for roughly a day before heading out of Manila Bay. It is unclear if the ship actually docked at Manila or not.)

Artania arrived at its home port of Bremerhaven with its last eight passengers on 8 June 2020.

=== Celebrity Apex ===
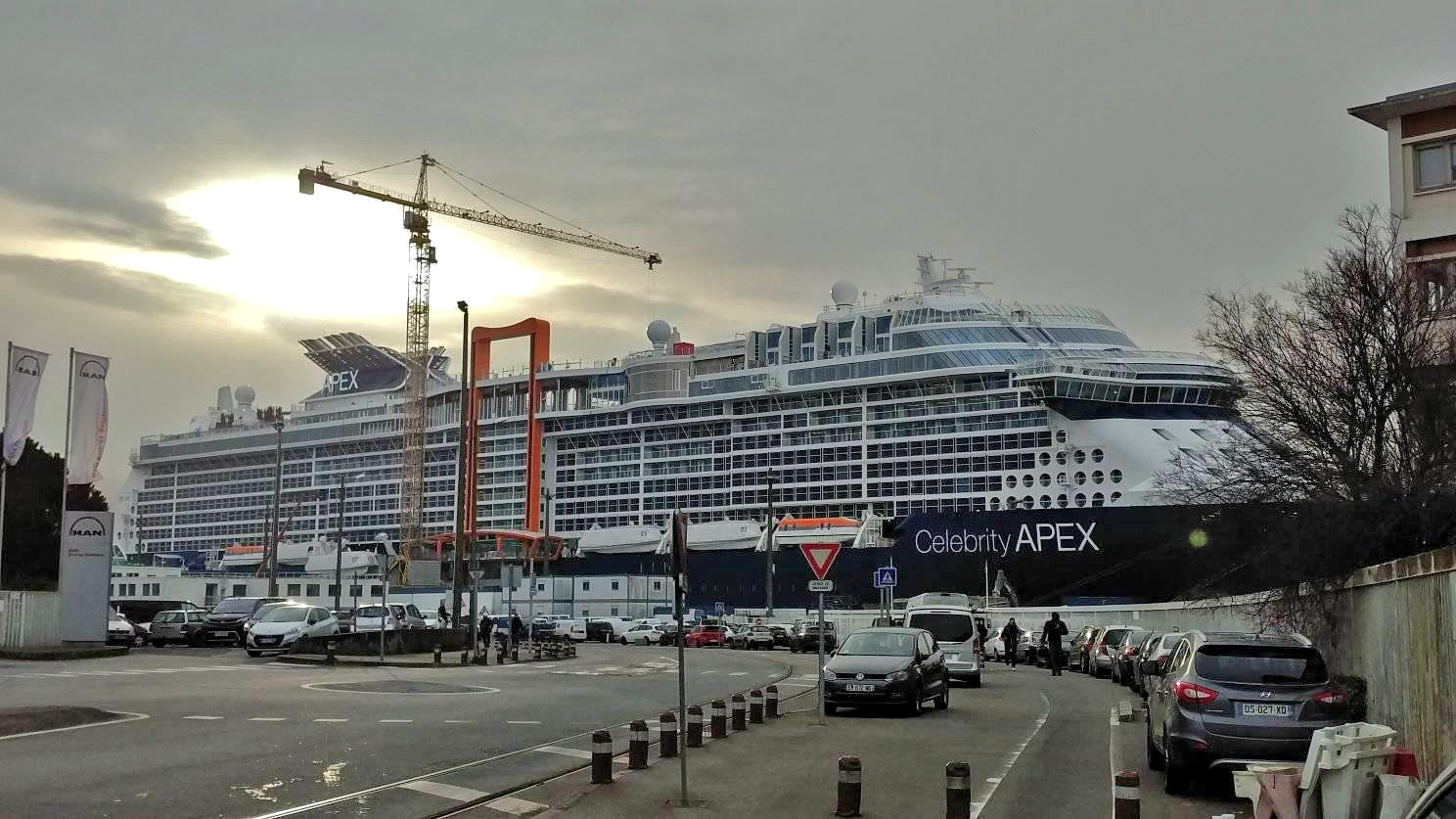
Celebrity Apex being built at Chantiers de l'Atlantique

On 26 March 2020, the Regional Health Agency of the French region Pays de la Loire reported that seven crew members aboard Celebrity Apex had tested positive for coronavirus. At the time, Celebrity Apex was docked at Chantiers de l'Atlantique in Saint-Nazaire, where it had been built, and was waiting to be delivered to Celebrity Cruises. There were 1,407 crew members already on board at the time.

Before the first positive cases were reported, practices aboard Celebrity Apex did not reflect the seriousness of the progression of the pandemic at the time. For example, a large party was held on 21 March 2020, even though the whole country of France had been under lockdown since 17 March 2020, four days earlier. However, once the first seven crew members tested positive, the whole crew was placed in isolation and forbidden to leave the ship.

The next day, on 27 March 2020, the ship was delivered virtually to Celebrity Cruises in what was believed to be the first virtual delivery of a cruise ship, necessitated due to the pandemic and the travel restrictions that were in place. That night, it was reported that 29 people had tested positive for the virus, and one person had been brought to a hospital with breathing issues.

By 31 March 2020, 157 persons had tested positive and 2 had been hospitalised; by the next week, on 7 April 2020, 217 persons had tested positive, with 4 hospitalised and 2 in intensive care; and by the following week, on 15 April 2020, 224 persons had tested positive, out of 1,444 people tested.

Because of how Celebrity Cruises treated the crew of Celebrity Apex during the pandemic, a crew member of Celebrity Apex, who tested positive for the virus on 30 March 2020, filed a class action lawsuit against the cruise line on 14 April 2020 "on behalf of all ... similarly situated crewmembers working aboard [Celebrity Cruise's] vessels." The lawsuit alleged that Celebrity Cruises failed to provide proper personal protective equipment (PPE), allowed independent contractors to freely enter and exit the ship, failed to test people boarding the ship for symptoms of coronavirus, failed to enact appropriate lockdown measures, and failed to provide "prompt, proper, and adequate medical care" to its employees, amongst other claims.

=== Costa Favolosa ===
Costa Favolosa departed from Guadeloupe. Six of the disembarked occupants of the ship were tested positive for COVID-19. On 26 March, as the ship stopped three miles offshore from Miami, the U.S. Coast Guard reported evacuation of seven sick crew member, out of 1,009 who stayed aboard. On 8 April 2020 an Indian crew member died from the disease after being hospitalised in a Miami Hospital on 29 March.

=== MSC Splendida ===
On 23 March 2020, around 14:00 CET, a Thai crew member working aboard MSC Splendida as a buffet attendant was medically evacuated via lifeboat after she exhibited symptoms consistent with the coronavirus disease and was having difficulty breathing. (Note: She had developed a fever and a sore throat for three days, and her health had been worsening.) At the time, the ship was near the island of Sardinia and headed to Marseille (Note: The cruise originally was supposed to end at Genoa on 29 March 2020, but the trip was cut short and the end of the cruise was moved up to 24 March when it docked at Marseille.) to disembark all of its passengers. (Note: MSC Cruises stated on 19 March 2020 that there were 1721 passengers aboard, while another source stated that, at one point, around 800 were supposed to be disembarking at Marseille, with the wording leaving it being possibly ambiguous as to whether this was referring to the number of passengers or crew. In addition, it is unclear if any passengers disembarked during the five days before the ship docked at Marseille.)

On 24 March 2020, MSC Cruises informed the crew that the sick crew member had tested negative. However, two days later, on 26 March, it was reported that the sick crew member had been tested again, and this time, the test had returned positive. As a result, 16 crew members were placed under quarantine. The ship later docked in Genoa so that some of its crew members could disembark.

By 1 April 2020, 26 crew members had been placed under quarantine, with 3 crew members running high temperatures.

=== Sun Princess ===
Princess Cruises ship Sun Princess was not allowed to dock at a port in Madagascar on 13 February 2020, as it had visited Thailand less than 14 days before. The ship docked at the French island of Réunion on 1 March, but passengers were met by a crowd of about 30 who insisted that the passengers be tested and tried to prevent them from leaving the port area. Objects were thrown at passengers, and the police deployed tear gas. Princess Cruises said that there was no evidence of SARS-CoV-2 on the ship.

On 26 March 2020, the Department of Health of Western Australia announced that a passenger from Sun Princess had tested positive for the virus.

=== Zaandam and Rotterdam ===
The Holland America cruise ship MS Zaandam was stranded off the coast of Chile after being denied entry to ports from 14 March. Of the 1,829 people (1,243 passengers, 586 crew) aboard, 13 passengers and 29 crew members fell ill with "flu-like symptoms". The vessel sailed for Port Everglades, Florida, U.S., hoping to dock on 30 March with 77 sick persons aboard as of 24 March. Four passengers died while waiting for permission to transit the Panama Canal, while the number of sick aboard climbed to 148. Two passengers tested positive for COVID-19. The ship was initially denied transit through the Panama Canal due to the number of sick people on board, but on 28 March 2020, both Zaandam and the accompanying vessel Rotterdam were cleared by the Panama Department of Health to transit through the Panama Canal towards their destination in Florida. Asymptomatic passengers and some medical staff were transferred from Zaandam to Rotterdam while they were both anchored thirteen kilometres (8 mi) offshore on 28 March. 53 guests and 85 crew members aboard Zaandam reported flu-like symptoms. By 31 March 2020, the number reported as being "ill" had increased to 193.

Rotterdam followed Zaandam on its way to Florida. An unstated number of passengers from Zaandam were transferred to the second vessel on 28 March 2020. At that time, the crew of Zaandam included four physicians and four nurses while Rotterdam had two physicians and four nurses.

As of 30 March 2020, Holland America had not received permission to dock either vessel at Port Everglades in Fort Lauderdale as planned. According to an Associated Press report, the city's mayor, Dean Trantalis, "said he didn't want the ship to dock near his city, at least without extensive precautions". The governor of Florida was also hesitant to accept Zaandam at Fort Lauderdale because the state already had so much to deal with during the pandemic; as of 31 March 2020, a decision had not yet been made. The president of Holland America made a public plea for acceptance of the ship and expressed concern that various ports in several countries had been reluctant to provide provisions and medical supplies.

President Donald Trump said on 1 April 2020 that "we have to help the people" [on the ships] and that discussions were underway about Canada and the United Kingdom "arranging flights to retrieve their citizens from the ship". News reports on 2 April stated that the ships would be allowed to dock at Port Everglades that afternoon. The cruise line was making arrangements for passengers who were fit to travel to their home countries to leave via chartered aircraft, directly from the ship to bus and then to aeroplane. From the 442 passengers on Zaandam and 808 passengers on Rotterdam there are 107 passengers and 143 crew from 1,186 crew that had influenza-like symptoms, those who had mild symptoms were quarantined in staterooms, and will be released later. All crew, no matter their condition, must stay on board.

A report on 4 April stated that "14 critically ill people" were taken to area hospitals while the others were allowed to disembark when flights to their destinations were available.

=== Horizon ===
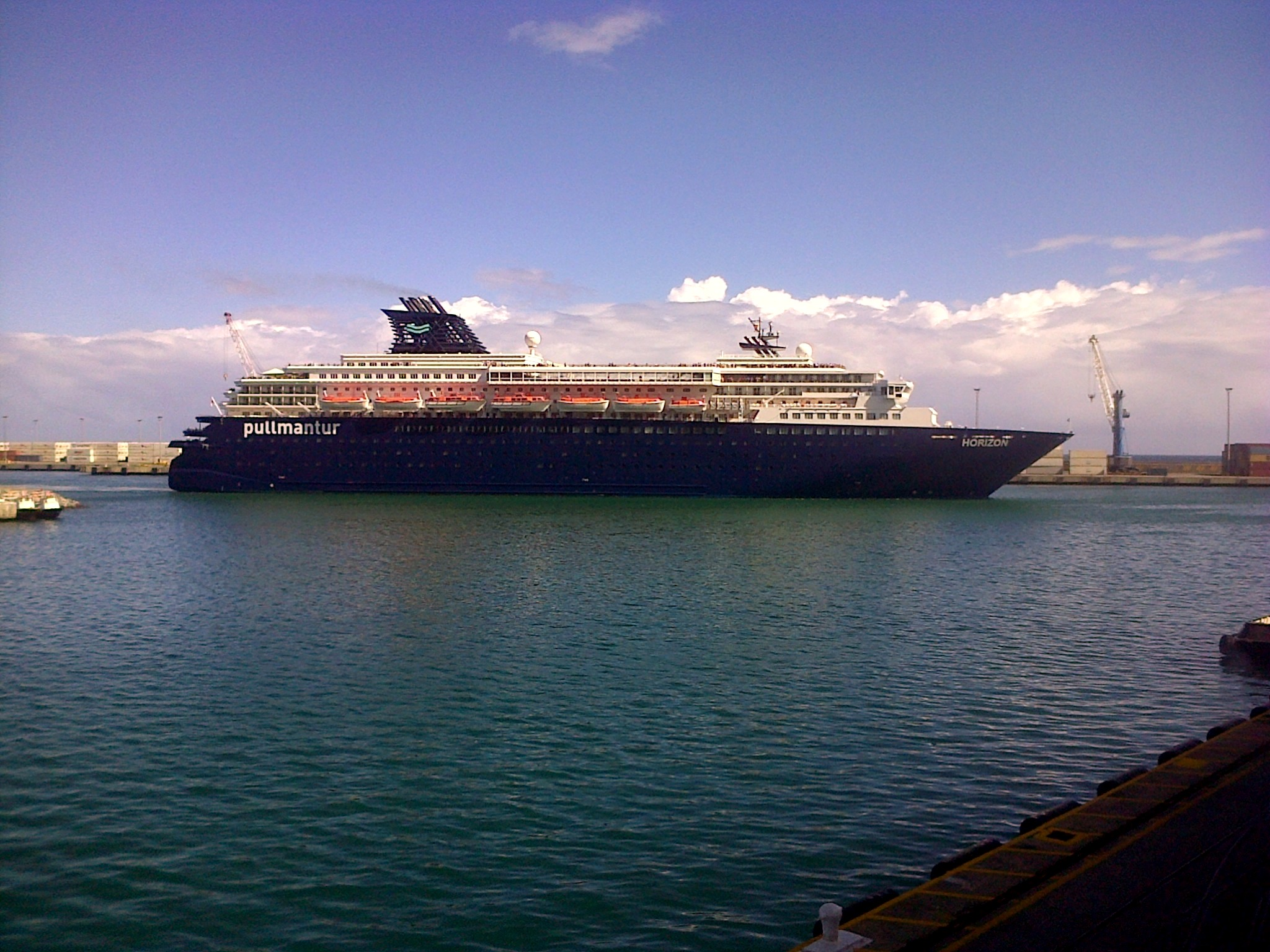
Horizon in 2013

An anonymous crew member of the Horizon reported on 28 March 2020 that a member of the crew had tested positive on 26 March 2020. With about 250 crew members and contractors aboard, the ship had docked at Port Rashid in Dubai on 15 March 2020, and the crew has been isolated and under lockdown since.

On 20 March 2020, another crew member reported that out of 20 crew members tested, 11 were confirmed positive. Another crew member reported on 4 April 2020 that, starting on 2 April 2020, all the crew members were being tested, and on 4 April 2020, results were delivered to crew members individually. Almost half or more than half of the crew had tested positive.

=== Oasis of the Seas ===
On 29 March 2020, the Miami Herald reported that 14 crew members of Oasis of the Seas had tested positive for coronavirus. At that time, the vessel had been at anchor near Port Miami since mid-March. The passengers had disembarked for flights to their home countries but the ship remained in the area. As of 10 April 2020, seven crew members had been taken to nearby hospitals within a week. One member of the crew, a Filipino bartender, died of COVID-19 on 18 April. Another crew member, a 41-year-old Indonesian waiter, died of the disease in a hospital in Fort Lauderdale on 20 April. A third crew member, a long-term employee who worked in the incinerator room, died in a Broward County hospital during the morning of 3 May.

=== Liberty of the Seas ===
Port of Galveston officials confirmed on 30 March 2020 that two crew members of Liberty of the Seas had tested positive for coronavirus. One was asymptomatic, and remained in quarantine on board the ship, while the other, who showed visible symptoms, disembarked and was hospitalised in Galveston, Texas. The ship left port on the same day, and returned to port on 15 April 2020 after spending roughly two weeks off the coast of Texas.

=== Coral Princess ===
News reports in early April 2020 indicated that Coral Princess, with 1,020 passengers and 878 crew, with some experiencing flu-like symptoms, was hoping to be allowed to dock at Port Everglades in Fort Lauderdale to allow passengers to disembark. A news item on 2 April 2020 stated that "Passengers have been confined to their rooms...when the company noticed a higher than normal number of flu-like cases on board". Reports then specified that "out of 13 passengers and crew tested for COVID-19 on board the Coral Princess, 12 were positive." Officials in Broward County, Florida, said that a plan was not yet in place to handle the situation.

Coral Princess was diverted and finally docked at the Port of Miami on the afternoon of 4 April with its over 1,000 passengers and 878 crew members. A CNN report that evening indicated that two passengers had died and some others were ill, including the 12 that had tested positive for COVID-19. Those who were not ill were to disembark when flights to their destinations were available; this was expected to take some days. A subsequent news report later that evening stated that four passengers were scheduled to be taken to Florida hospitals and added that 67 persons would not be allowed to disembark.

On 6 April, the death of a third passenger was announced. By that afternoon, 684 passengers had disembarked, those who needed medical care had been taken from the vessel and 274 were still on the Coral Princess. Charter flights had departed to Canada, California, Australia and the United Kingdom; others were expected to leave Florida the next day.

The vessel left Port Miami on 10 April 2020 with its crew and 13 international passengers who were unable to return to their home countries due to travel restrictions. No destination was revealed but it appeared that the ship would initially remain at sea for a period of quarantine.

In October 2022, the ship was again infected with COVID-19, this time off the coasts of Western Australia. A spokesperson for the company said that staff and crew had tested positive while sailing from Broome, Western Australia to the southwest part of the state.

=== Disney Wonder ===
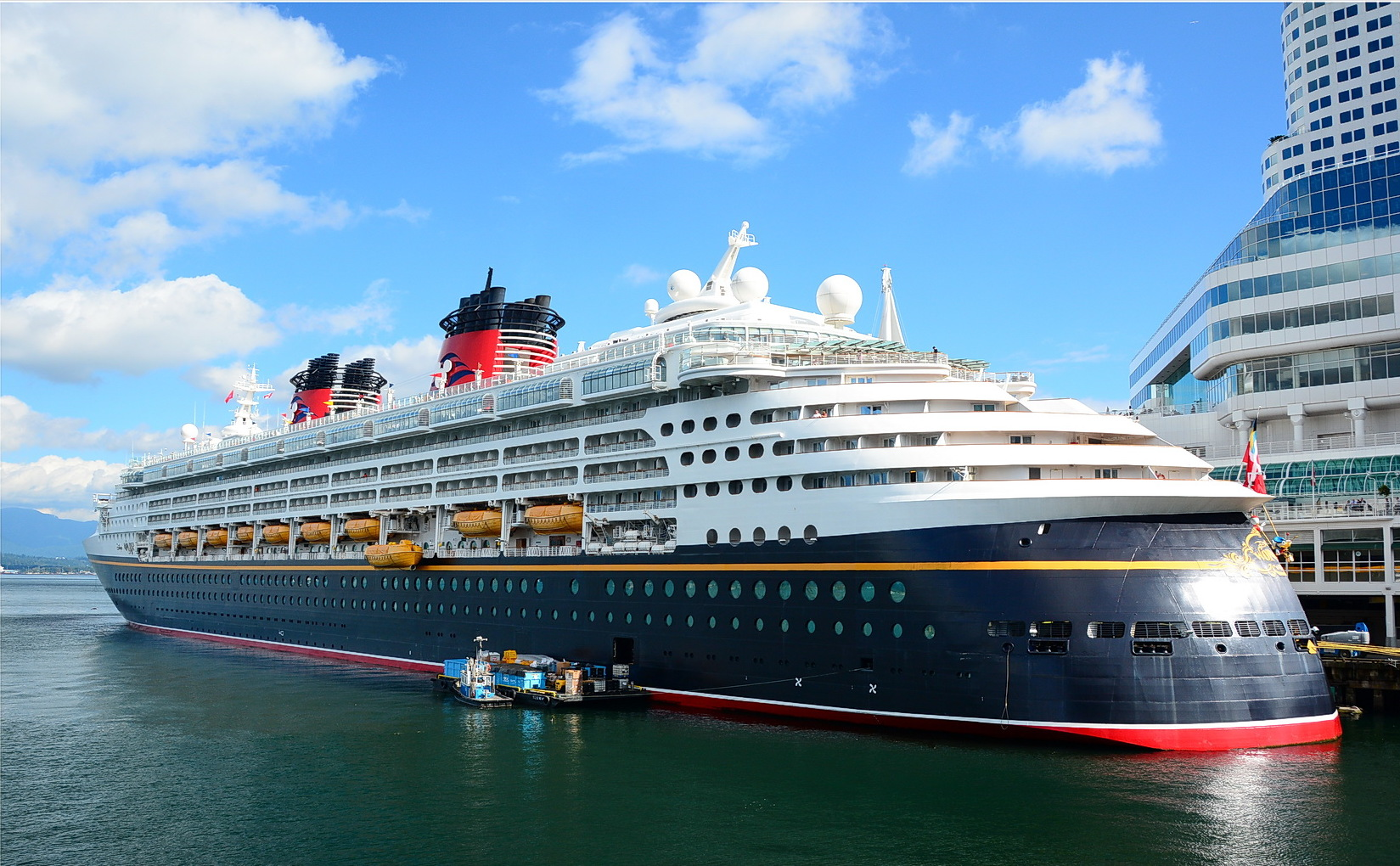
Disney Wonder in 2014

Disney Wonder arrived at the Port of San Diego on 19 March 2020, where 1,980 passengers disembarked; there were no reports that any had flu-like symptoms. By 5 April 38 crew members had reportedly tested positive, according to a report by Cruise Law News, based on discussions with unnamed individuals on the ship. Disney Cruise Line, however, told other news media that none of the crew had tested positive.

A passenger who disembarked at San Diego on 20 March reported that no health screening activities, such as the asking of health-related questions or the taking of temperatures, occurred upon disembarkation, and that the only health screening that occurred was during the check-in process two weeks prior.

The crew was tested for the virus again in the middle of May, with around 200 crew members testing positive.

=== Greg Mortimer ===
On 7 April 2020, Greg Mortimer, which held 114 passengers, was stranded in Uruguay for a week and asking for help after people exhibited symptoms such as fever, which prompted authorities to ban them from disembarking. After the Uruguayan medical teams boarded the cruise ship to test passengers, staff and crew on 1 April. 81 people tested positive for COVID-19, with six people being evacuated and transferred to hospitals having become ill with COVID-19.

A news report on 8 April stated that the ship had not yet received permission to dock, although an evacuation flight to Australia and New Zealand was being arranged by Uruguayan authorities. By that time, 128 persons on the vessel had tested positive for COVID-19. Six had been transferred to a hospital in Montevideo. Passengers from Europe and America who had positive tests would not be allowed to travel to their home countries until their subsequent tests indicated negative results.

Greg Mortimer was eventually able to dock in Montevideo on 10 April 2020. A total of 112 passengers (96 Australians and 16 New Zealanders) were transported via a humanitarian corridor of ambulances and buses to Montevideo's Carrasco International Airport, where they boarded a chartered Hi Fly Airbus A340-300 flight to Australia. (Note: The direct flight, one of the longest passenger flights ever at a length of roughly 12,400 km, 6,700 nmi, cost roughly 15,000 AUD per passenger, as the plane was refitted as a medical plane, had to be flown first from Portugal to Uruguay before flying to Australia and then back to Europe, had to be cleaned extensively following the flight, and required two flight crews.) The plane landed in Melbourne early on 12 April, and all passengers subsequently entered a 14-day quarantine in a hotel.

Two Australians remained in Uruguay as they remained in intensive care at a hospital. Passengers of other nationalities also remained on board the ship pending negotiations with their home countries.

=== Pride of America ===
The Hawaii Department of Transportation reported on 8 April 2020 that six crew members of MS Pride of America had tested positive for coronavirus. Two of the crew members were taken to a hospital for treatment, while the other patients were isolated on board the ship. Another positive case was later announced, bringing the total number of cases to seven.

Following the suspension of cruise operations to mitigate the effect of the pandemic, Pride of America has not carried passengers since 14 March 2020, and is currently docked at Honolulu Harbor, its home base, with a complement of roughly 500 crew members. It is scheduled to travel to the mainland to enter dry dock with about 200 crew members, with the other 300 crew members heading directly back to their home states.

=== Celebrity Flora ===
The Provincial Emergency Operations Committee in the Galápagos Islands of Ecuador reported on 14 April 2020 that 69 crew members of Celebrity Flora were tested, and 48 tests returned positive for coronavirus. The positive crew members remained isolated on board the ship, located at Baltra Island. The new cases increased the total case count of the islands to 72.

=== Monarch ===
On 14 March, Panama repatriated 1,504 Colombian tourists from the cruise ship MS Monarch. Since the port of Cartagena, Colombia, was closed, the people had to fly from Colón, Panama. About 300 people were still waiting to buy tickets.

On 17 April 2020, a Honduran crew member died of the virus in a hospital in Panama City. He had been medically evacuated after having trouble breathing, and tested positive at the hospital.

=== Costa Atlantica ===
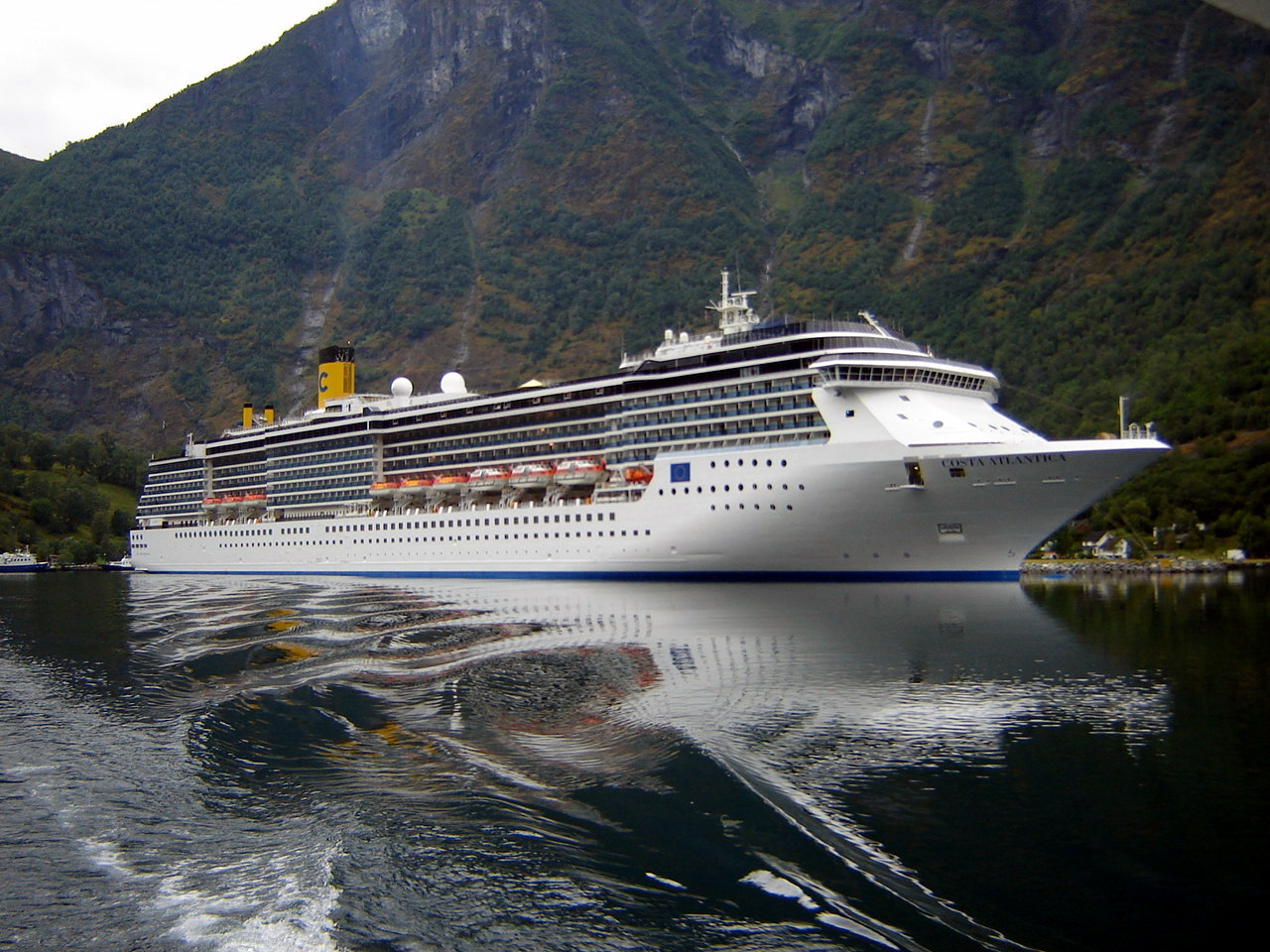
Costa Atlantica in 2009

On 20 April 2020, a positive case was reported aboard Costa Atlantica, (Note: Some sources reported a positive case aboard a ship called "Costa Atranchica", but these sources appear to be from countries that do not have a significant population that is familiar with the Japanese language, and may be mistranslating the Japanese transcription of Costa Atlantica (either 「コスタ・アトランティカ」 or 「コスタ・アトランチカ」) by transliteration of the "ラ" as "ra" instead of "la" and the "チ" as "chi" instead of "ti".) while docked at the Koyagi Factory of Mitsubishi Heavy Industries Nagasaki Shipyard in Nagasaki where it was under repairs from 20 February to 25 March 2020. (Note: The ship was originally scheduled for repairs in China, but the repair order was transferred to Mitsubishi Heavy Industries after the pandemic began in China.) A doctor had collected samples from four suspected cases and conducted PCR tests, with three negative results and one positive. The positive case had a fever beginning on 14 April 2020. About 20 other crew members started developing fevers in the week before the first case was reported.

Costa Atlantica had 623 crew members and no passengers at the time the first positive case was first reported. There were 56 crew members that had heavy contact with the positive case. They were all quarantined, and PCR tests were planned for all of them. The prefecture considered requesting assistance from the Self-Defense Forces to help manage the situation.

On 22 April 2020, officials of the prefecture announced that, of the 56 additional tests conducted, an additional 33 crew members had tested positive, bringing the total number of positive cases to 34. The other 23 tests returned negative. On 23 April, it was announced that 48 tests in total returned positive, with 14 of the positive cases being cooks or people serving food. On 24 April, officials stated that 91 people had tested positive, with one patient being hospitalised. Officials also noted that even though Costa Atlantica had been quarantined upon its arrival in Japan, with its crew ordered not to leave the quay unless they needed to visit a hospital, some crew members had left without informing the officials.

On 25 April, Television Nagasaki announced that 57 new cases had been discovered, bringing the total number of positive cases to 148. As of 4 May, the number had increased to 149. Those crew members that tested negative began flying home from Japan on 4 May. On 31 May, after all remaining crew tested negative for the virus, the cruise ship departed Nagasaki for Manila.

=== MSC Seaview ===
On 30 April 2020, A Tribuna reported that the Brazilian Health Regulatory Agency confirmed the notification of 10 crew members aboard MSC Seaview that had tested positive for the virus. The ship entered quarantine at the Port of Santos on the same day, shortly after the notification.

On 5 May 2020, Empresa Brasil de Comunicação reported that there were 80 confirmed cases of the virus at that point, with another 30 suspected cases, out of 615 crew members aboard. Later that day, the number of confirmed cases rose to 86.

=== Mein Schiff 3 ===
On 1 May 2020, TUI Cruises confirmed that a crew member aboard their ship Mein Schiff 3 had tested positive for the virus. (Note: The crew member had actually tested positive the day before.) At the time, the ship was located at Cuxhaven, Germany, with 2899 crew members aboard, a number normally highly unusual for a cruise ship, but was a result of the company deciding to transfer crew members from other ships, including Mein Schiff 4 and Mein Schiff 6, to this ship. Crew members aboard Mein Schiff 3 have strongly complained about the mismanagement and general cluelessness of those higher up, and about the difficulty of attempting to isolate on such a crowded ship. It has also been pointed out that TUI Cruises' statement contained factual inaccuracies.

By 3 May 2020, the entire crew of Mein Schiff 3 had been tested, with 8 tests returning positive and about a third of the tests still being processed. The rest of the tests were processed by 6 May 2020, at which point 9 positive cases had been found.

=== MSC Preziosa ===
On 1 May 2020, CrewCenter reported that two crew members aboard MSC Preziosa had tested positive for the virus. The first positive result was announced to the crew on 30 April 2020 and the second on 1 May. The positive results came as a surprise for many of the crew, as no one had boarded the ship since 23 March, well over a month earlier, and all crew members had been isolating themselves in guest cabins since 11 April, nearly three weeks earlier.

=== Seven Seas Navigator ===
On 21 May 2020, it was reported that a female crew member aboard Seven Seas Navigator had tested positive for the virus, and that a second crew member was also showing symptoms of the virus. The ship had subsequently requested entry to the Port of Barcelona, and the Ministry of Health granted them an exception to do so. After docking, both sick crew members were given serological tests, and both returned positive. (Note: They were also given polymerase chain reaction tests, but no results appear to have been reported as of 2020.05.23.) Both crew members have been isolated, and the rest of the roughly 450 crew members of the ship have been placed under quarantine.

=== Adventure of the Seas ===
On 22 May 2020, Loop Jamaica reported that 5 crew members of Adventure of the Seas recently repatriated to Jamaica had tested positive for the virus. The ship had docked at Falmouth, Jamaica, on 19 May 2020 after drifting in Caribbean waters waiting for clearance to dock because Jamaica had closed its borders. Aboard were 1044 Jamaican crew members, all to be repatriated and tested for the virus, and over 300 crew members who were foreign nationals, who would not be allowed to disembark.

By 24 May 2020, 9 crew members in total had tested positive; by 26 May 19 in total had tested positive, and 624 negative.

=== Mein Schiff 1 ===
On 21 July 2020, Cruise Law News reported that crew members aboard Mein Schiff 1 stated that seven crew members had tested positive for the virus.

TUI Cruises had planned to restart its cruise schedule with a series of "Blue Cruises", short cruises of a few days in length that made no stops aside from arriving at its port of departure. Mein Schiff 1 was to have launched from the Port of Kiel on 31 July 2020, but TUI Cruises cancelled the trip, citing issues assembling a crew in time due to coronavirus travel restrictions. However, Cruise Law News requested additional information from crew members, and two responded stating that the crew had already been assembled, but the real reason the trip was cancelled was because of the seven positive test results, all from crew members that had only recently joined the crew. Der Kreuzfahrttester suggested a third possible reason for the cancellation: TUI Cruises was unable to find enough people willing to work for the company due to how badly the company handled the coronavirus crisis.

The first Blue Cruise aboard Mein Schiff 1 was rescheduled for 3 August 2020.

Eventually, on 29 July, TUI Cruises admitted that five crew members had tested positive for the virus.

=== Roald Amundsen ===
On 31 July 2020, the University Hospital of North Norway (UNN) announced that four crew members aboard MS Roald Amundsen had tested positive for the virus. (Note: They were the first coronavirus patients admitted to UNN since 5 June.)

Norwegian cruise line Hurtigruten was the first ocean cruise line in the world to resume cruise operations, with MS Otto Sverdrup sailing from Bergen to Kirkenes on 16 June 2020. Hurtigruten's Roald Amundsen resumed its cruises on 17 July with a seven-day roundtrip cruise from Tromsø to Svalbard, followed by another that departed on 24 July.

Several days before arriving back in Tromsø on 31 July, two crew members became sick and were isolated. (Note: Hurtigruten claimed that the two crew members were isolated for a different illness.) Upon arrival at Tromsø, they were tested for coronavirus, and both test results were positive. As a result, all 160 crew members were to be tested.

Many passengers had already disembarked and had been making their way home before the news broke about the infected crew, with one bus driver stating that he had driven 28 passengers from Roald Amundsen to the airport hours before the news broke. Some passengers stated that they first learned of the news via online news media. Hurtigruten stated that they would inform the passengers of both cruises about their potential exposure to the virus via SMS. There were 209 passengers aboard the 17 July cruise, and 177 aboard the 24 July cruise.

Later that evening, it was revealed that a passenger from Vesterålen aboard the 17 July cruise had tested positive for the virus days earlier, and that on 29 July, an official from Vesterålen clearly informed at least four people in Hurtigruten, as well as the Norwegian Institute of Public Health (NIPH), about the positive case, and recommended that all passengers be informed on the same day. However, Hurtigruten had believed there was no need to worry.

All 177 passengers aboard the 24 July cruise and all 160 crew members were required to enter quarantine. Roald Amundsen was originally scheduled to set sail for Svalbard again that afternoon, but the cruise was cancelled, and the ship's next planned voyage was scheduled for the beginning of September.

The next day, on 1 August, Tromsø Mayor Gunnar Wilhelmsen announced that an additional 29 crew members had tested positive, meaning that 33 people had tested positive in total so far. Later that evening, Mayor Wilhelmsen confirmed that 36 people had tested positive so far, including one passenger. The mayor disapproved of how Hurtigruten had handled the situation, stating that he believed the passengers should have been informed and quarantined before the ship had docked in Tromsø, and that he worried that a major outbreak might occur because passengers had wandered around the city before they were notified about the sick crew members. Troms Parliament Member Kent Gudmundsen expressed shock over Hurtigruten's management of the situation, and Minister of Health and Care Services Bent Høie praised the efforts of Tromsø and the NIPH in containing the virus. Up to 69 municipalities might have been affected by the outbreak, and officials had still been unable to contact 20 of the 177 passengers aboard the 27 July cruise by evening.

As of 3 August 2020, four of the passengers who were on the two cruises had tested positive for the virus.

=== Paul Gauguin ===
On 1 August 2020, Polynésie la 1ère reported that a case of the virus had been found aboard MS Paul Gauguin. The passengers were told about the case that same day, and the ship immediately turned around, skipping its next port of call in Rangiroa, and headed back toward Papeete. All the passengers were requested to stay in their cabins while food was brought to them.

The ship had left Tahiti on 30 July, and had made a stopover in Bora Bora before Compagnie du Ponant, owner of Paul Gauguin, was aware of the presence of an asymptomatic case of the virus in a 22-year-old American female passenger. (Note: The Guardian reported that the case was found in a crew member, but many other sources reported that it was found in a female passenger. Seatrade Cruise News reported that the passenger was tested aboard the ship, following the rule that tourists must be tested within four days after arrival in French Polynesia.) During the stopover, both the passengers and the crew had been able to disembark and interact with the locals of Bora Bora for two days.

Once Paul Gauguin arrived back in Papeete on the morning of 2 August, all 148 passengers and 192 crew members were placed in confinement. The asymptomatic American was travelling with her mother, who had tested negative, and both were disembarked and escorted to a hotel where they were placed under isolation.

=== SeaDream I ===
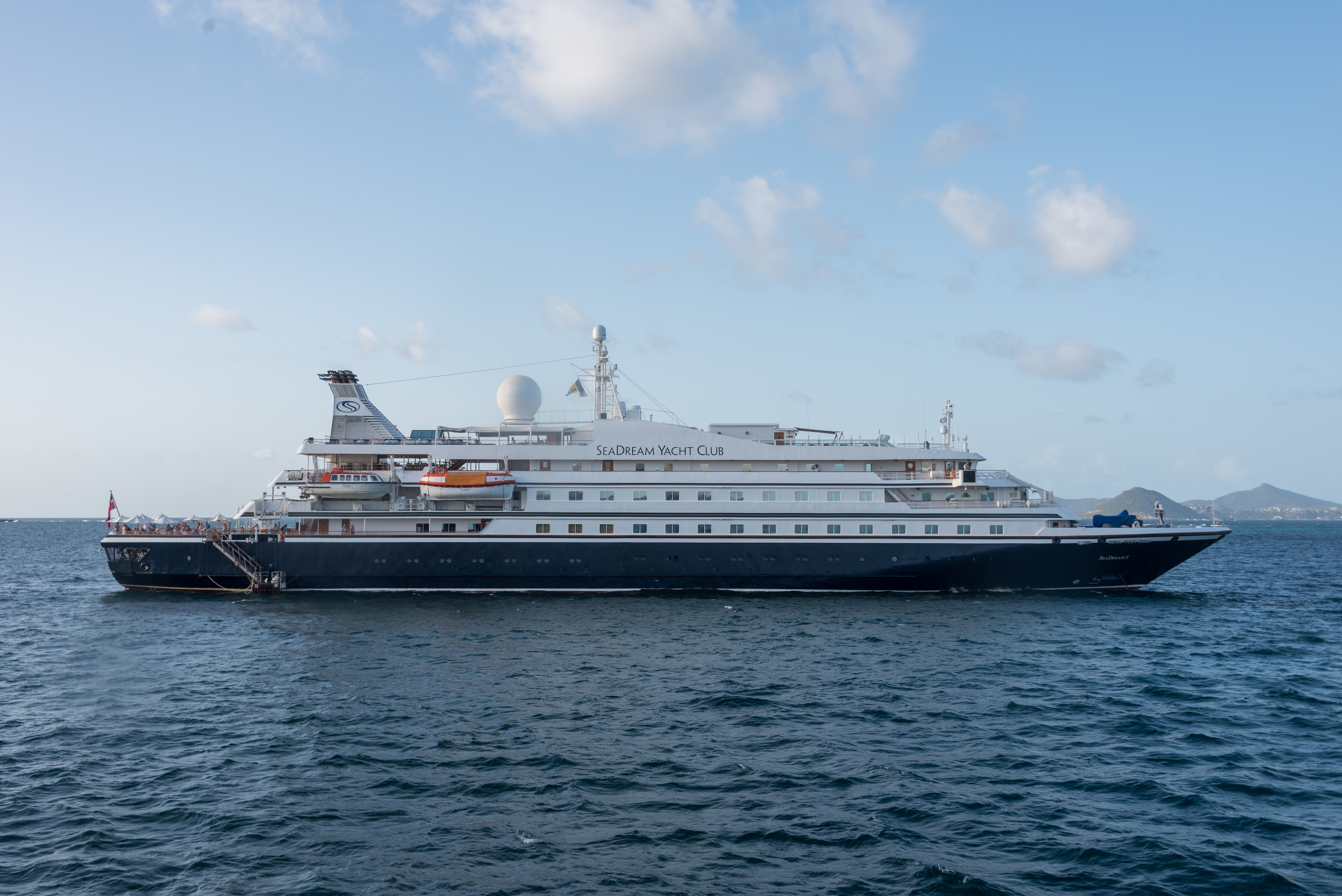
SeaDream I in 2017

On 11 November 2020, the Government of Barbados received a request for assistance from SeaDream I with reports of a suspected positive case of COVID-19 on board, Six passengers aboard SeaDream I were later confirmed to have been infected with COVID-19. Subsequently, there was an additional case recorded.

On 15 November 2020 it was reported that one crew member had also tested positive.

On 17 November 2020 it was reported that 7 guests and two crew members aboard SeaDream 1 tested positive for COVID-19. SeaDream has cancelled all remaining 2020 cruises following the outbreak.

=== MS Asuka II ===
On 30 April 2021, while en route from the Port of Yokohama to northern Japan, one passenger tested positive for COVID-19 aboard the MS Asuka II. Passengers were disembarked while the positive case was in isolation in a cabin and in stable condition.

== Ships without confirmed cases on board ==
=== Suspected cases ===
- Costa Diadema: On 24 March 2020, the ship docked at Limassol, Cyprus, and a crew member suspected of having the coronavirus was taken to hospital. Several other crew members were also reported to be ill. Costa Diadema was sailing from Dubai to Savona, Italy, without passengers.
- Golden Princess: At least three passengers have been quarantined by the ship's doctor, according to local health officials. It was en route for Melbourne on 18 March 2020. As of 1 April 2020, it was docked in Melbourne.
- Mahabaahu: Several passengers and crew members were quarantined after an American passenger who have travelled in the ship in Brahmaputra River in Assam, India, was tested positive in Bhutan.
- Marella Dream: On 28 March 2020, it was announced that a crew member of MS Marella Dream had died on 27 March with coronavirus-like symptoms. The crew member was a 48-year-old Indonesian national. A spokesperson for TUI Group, owner of the ship, stated that "[t]he crew member had underlying health issues and had not tested positive for Covid-19 and there are no positive cases of Covid-19 on board the ship", leading sources to conclude that either he had not been tested, (Note: This is possibly because the spokesperson had not been reported to have stated that the crew member had tested negative.) or that he had died of the virus. Marella Dream had spent the week prior anchored near Gibraltar when the crew requested permission shortly before sunset on 26 March to disembark a sick crew member for medical treatment. It was decided to transfer the crew member during daylight hours, around 07:30 the next morning, but the crew member's condition worsened overnight and he died at 04:47. Subsequently, public health officials refused permission for the disembarkation of the body and the government asked the ship to leave British Gibraltar Territorial Waters. A spokesperson for the Gibraltar government stated that any inquiry into the death of the crew member was the responsibility of Malta, the ship's flag state. At the time of the crew member's death, there were 560 (Note: It is unclear if this number included the recently deceased.) crew members and no passengers aboard. Marella Dream later docked in Málaga, Spain, on 28 March, to disembark the deceased crew member.
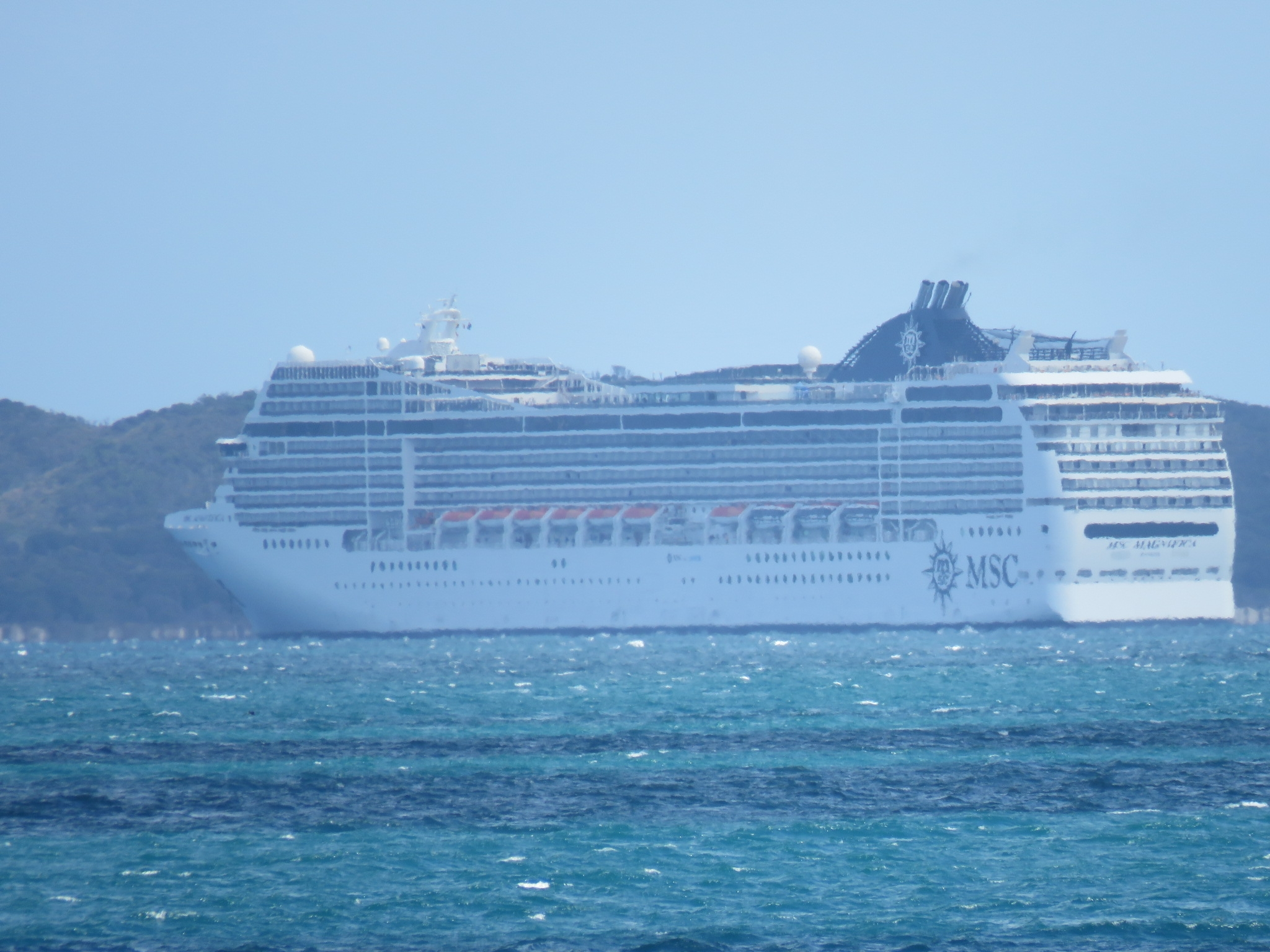
- MSC Magnifica anchored off the coast of Western Australia
  MSC Magnifica: Premier of Western Australia Mark McGowan claimed that there were 250 suspected cases on board, while MSC Cruises' claimed that all aboard were in good health. It was later conjectured that this was a result of miscommunication, as 250 passengers had "visited the medical room in the past two weeks", for issues such as painkillers and dressings, by 23 March 2020, when the ship was heading for Fremantle, Australia to disembark patients to hospitals and isolation. Before reaching Fremantle, MSC Magnifica had been able to let a few hundred passengers off in Sydney and Melbourne, "under strict conditions", but the cruise ship was denied entry into Western Australia. The ship was subsequently denied entry to Dubai and was still in the Perth area on 25 March. It eventually set sail for Sri Lanka, where, on 6 April, the vessel made a "technical stop" in Colombo. Here, a 75-year-old female German passenger with heart problems who needed urgent care and a Sri Lankan chef was allowed to disembark. The German passenger subsequently died. On 20 April 2020, MSC Magnifica docked in Marseille, France, letting out all its passengers and terminating the cruise. MSC Cruises stated that no passengers and no crew members had shown any coronavirus symptoms.
- MSC Musica: On 2020.04.29, A Tribuna reported that a 32-year-old Indian crew member of MSC Musica had tested positive for the coronavirus. The crew member was initially admitted to hospital for emergency care due to anaemia, and had tested negative for the virus upon admission. However, when the crew member was scheduled for discharge, another test was performed, which returned positive. It is unclear if the virus was contracted aboard the ship or after disembarkation, but MSC Musica, which had been moored at the Port of Santos, was placed under quarantine as a preventative measure, with the standard 14 days of quarantine beginning on the day the crew member had disembarked.
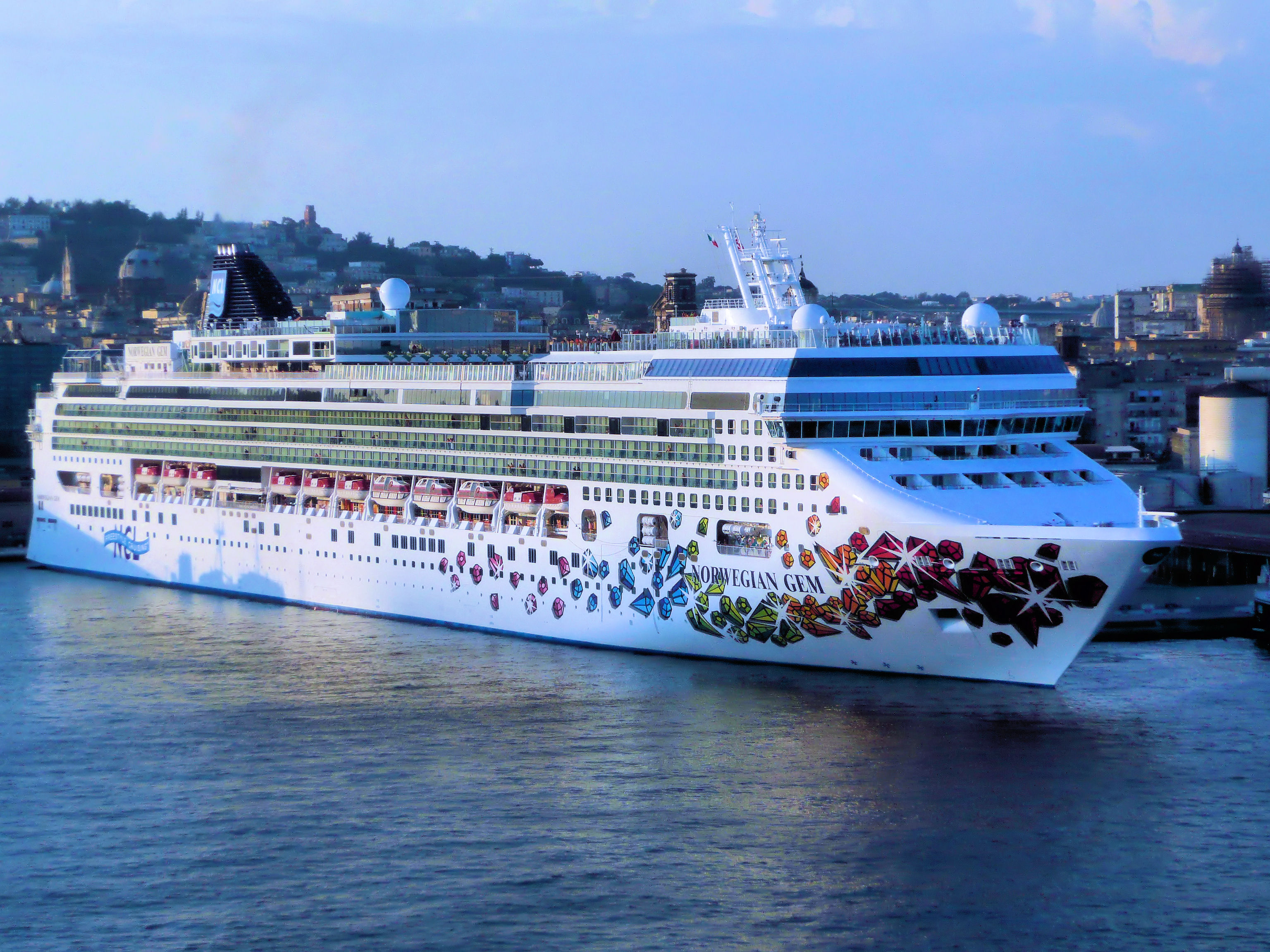
- Norwegian Gem in 2008
  Norwegian Gem:
  - On 13 April 2020, a 56-year-old Filipino male crew member died aboard Norwegian Gem. The crew member had been treated for pneumonia and tachycardia arrhythmia. Norwegian Cruise Line (NCL) claimed they did not believe he was infected with the virus, but appeared to have not offered any explanation as to why an autopsy was not performed, or why he was not tested for the virus. His body was offloaded at Miami by people in hazmat suits.
  - On 23 April, NCL sent a letter to the crew members aboard stating that another crew member, who was on the cruise ship between 31 March 2020 and 14 April, had tested positive for the virus. Notably, this letter was not sent to crew members who were no longer on the ship. (Note: It has been conjectured that this was because those crew members would have been entitled to certain benefits had they been infected with the virus while on board.)
  - On the morning of 30 April, the senior doctor on Norwegian Gem was found dead in his cabin. NCL claimed that he died of a heart attack in his sleep, though crew members stated that he was being treated for pneumonia and had not been tested for the virus. Also, according to crew members, a nurse who had worked closely with the doctor had reportedly tested positive for the virus after being removed from the ship. There was concern among crew members that NCL had been hiding evidence of the virus on board Norwegian Gem, which may become an issue if NCL carries out plans to combine crews from different ships together before sailing them back home.

=== No currently suspected cases ===
- AIDAaura: The German cruise ship AIDAaura, with about 1,200 people on board, was held on 3 March 2020 in the harbour of Haugesund, Norway, while two asymptomatic German passengers were tested who had been in contact with a person who subsequently developed COVID-19; their test results were negative.
- AIDAblu: On 18 May 2020, a male Filipino crew member of AIDAblu was found dead in his cabin. He had worked in the ship's galley department. The ship was docked in Hamburg at the time. The crew member was not suspected to have died of COVID-19. During the previous week, 188 crew members of AIDAblu had been successfully repatriated from Germany to the Philippines, though it is unclear why the deceased was not among them. In addition, many employees working for AIDA Cruises have praised the company for their transparency and honesty since the start of the pandemic, as well as the care that their managers have shown for their mental health.
- AIDAmira: Six passengers on the ship were isolated in the middle of March, after flying on a plane with a sailor who later tested positive with the virus. More than 1,700 were trapped on the cruise ship, docked at Cape Town, South Africa, pending test results. By 2020.03.19, all tests returned negative, and passengers were allowed to disembark.
- Anthem of the Seas: On 7 February 2020, the ship was quarantined because a passenger from the 27 January 2020 sailing had travelled through mainland China. The CDC reported on 8 February 2020 that the guest tested negative, and the ship was cleared to sail on 10 February 2020. All 5,000 passengers due to sail on 7 February had to find their own arrangements for lodging and ended up sailing to Bermuda for four days instead of the Bahamas for eight.
- Carnival Breeze: On 9 May 2020, it was reported that a 29-year-old Hungarian crew member aboard Carnival Breeze had been found dead in his cabin, reportedly due to suicide. He was an assistant shore excursion manager, and was last seen with someone on 6 May. A crew member blamed depression due to long periods of isolation aboard the ship, while others were shocked because things seemed normal with the crew member. At the time, Carnival Breeze was crossing the Atlantic Ocean heading toward Southampton, England, to repatriate its European crew members.
- Carnival Panorama: On 7 March 2020, the Centers for Disease Control and Prevention (CDC) halted passengers disembarking from the cruise ship Carnival Panorama docked at Long Beach Cruise Terminal in California when a female passenger was reported to be sick. The sick passenger was transported to a hospital to be tested, and all passengers were held on board the ship pending test results. The test came back negative late that evening, and disembarkation was scheduled to resume the next morning. Carnival Panorama was returning from a trip to Mexico with scheduled stops at Cabo San Lucas, Mazatlán and Puerto Vallarta, which were also scheduled stops for Grand Princess during the previous month.
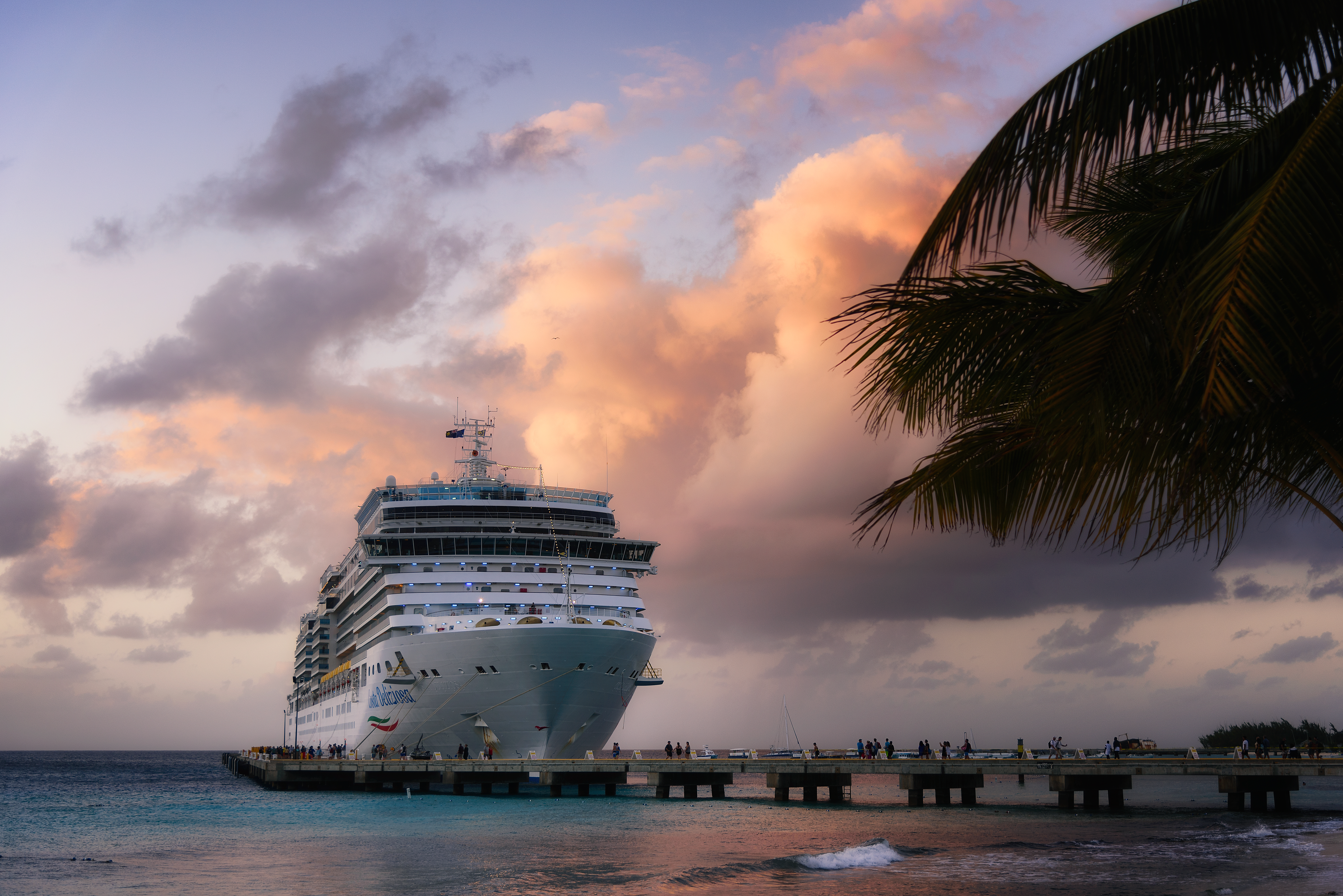
- Costa Deliziosa in 2018
  Costa Deliziosa: This ship carried 1830 guests and 899 crew and had made a technical call in Muscat, Oman, in early April for food and provisions. The company was seeking a port that would allow all of its passengers to disembark. Finally, on 18 April, an announcement stated that although French authorities had rejected their docking request, some of the passengers would be disembarking in Barcelona, Spain, and the remaining passengers in Genoa, Italy, during that week. As of that time, no cases of COVID-19 had been reported to authorities. On 20 April 2020, Costa Deliziosa docked at Barcelona as planned, letting off some of its passengers, including 168 Spanish nationals. It then headed off to Genoa, with 1519 passengers and 898 crew members aboard, (Note: There are conflicting reports on the number of passengers and crew members that headed for Genoa.) where it docked on 2020.04.22. (Note: It was scheduled to dock on 2020.04.21, but a storm prevented it from doing so.) This ship is likely to be the penultimate cruise ship to unload all its passengers during the pandemic, with Artania being the only ship left with passengers on board at the time Costa Deliziosa docked.
- Costa Fortuna: The Italian cruise ship Costa Fortuna attempted to dock at Phuket, Thailand, on 6 March 2020, but was denied by Thai officials because it was carrying passengers who had left Italy within the past two weeks. On 7 March, the ship attempted to dock at Penang in northern Malaysia, but was denied pursuant to a complete ban on cruise ships. The vessel docked in Singapore on 10 March and the passengers disembarked, with some being bused directly to the airport. There were no confirmed cases of COVID-19 aboard the ship.
- Costa neoRomantica: On 26 March 2020, the ship with no passengers on board, previously quarantined at Nagasaki, Japan, anchored at the roadstead of Vladivostok, Russia, to refresh the ship with water, fuel, and food. However, it was denied entrance as the Russian sanitary officials stipulated the dock workers to be quarantined for 14 days. No COVID-19 cases on board were reported.
- Costa Serena: Fifteen passengers aboard Costa Serena on 24 January were suspected to have SARS-CoV-2. The ship arrived at its destination, Tianjin, China, on 25 January. Quarantine officials boarded the ship to screen all passengers and crew member, and found 17 people with fevers. All tests returned negative later that day, and everyone was ordered to disembark and have their photographs and temperatures taken as an additional precaution.
- Costa Smeralda: In January, Costa Smeralda and her 6,000 passengers were quarantined at the port of Civitavecchia in Rome, Italy, following two suspected cases. A spokesperson from Costa Cruises stated that a 54-year-old woman aboard the ship had developed a fever and that she and her husband were both being tested. They were found to be uninfected, and passengers were allowed to go on shore the next day.
- Emerald Princess: Reports in May 2020 indicated that there had been no confirmed COVID-19 cases on this vessel which was docked in Florida as of 9 May 2020. Some days earlier, it had been denied permission to dock at Nassau, but by that time, contained only crew members. Passengers had been allowed to disembark previously. On 9 May, the 123 Canadian and American crew members were allowed to disembark at Port Everglades, although others remained on board.
- Europa: The ship docked in Puerto Vallarta, Mexico. The government announced on 25 March that it would receive cruise ships "for humanitarian reasons," but that passengers would be individually "fumigated" before being taken directly to airports to be returned to their home countries. The protocol would apply to Europa and other ships in Mexican waters.
- Grandeur of the Seas: On 12 March 2020, Grandeur of the Seas was denied a request to berth at the Austin "Babe" Monsanto Marine Terminal in the United States Virgin Islands because a crew member had travelled to Japan within the previous two weeks, even though no confirmed cases of coronavirus were on board. The ship, however, was eventually allowed to return to transport a seriously injured passenger to a hospital for treatment.
- Jewel of the Seas:
  - On 2020.03.11, two passengers aboard Jewel of the Seas were experiencing respiratory illnesses while the ship was docked at the Dubai Cruise Terminal. (Note: Both passengers were diagnosed with symptoms unrelated to the coronavirus.) After the ship was placed in quarantine, test results for the two sick passengers returned negative, and the ship was given the all clear. (Note: Business Insider reported that the two passengers had tested positive, while inexplicably linking to an article that said they had tested negative.) However, because many ports had begun to close, Jewel of the Seas ended up staying at Dubai for the duration of the cruise, and Royal Caribbean gave the passengers full refunds and allowed them to use the ship as a hotel.
  - On 2020.04.29, a 27-year-old male Polish electrician of Jewel of the Seas jumped overboard from deck 12 while the ship was anchored near Corfu, Greece. His absence was only realised over two days later. The Hellenic Coast Guard conducted a large search operation but was unsuccessful.
- Maasdam: 842 guests and 542 crew members from Holland America Line's Maasdam were not allowed to disembark in Honolulu on 19 March 2020.
- Marco Polo: Kenyan authorities screened passengers on Marco Polo for coronavirus when the cruise ship docked at Mombasa on 13 February 2020.
- Mariner of the Seas: On 10 May 2020, a male Chinese crew member of Mariner of the Seas was found dead aboard the ship. (Note: Schiffe und Kreuzfahrten reported that Cruise Law News had stated that the crew member was found dead in his cabin, although the article Cruise Law News published appeared to not include this detail.) The ship is owned by Royal Caribbean Cruises, which, according to the Miami Herald, has refused to repatriate many crew members due to the associated costs, with many crew members turning to desperate measures, such as hunger strikes, as a result.
- MSC Meraviglia: On 26 February, Mexican authorities granted permission for MSC Meraviglia, registered in Malta, to dock in Cozumel, Quintana Roo, because she carried a passenger presumed to be infected with the coronavirus. The ship was previously denied access to ports in Jamaica and the Cayman Islands. Two cases of common seasonal flu were found.
- Norwegian Jewel: On 17 March 2020, the cruise ship was stranded in the middle of the Pacific Ocean, after being denied entry into Papeete, French Polynesia, and Lautoka, Fiji, due to fears of possible infection. On 19 March the 1,700 passengers were prevented from disembarking in Honolulu, Hawaii. On 23 March, the passengers were allowed to disembark in Honolulu because the ship was experiencing mechanical problems. Passengers were able to catch chartered flights to return to their home locations. There were no confirmed cases of COVID-19 found aboard the ship. Approximately 1,000 crew members remained on the ship as of 27 March 2020. On 10 April 47 Filipino crew members arrived in Manila.
- Pacific Princess: Though there have been no confirmed cases on board, the ship was rejected from docking at numerous destinations including Bali, Singapore, Phuket, Thailand, and Sri Lanka. The ship was as at 20 March 2020 en route to an uncertain future for Fremantle, Australia. Most passengers were allowed to disembark in Australia on 21 March; four were allowed to disembark in Honolulu on 13 April 2020. The last remaining passengers disembarked when the ship returned to Los Angeles on 20 April.
- Regal Princess:
  - On 7 March, two crew members of Regal Princess were tested and the docking of the ship at Port Everglades in Fort Lauderdale, Florida, US, was delayed for about a day while waiting for test results. The tests were negative, and the crew did not have respiratory complications, so the ship was allowed to dock.
  - On 10 May 2020, a 39-year-old female Ukrainian crew member of Regal Princess died after going overboard from the ship while it was docked in Rotterdam. One source stated that she had committed suicide, and that she had been scheduled to be repatriated on a charter flight which was subsequently cancelled. She was reportedly distraught and last seen crying aboard the ship.
- Royal Princess: As a crew member from Grand Princess had transferred to Royal Princess fifteen days earlier, the CDC issued a "no-sail order" for Royal Princess on 8 March 2020, prompting Princess Cruises to cancel the ship's seven-day cruise to Mexico before it departed Los Angeles.
- Scarlet Lady: On 22 May 2020, Cruise Law News reported that a male Filipino crew member of Scarlet Lady had been found dead in his cabin. Colleagues believe he may have committed suicide, and the United States Coast Guard stated that the 32-year-old had died from "apparent self-harm". The crew member had worked as a hotel utility employee. The ship had been located off the coast of Florida at the time, and sailed into PortMiami later that day, where police boarded the ship to conduct an investigation and the body was disembarked. Scarlet Lady is Virgin Voyages' inaugural ship, and Virgin Voyages had announced the previous day that its first sailing would be postponed to 16 October 2020. (Note: The inaugural season had already been postponed once before.) A spokesperson for Virgin Voyages stated that the crew member was not waiting to be repatriated.
- Vasco da Gama:
  - The cruise ship docked in Fremantle in late March 2020. Almost 100 New Zealand passengers were flown from Perth on 29 March and arrived in Auckland on 30 March. As of 31 March, about 200 West Australian passengers were to be ferried to Rottnest Island, which had been converted to a quarantine zone. Another 600 Australians were to be taken to Perth hotels for 14 days of quarantine.
  - On 19 May, a male Indonesian crew member of Vasco da Gama fell from deck 12 of the ship while it was docked at the Port of Tilbury, London's main port, and landed on a cargo container that was placed on the dock next to the ship. One source reported that he died from the fall, while another reported that he was seriously injured but there was no confirmation that he had died, and a third reported that he was being treated at a hospital. The crew member worked as a storekeeper in the ship's supply area. Vasco da Gama had been docked at Tilbury since 1 May, after having repatriated passengers to Australia. Crew members have complained that they have not been paid and are frustrated with Cruise & Maritime Voyages. (Note: For example, one crew member complained that they have not been paid for work since April; that they have been locked up for two months, with neither alcohol nor cigarettes, only water and juice; and that Wi-Fi has only been available starting at midnight.)

== Docking restrictions ==
World Dream was turned away from Taiwan on 4 February. Zaandam was turned away from Chile on 14 March, then was delayed passage through the Panama Canal and had to negotiate to disembark at Port Everglades, United States.

- Australia:
  - Australia banned cruise ships arriving from foreign ports from 15 March 2020, and on 27 March directed all foreign-flagged ships to leave the country. However the 2,700 passengers offloaded at Sydney on 19 March by the Australian-based Ruby Princess had caused over 10% of all COVID-19 cases across that country by 10 April, and some ship operators challenged the Australian government's order in court.
  - On 20 May 2020, the Minister for Health extended the ban on cruise ships arriving from foreign ports by another three months, to 17 September 2020.
- Canada:
  - Canada blocked all ships carrying more than 500 people from docking in Canada from 13 March to 1 July 2020.
  - On 29 May 2020, the Minister of Transport updated the restriction by announcing that "[c]ruise ships with overnight accommodations allowed to carry more than 100 persons" would not be allowed to operate in Canadian waters until 31 October 2020. This has since been extended through 28 February 2022.
- New Zealand: New Zealand banned all cruise ships from entering New Zealand from 14 March 2020 to at least 30 June, with ships already in New Zealand waters allowed to complete their itinerary.
- Seychelles: The government of Seychelles put all authorisations for cruise ships on hold until at least 2022.
- Singapore: Singapore ceased port calls for all cruise ships from 13 March 2020 to 23 June 2022, replaced by "cruises to nowhere".
- United States: The United States Coast Guard declared that foreign-flagged vessels carrying more than 50 people should not dock in Florida, Georgia, South Carolina, and Puerto Rico from 29 March, and instead should prepare to treat any sick passengers and crew on board and try to medically evacuate the very sick to their home countries.
  - Under the Passenger Vessel Services Act of 1886, only vessels that are U.S.-built, owned, and documented may transport passengers between U.S. ports. The current Canadian ban effectively prohibited coastal cruises by foreign-flagged vessels, such as between Seattle and Alaska (which must perform a stopover at a Canadian port, such as Victoria, British Columbia, to comply with the Act). The Alaska Tourism Recovery Act was introduced by Alaska congressman Don Young to propose an exception to cover this situation, and passed in May 2021. This exception will lapse after 28 February 2022.

== Government travel advisories ==
- Germany: The crisis management team of the German federal government said on 4 March 2020, following several actual and suspected outbreaks on cruise ships, "The Federal Foreign Office has included in its travel advice that there is an increased risk of quarantine on cruise ships."
- New Zealand: New Zealand advised against all nonessential travel, including on cruise ships.
- United Kingdom:
  - On 12 March 2020, the Foreign & Commonwealth Office (FCO) advised British nationals that either had pre-existing health conditions or were at least 70 years old against travelling on cruise ships.
  - On 9 July 2020, the FCO advised against travelling on cruise ships.
- United States: The Centers for Disease Control and Prevention remarks that "[o]utbreaks of COVID-19 on cruise ships pose a risk for rapid spread of disease beyond the voyage" and that "[a]ggressive efforts are required to contain spread". They recommend that "cruise ship travelers with no symptoms or mild symptoms disembark as quickly and safely as possible at US ports of entry", disallowing the usage of "[c]ommercial flights and public transportation", and requiring the usage of "chartered or private transportation" instead. A US Coast Guard report on 4 April 2020 stated that "there are 114 cruise ships, carrying 93,000 crew members, either in or near U.S. ports and waters. ... Another 41 cruise ships, with 41,000 crew members, are underway and close to the U.S".

== International rules proposal ==
In response to the delayed action over the coronavirus outbreak aboard Diamond Princess and the confusion over the outbreak aboard Costa Atlantica, Japan has budgeted about 60 million JPY for research into developing a set of international rules to govern outbreaks of infectious diseases aboard cruise ships. Since countries would be dissuaded from allowing ships with outbreaks on board from docking if they were entirely responsible for a ship docking in their ports, and jurisdiction is unclear when a ship docks in a country other than its flag state, (Note: This may be further complicated when the flag state refuses to take any appropriate action, or when a ship is merely flying a flag of convenience, with the owners of the ship belonging to a country other than the flag state.) the Japanese government believed that a set of rules should be drafted to address such issues. The government hoped to have the rules adopted by other countries as well as international bodies such as the International Maritime Organization and the World Health Organization.

== Cruise line suspensions ==
On 11 March 2020, Viking Cruises suspended operations for its 79-vessel fleet until the end of April, cancelling all ocean and river cruises, after it was revealed that a passenger on a cruise in Cambodia had been exposed to the virus while in transit via plane, placing at least 28 other passengers in quarantine.

Similarly, on 12 March, Princess Cruises, owner of virus-stricken ships Diamond Princess and Grand Princess, suspended operations for all future cruises on its 18-ship fleet for 60 days.

All cruise lines suspended departures from the United States on 14 March.

On 30 June 2020, Celestyal Cruises announced that it was voluntarily extending its suspension of all cruise operations until 6 March 2021.

== Crew strandings and repatriations ==
After disembarking passengers, many cruise ships remained docked or at sea near ports with crew members still aboard, in some cases unpaid though with free room and board. Crew members are generally citizens of many different countries, aside from those where the ship is registered, based, or temporarily stopped. Especially with pandemic-related travel restrictions and concerns about onboard outbreaks, crew members could not simply disembark and fly home. After some negotiations, most cruise companies made special arrangements to allow crew members to take charter flights to their home countries. In some cases, the ships themselves were used to transport crew members to home countries directly. According to the Miami Herald, Royal Caribbean has been slower than other companies to make these arrangements; in the meantime two crew members have died after jumping overboard, and some crew on Navigator of the Seas have gone on hunger strike demanding to be released. The government of Grenada complained that cruise companies that promised to pay for on-shore quarantines failed to do so, and some were concerned about crew members being released into Haiti from Royal Caribbean ships without testing or on-shore quarantine.

=== Suspected suicides or suicide attempts ===
§	Date (Note: Date of announcement of death in italics if actual date of death was not reported or unknown)	Ship	Owner	Notes	Ref.
§	2020.04.29	Jewel of the Seas	Royal Caribbean Cruises (Royal Caribbean International)		
§	2020.05.09	Carnival Breeze	Carnival Corporation & plc (Carnival Cruise Line)		
§	2020.05.10	Regal Princess	Carnival Corporation & plc (Princess Cruises)		
§	2020.05.10	Mariner of the Seas	Royal Caribbean Cruises (Royal Caribbean International)		
§	2020.05.18	AIDAblu	Carnival Corporation & plc (AIDA Cruises)		
§	2020.05.22	Scarlet Lady	Virgin Voyages		
	2020.06.09	Harmony of the Seas	Royal Caribbean Cruises (Royal Caribbean International)		

=== Incidents ===
- Majesty of the Seas: On 15 May 2020, about 400 crew members protested because their scheduled repatriation date had been rescheduled for a fifth time. (Note: The previous five repatriation dates were 26 April 28 April, 4 May 14 May, and 18 May 2020.) Crew members had been stuck aboard the ship for at least 60 days. One sign erected by the protesters read "How many more suicides do you need?!", (Note: Sign was in all capital letters.) referring to the deaths of a Polish engineer aboard Jewel of the Seas and a Chinese assistant waiter aboard Mariner of the Seas. Another read "Do you sleep well M. Bailey?!", referring to Royal Caribbean International CEO Michael Bayley, who received around US$25,000,000 in compensation over the past four years, while a spokesperson for the CDC had stated that cruise line officials had complained that arranging private transportation for the crew was "too expensive".

== Hazard controls ==
According to the U.S. Centers for Disease Control and Prevention, proper hazard controls for cruise ships and other commercial vessels include postponing travel when sick, and self-isolating and informing the onboard medical center immediately if one develops a fever or other symptoms while on board. Ideally, medical follow-up should occur in the isolated person's cabin.

A new regulation issued by the CDC on 6 April 2020 stated that passengers on cruise ships would not be able to travel home on commercial flights. They were to travel only by "charter flights and private transportation".

== Resuming cruise operations ==
- Norwegian cruise line Hurtigruten AS was the first ocean cruise line in the world to resume cruise operations, with Otto Sverdrup sailing from Bergen to Kirkenes on 16 June 2020. The first large outbreak of coronavirus on a cruise ship after the resumption of cruise operations was also aboard a Hurtigruten ship, with 36 people that were aboard Hurtigruten's Roald Amundsen testing positive after docking at Tromsø as of 1 August 2020.
- Compagnie du Ponant resumed cruise operations on 18 July 2020 with a French Polynesian cruise for the local market. Its first cruise for international travellers set sail on 30 July, and was abruptly halted on 1 August when one of the passengers aboard Paul Gauguin tested positive for the virus.
- TUI Cruises resumed cruise operations with the departure of Mein Schiff 2 from Hamburg on 24 July 2020 for a three-day roundtrip voyage in the North Sea, making no intermediate stops. About 1200 passengers were aboard, although TUI Cruises had set a quota of 1740, and the ship's capacity was around 2900. Passengers were required to fill in a health questionnaire prior to boarding, and were not allowed to serve themselves from the buffet table. Another cruise aboard Mein Schiff 1 was cancelled, ostensibly because a crew could not be assembled in time due to coronavirus travel restrictions. TUI Cruises later admitted that it was because five crew members of Mein Schiff 1 had tested positive.
- A cruise ship sailed in November 2020 from and to Singapore on a three-day roundtrip voyage in the Malacca Strait, making no intermediate stops. On 9 December it was reported that an 83-year-old had been diagnosed with COVID-19, which led to that "cruise to nowhere" being cut short. After retesting the original sample, and taking a second sample, the case appeared to be a false positive.
- Spain announced on 29 May 2021 that it would allow cruise ships dock in its ports beginning on 7 June, hoping to salvage the hard-hit tourist industry and considering the low incidence of the virus and the high level of COVID-19 vaccination amongst tourists and in the country itself.

== Financial fallout ==
Cruising experienced a significant decline—down to levels not seen in thirty years.

Cruise line stock fell sharply on 27 March 2020 when the US$2 trillion relief package passed by the U.S. Congress and signed by President Trump excluded companies that are not "organized" under United States law. Carnival Corporation & plc is registered in Panama, England and Wales; Royal Caribbean International is chartered in Liberia, and Norwegian Cruise Line Holdings is domiciled in Bermuda. Senator Sheldon Whitehouse, (D-RI), tweeted: "The giant cruise companies incorporate overseas to dodge US taxes, flag vessels overseas to avoid US taxes and laws, and pollute without offset. Why should we bail them out?" Senator Josh Hawley (R-MO) tweeted that cruise lines should register and pay taxes in the United States if they expect a financial bailout. U.S-based employees and American-owned passenger ships will still be eligible for financial assistance. Carnival Cruise Line stock fell 75% between 1 January and 31 March 2020 and dividend payments to shareholders were suspended. On 13 March the company drew down its $3 billion revolving credit line and Moody's and S&P Global downgraded Carnival's debt rating. On 31 March Carnival announced plans to issue $1.25 billion in stock and $4.75 billion in notes due in 2023. The Cruise Lines International Association, a cruise line trade association, claims that the cruise industry supports 400,000 jobs in the United States.

A 24 September 2020 report by U.S. Federal Maritime Commissioner Louis E. Sola said Florida had lost $3.2 billion in economic activity and 49,500 local jobs that pay $2.3 billion in wages, as a result of the suspension of cruising in response to the COVID-19 pandemic.

== Average age of cruise passengers ==
A report from Cruise Lines International Association from 2019 states the average age of cruise passengers is 46.9 years, while the largest age bracket is 60–69 years (19%) followed by 50–59 years (18%). Research from 2001 studying the epidemiology of passenger mortalities on two cruise ships, indicated a median age of 65 years of cruise participants. It also stated, that between April 1995 to April 2001 "there was an average of one death every six months per ship", with an average of 800 passengers on each ship.

== See also ==
- COVID-19 pandemic on naval ships
- COVID-19 pandemic on USS Theodore Roosevelt
- COVID-19 pandemic in North America
- COVID-19 pandemic in Oceania
