= Azamara Pursuit =

Cruise ship

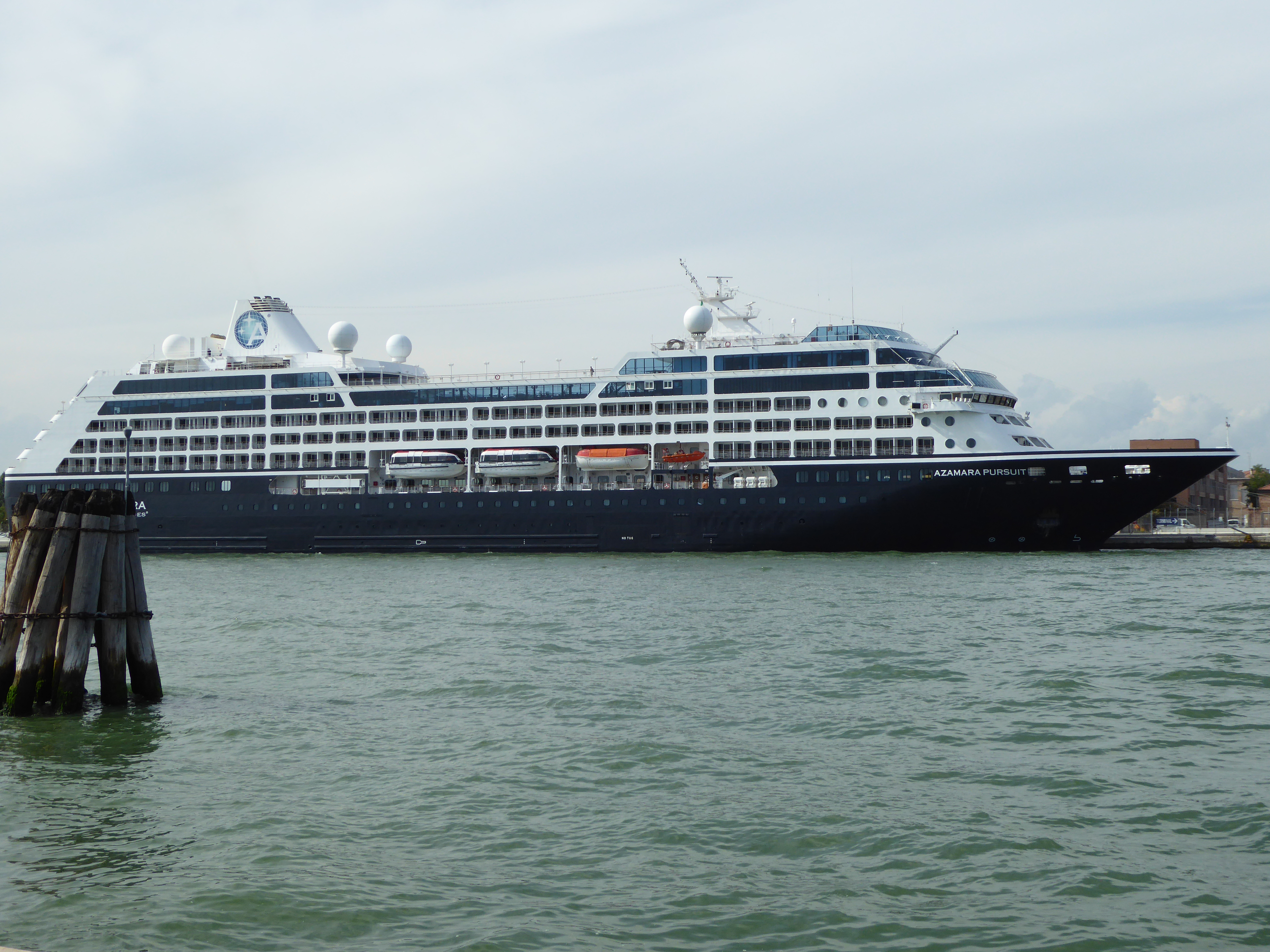

History
- Name: R Eight (2001–2003); Minerva II (2003–2007); Royal Princess (2007–2011); Adonia (2011–2018); Azamara Pursuit (2018–present)
- Owner: Renaissance Cruises (2001); Cruiseinvest Eight SA (2001–2003); Octavian Shipping Ltd (2003–2006); Carnival Corporation & plc (2006–2018); Royal Caribbean Cruises Ltd. (2018–2021); Sycamore Partners (2021–present)
- Operator: Renaissance Cruises (2001); (laid up 2001–2003); Swan Hellenic (2003–2007); Princess Cruises (2007–2011); P&O Cruises (2011–2016); Fathom (2016–2017); P&O Cruises (2017–2018); Azamara (2018–present)
- Port of registry: Monrovia, Liberia (2001); Majuro, Marshall Islands (2001–2007); Hamilton, Bermuda (2007–2018); Valletta, Malta (2018–present)
- Builder: Chantiers de l'Atlantique; St. Nazaire, France
- Cost: GB£150 million
- Yard number: Z31
- Laid down: 10 April 2000
- Launched: 16 September 2000
- Christened: 2001
- Completed: 16 February 2001
- Acquired: 1 February 2001
- In service: 2001
- Identification: Call sign: 9HA4800; IMO number: 9210220; MMSI number: 248762000

General characteristics (as Adonia)
- Class & type: R-class cruise ship
- Tonnage: 30,277 GT; 2,700t DWT
- Displacement: 15,100 t
- Length: 180.45 m (592 ft 0 in)
- Beam: 25.46 m (83 ft 6 in)
- Draught: Max. Draft 5.95 m (19 ft 6 in)
- Decks: 12 (9 passenger accessible)
- Installed power: 4 × Wärtsilä 12V32; 13,500 kW (18,100 hp) (combined)
- Propulsion: Two propellers
- Speed: 18 knots (33 km/h; 21 mph)
- Capacity: 777 passengers (max. capacity)
- Crew: 380 crew

Azamara Pursuit (previously R Eight, Minerva II, Royal Princess and Adonia) is a cruise ship operating for Azamara Club Cruises. The ship was built by Chantiers de l'Atlantique at their shipyard in St. Nazaire, France in 2001.

Azamara Pursuit is a sister ship of Azamara Journey and Azamara Quest, as well as Pacific Princess of Princess Cruises, and Regatta, Nautica, Insignia and Sirena of Oceania Cruises. She previously sailed for Renaissance Cruises, Swan Hellenic, Princess Cruises, P&O Cruises and Fathom.

Azamara acquired the ship in 2017, renamed the vessel the Azamara Pursuit in March 2018 and began operating the ship in August 2018 after an extensive refit.

== Service history ==
=== R Eight ===
Originally built as the last of eight R-class ships for Renaissance Cruises, Azamara Pursuit was first known as R Eight, and entered service in 2001. After Renaissance ceased operations and filed for bankruptcy in late 2001, the vessel was seized by creditors and laid up in Marseille, France.

=== Minerva II ===
In 2003, the vessel re-entered operation, this time as the sole cruise ship in Swan Hellenic's fleet. The vessel was named Minerva II, after both the Roman goddess and the company's previous vessel, Minerva.

=== Royal Princess ===
On 7 April 2007, Minerva II completed her final voyage with Swan Hellenic and was transferred by the parent company, Carnival Corporation & plc, to Princess Cruises. She was renamed Royal Princess and debuted for Princess on her maiden voyage on 19 April 2007. Her christening ceremony was on 14 June 2007 in Portofino, with Lorraine Arzt performing the honors.

On 18 June 2009, a major fire broke out in her engine room. Royal Princess was on a 12-day Holy Land voyage and just left Port Said, Egypt. A little while later a serious fire broke out in her engine room, disabling the ship. She waited to dock in Port Said for an assessment of the damage.

=== Adonia ===
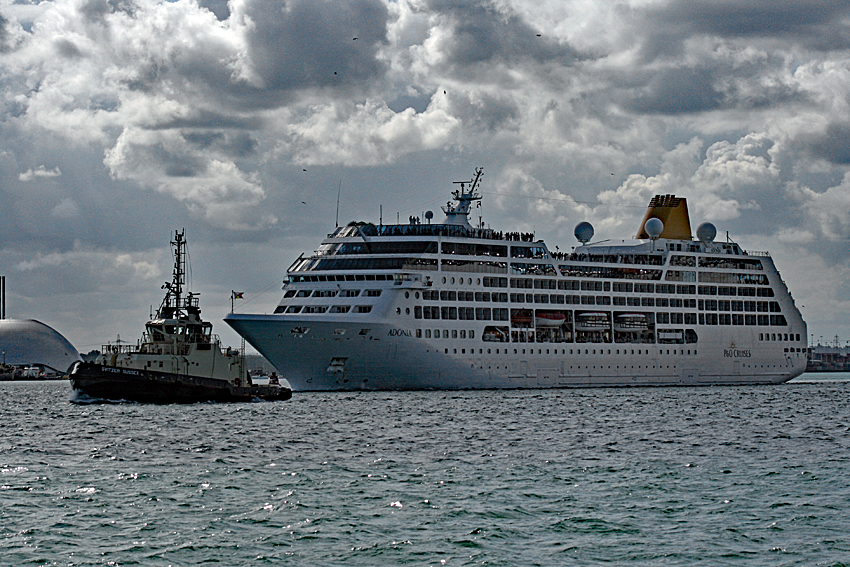
Adonia departing from Southampton, 2011

In 2010, it was announced that Royal Princess was to transfer to the P&O Cruises fleet. The ship entered service with the company on 21 May 2011, and was renamed Adonia. She was the second P&O ship to be named Adonia, succeeding Sea Princess.

On 18 March 2013, two of the ship's passengers were shot in Bridgetown, Barbados, on her 2013 world cruise. P&O Cruises confirmed two of its passengers from the Adonia, which left Southampton on 8 January, believed to be a man in his 70s and a woman in her 50s, were taken to hospital after the incident. The ship's staff and medical team also provided support.

After completing a major refit in 2016, Adonia was reassigned within the Carnival Corporation, and became the first ship for a new brand called "Fathom", focusing on the growing number of people who wanted to work alongside local communities as part of their travel experience in areas such as education, the environment and economic development. She sailed out of Miami to the Dominican Republic and Cuba on an alternating weekly basis. While in the Dominican Republic and Cuba, passengers had the opportunity to work on programs designed to make a positive social impact on the communities they visited.

On 2 May 2016, Adonia docked in the port of Havana, the first port of her Cuban itinerary for Fathom. It marked the first time in over 50 years that a U.S. cruise line has sailed from the U.S. to Cuba. It was also the first time in decades that Cuban-born individuals were able to travel by sea to or from Cuba. An outbreak of gastro-intestinal illnesses occurred on the initial voyage, striking 14 passengers.

In November 2016, Carnival announced that Fathom would discontinue operations in June 2017. The Adonia returned to Carnival's P&O Cruises fleet at that time.

==== Farewell Voyage ====
On 26 September 2017 P&O announced that Adonia would be retired in March 2018 with the last cruise leaving Barbados on 23 February and ending in Barbados on 9 March 2018. She arrived at the Grand Bahama Shipyard on 13 March 2018 and was officially handed over to Azamara the following day. She completed a short drydocking in Grand Bahama (which included hull inspections, along with changing her name and registry) before sailing for Belfast's Harland and Wolff shipyard.

=== Azamara Pursuit ===
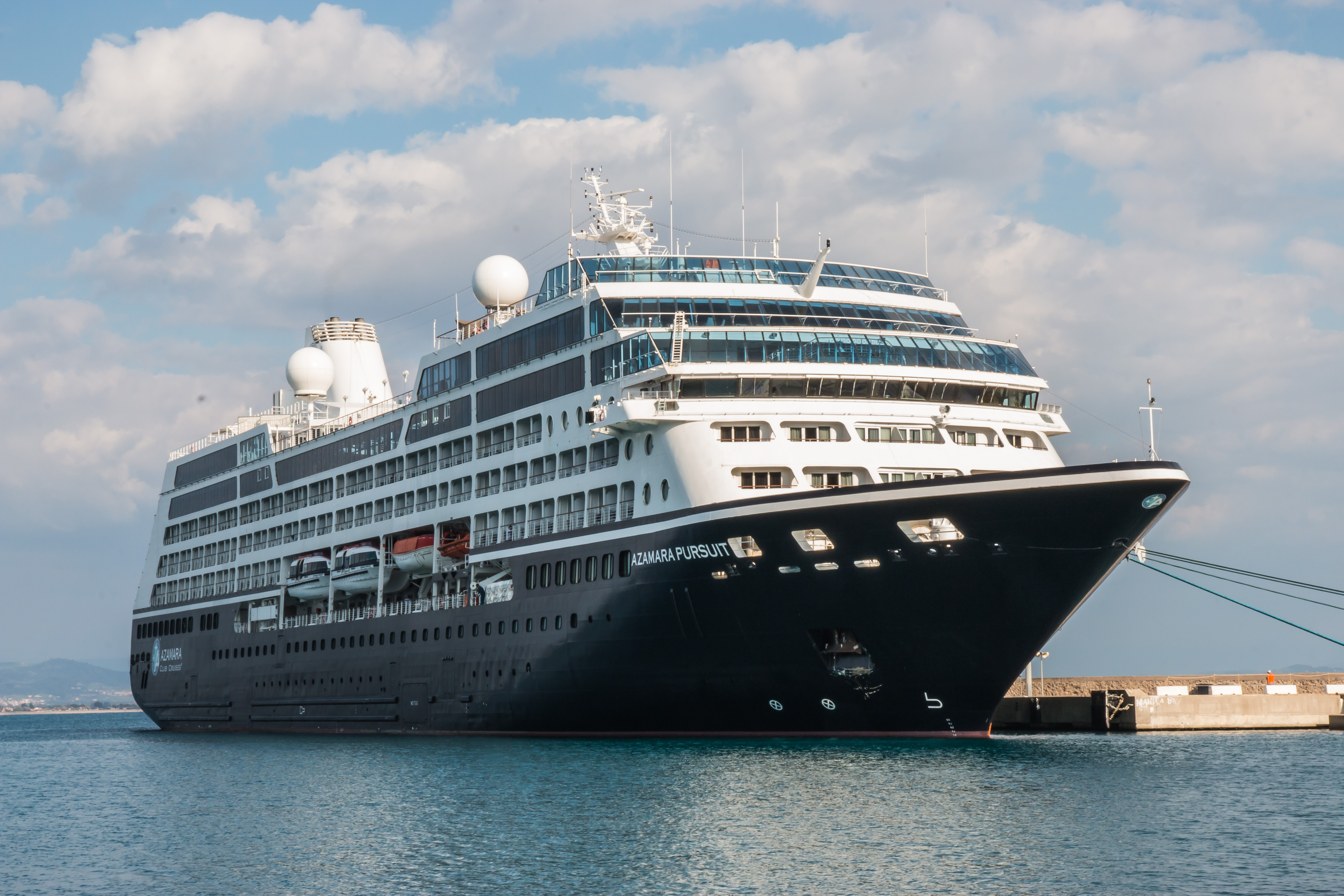
Azamara Pursuit at Greek Islands in October 2018.

Her first cruise under Azamara Club Cruises took place on 13 August 2018, when she joined two other R-Class vessels in the fleet, Azamara Journey and Azamara Quest. Her christening ceremony happened in Southampton on 28 August 2018, where she was officially named by Lucy Huxley and Ellen Asmodeo-Giglio, two travel industry executives. Before entering service, the ship underwent a substantial refit at Harland and Wolff shipyard in Belfast, bringing her decor and image into line with Azamara's other ships.

== Incidents ==
=== Coronavirus Pandemic ===
On 2 March 2020, the ship left Buenos Aires, Argentina, on a cruise that was scheduled to end in Lima, Peru, on 23 March. Carrying 675 passengers and 389 crew members, it left Ushuaia, Argentina, on 8 March 2020. It was then denied landing at Puerto Chacabuco, Chile, after Chilean authorities said that it was carrying suspected cases of the coronavirus. However, the company said that it had confirmed that there were no positive coronavirus cases on board. From Chile, the ship began sailing to Miami, via the Panama Canal, with all passengers and crew still on board. By 24 March, it was off the coast of Ecuador, and finally arrived in Miami on 29 March; no passengers had become ill from the coronavirus. After this voyage, due to the worldwide COVID-19 pandemic, further sailings were suspended on nearly all cruises worldwide.

In June 2020, the ship was laid up at King George V Dock, Glasgow to wait out the coronavirus pandemic alongside Azamara Journey and Azamara Quest. As of 12 January 2021, a report indicated that Azamara was suspending all sailings "through April 30". Azamara Pursuit was the second to leave the dock, departing on 7 August 2021, shortly followed by Journey.
