= Azamara Quest =

Cruise ship

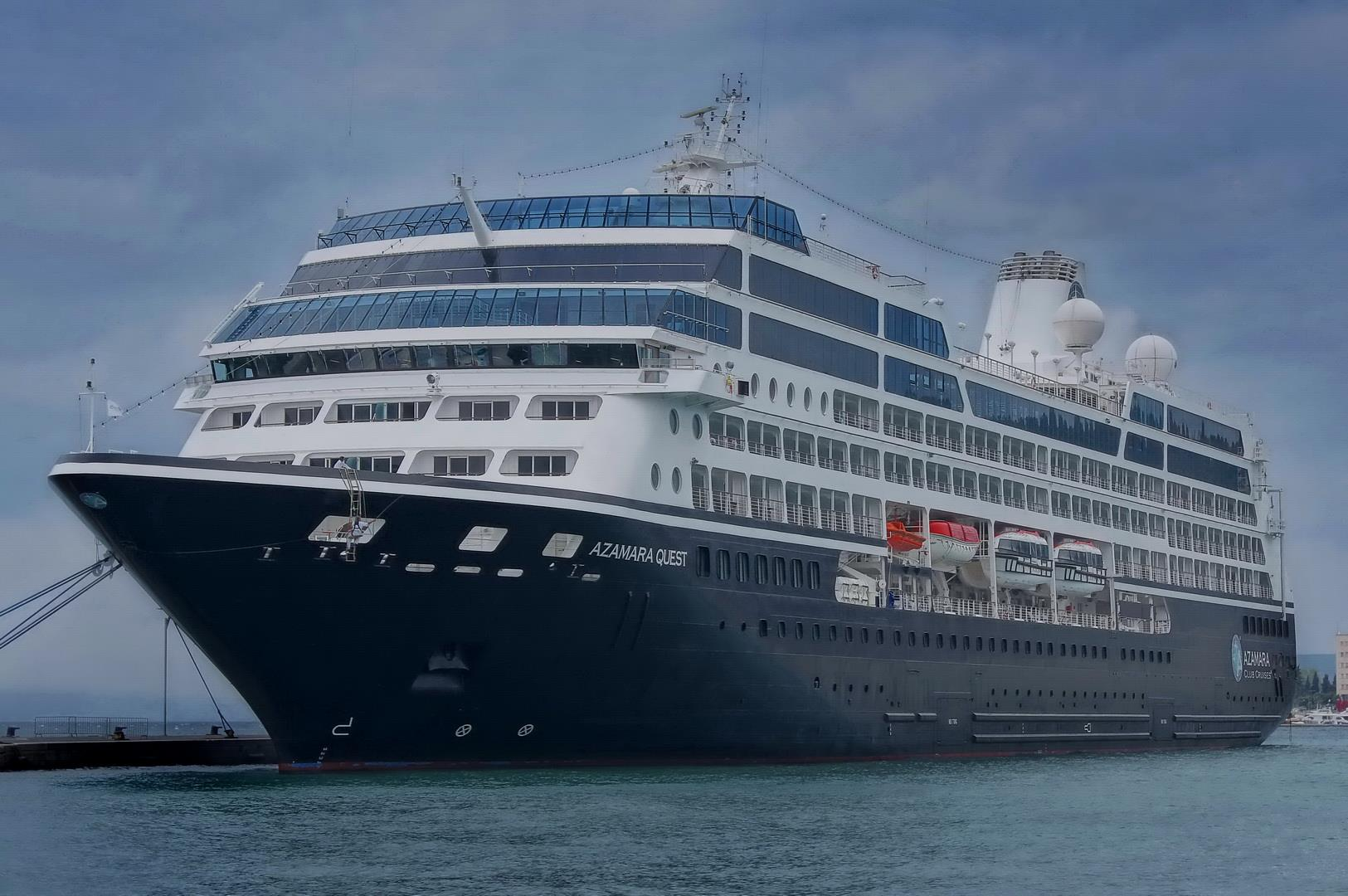
- Azamara Quest as seen in Split, on 29 September 2013

History

Malta
- Name: 2000–2003: R Seven; 2003–2006: Delphin Renaissance; 2006–2007: Blue Moon; 2007-present: Azamara Quest
- Owner: 2000–2001: Renaissance Cruises; 2001–2006: Cruiseinvest; 2006–2007: Pullmantur Cruises; 2007-2021: Azamara Cruises; 2021–present: Sycamore Partners
- Operator: 2000–2001: Renaissance Cruises; 2003–2006: Delphin Seereisen; 2006–2007: Pullmantur Cruises; 2007-present: Azamara Cruises
- Port of registry: 2000–2001: Monrovia, Liberia; 2001–2006: Majuro, Marshall Islands; 2006-present: Valletta, Malta
- Ordered: 1997
- Builder: Chantiers de l'Atlantique, Saint-Nazaire, France
- Yard number: Y31
- Laid down: 1999
- Launched: 23 May 2000
- Completed: 2000
- Acquired: 28 September 2000
- Maiden voyage: 2000
- Identification: Call sign: 9HOM8; IMO number: 9210218; MMSI number: 256216000
- Status: In service

General characteristics
- Class & type: R-class cruise ship
- Tonnage: 30,277 GT
- Length: 181.00 m (593 ft 10 in)
- Beam: 25.46 m (83 ft 6 in)
- Draft: 5.95 metres
- Depth: 5.95 m (20 ft)
- Decks: 11 (9 passenger decks)
- Installed power: 4 × 4,650 kW (6,240 hp) Wärtsilä Vasa 12V32
- Propulsion: Diesel-electric; 2 × 6,750 kW (9,050 hp) GEC Alstom electric motors, Two shafts; fixed pitch propellers
- Speed: 18 knots (33 km/h; 21 mph)
- Capacity: 686 passengers
- Crew: 408

Azamara Quest is an R-class cruise ship that entered service for Azamara Cruises on 24 October 2007. She was built in 2000 for Renaissance Cruises as R Seven. Following the collapse of Renaissance Cruises in 2001 she was laid up for two years, until chartered to the Germany-based Delphin Seereisen as Delphin Renaissance.

In 2006 she was sold to the Spain-based Pullmantur Cruises and renamed Blue Moon. She sailed for Pullmantur until 2007 when she was transferred to Azamara Cruises.

The Azamara Quest carries about 710 passengers (double occupancy) plus 410 crew members (1:2 staff to guest ratio). Her first season was in the Caribbean. Due to her small size, she is able to call at some of the lesser-visited ports such as Bordeaux, Split, St. Barts and Guadeloupe.

Sisterships: Azamara Journey, Azamara Pursuit, MS Insignia, MS Sirena, MS Regatta, MS Nautica, Pacific Princess.

== Service history ==
=== 2012 fire ===
In March 2012 the ship suffered a fire in one of the engine rooms which temporarily disabled the ship, carrying 1,001 passengers and crew in waters south of the Philippines.

Five crew were injured in the fire, which broke out on 30 March 2012 at 8:19pm EDT, a day after the ship left Manila for Sandakan, Malaysia. It was limited to the engine room and "quickly contained", according to Azamara. None of the passengers were injured.

Many guests praised the efforts of the crew and the entertainment department for keeping spirits high immediately following the harrowing experience.

=== 2016 Marlborough Sounds Collision ===
On 27 January 2016 the Azamara Quest was heading to the port of Picton, New Zealand. Whilst entering the Tory Channel (which leads through the Marlborough Sounds to Picton) the ship made its turn too late, turned too slowly and hit Wheki Rock. The hull and propeller sustained minor damage and the ship was able to continue to Picton. The NZ Transport Accident Investigation Commission report found that the accident was caused by a miscommunication between the Captain and the Pilot.

=== Effects of the worldwide pandemic ===
In 2020, due to the worldwide COVID-19 pandemic, sailings were suspended, on various dates in the various regions, by all cruise lines. As of 12 January 2021, a report indicated that Azamara was suspending all sailings "through April 30". From June 2020 until 26 July 2021, Azamara Quest was berthed in Glasgow's King George V Dock along with two of her sister ships Azamara Journey and Azamara Pursuit while cruise sailing was suspended.

== In popular culture ==
In 2015, the Azamara Journey and the Azamara Quest were the ships used by television presenter and biologist Nigel Marven for his UKTV documentary and travel program Cruise Ship Adventures with Nigel Marven. The program highlighted wildlife areas at popular cruise destinations.

== Gallery ==
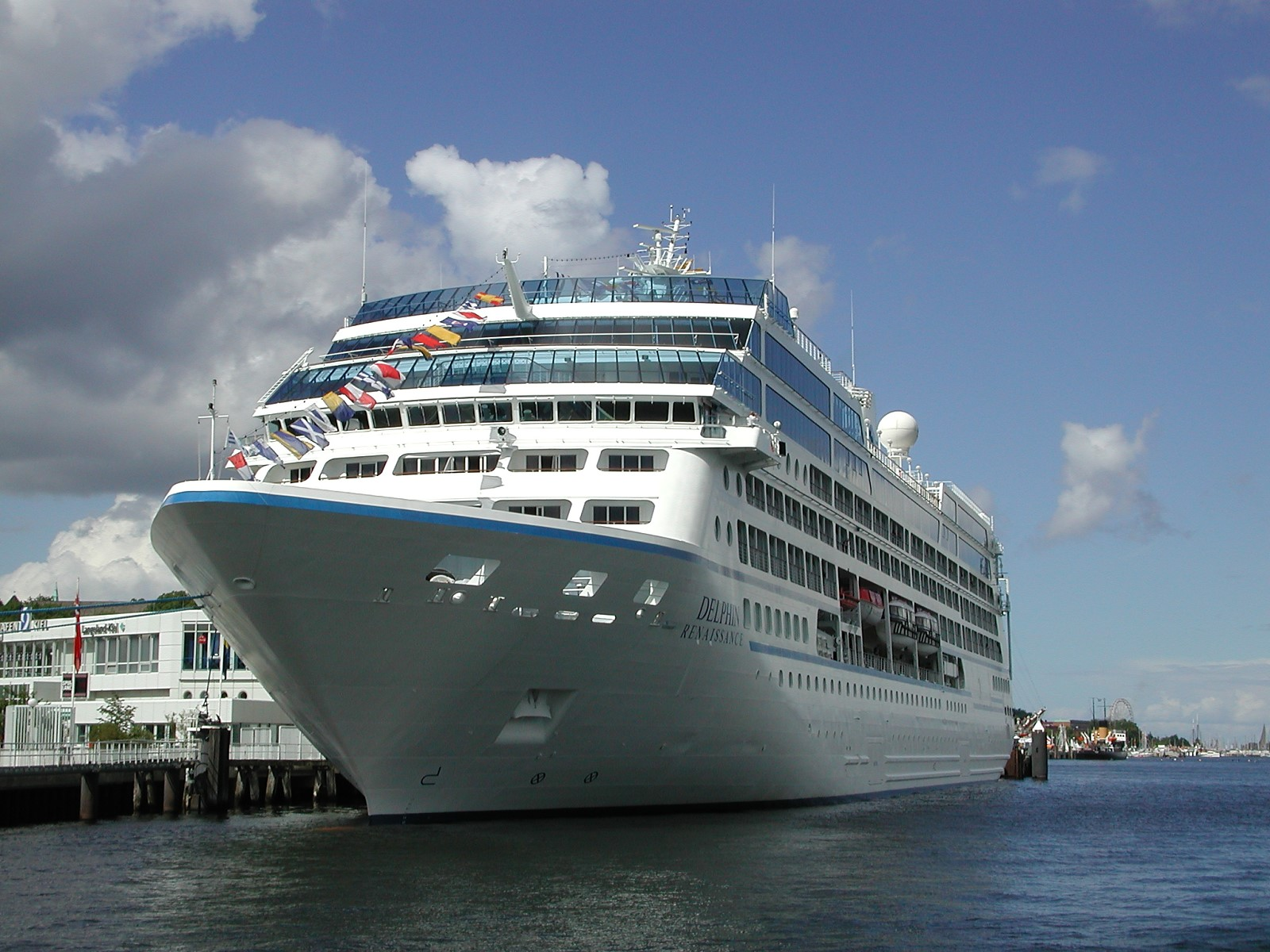
As Delphin Renaissance in Kiel in Delphin Seereisen colours

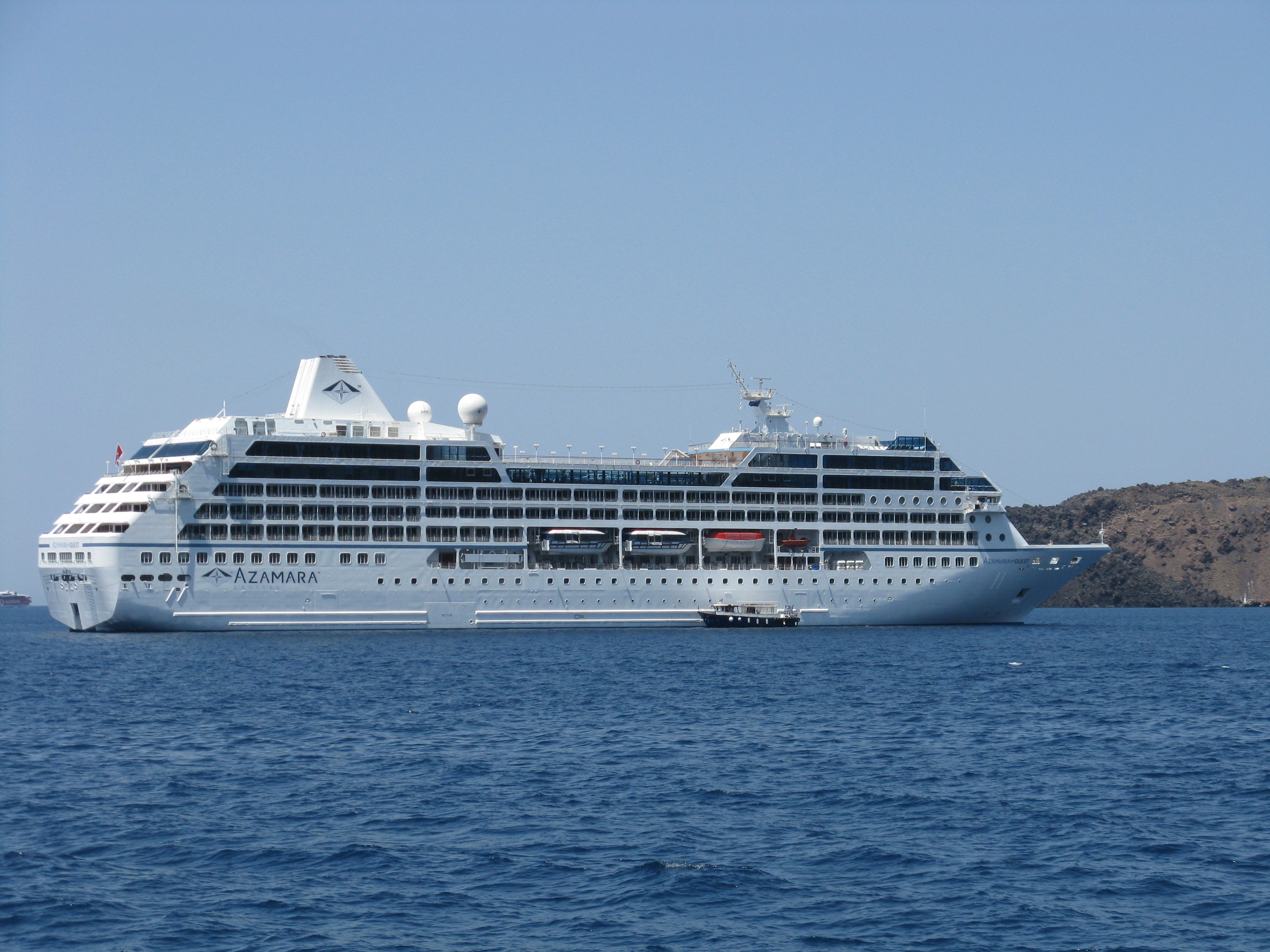
Azamara Quest in her previous livery, as seen off the coast of Santorini in July 2008

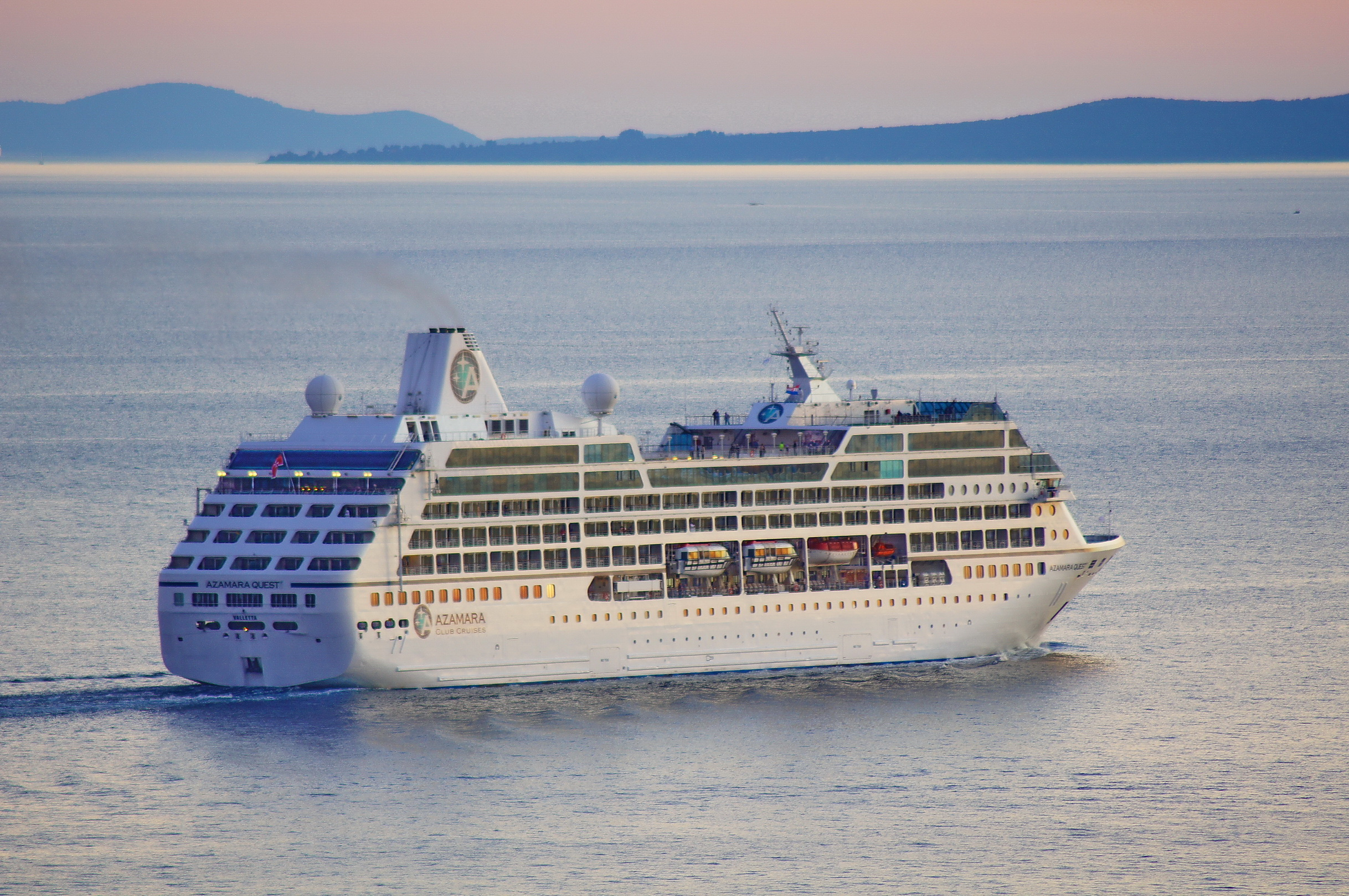
Azamara Quest departing Split, 13 November 2011

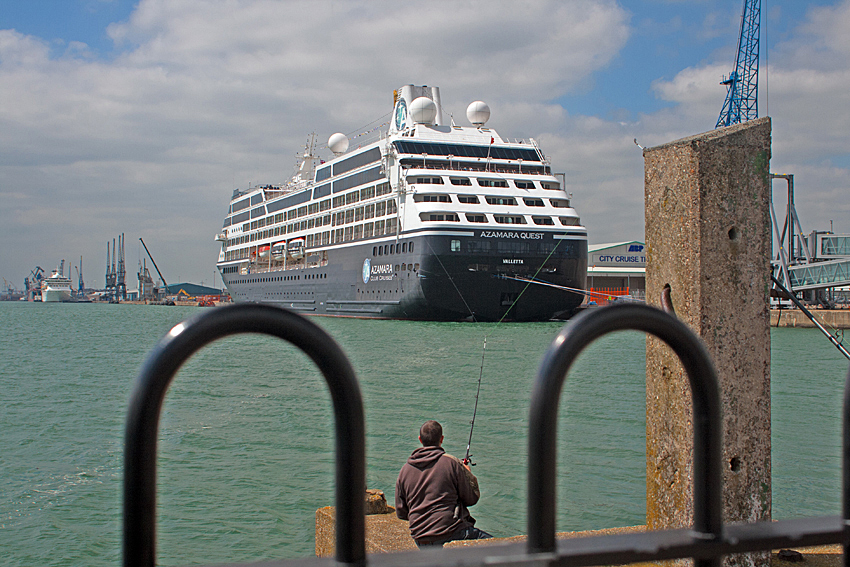
Azamara Quest at Southampton in 2013

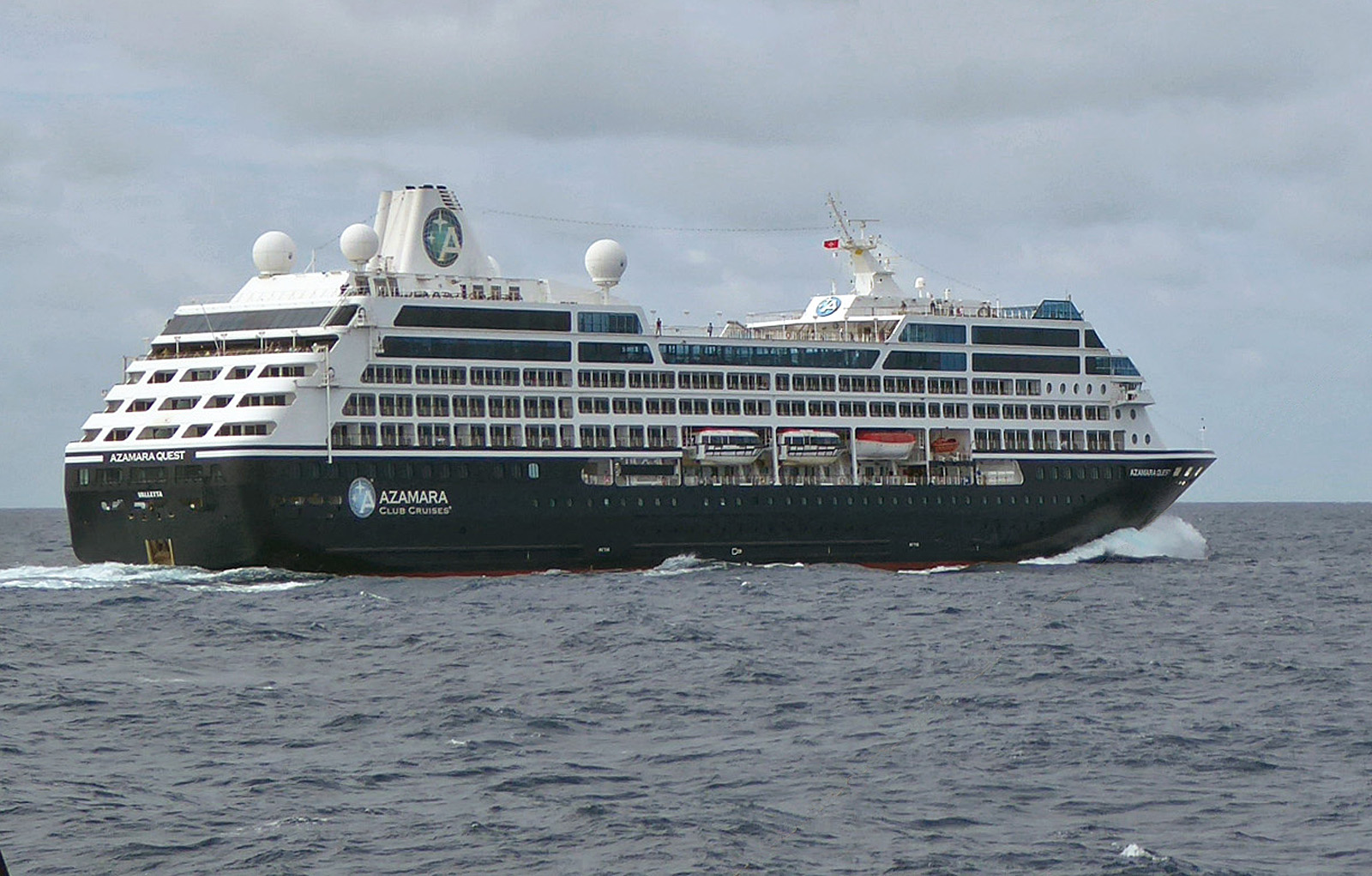
Azamara Quest 2018 in the Mediterranean
