= Pacific Princess (disambiguation) =

Pacific Princess may refer to:

- "Pacific Princess", the name of a B-25 Mitchell surviving aircraft
- Pacific Princess, a cruise ship owned and operated by Princess Cruises between 1975 and 2002, then sold and renamed the MS Pacific before being retired and dismantled in 2013, also known for being the boat on The Love Boat
- Pacific Princess, a cruise ship owned and operated by Princess Cruises between 2002 and 2021, then sold to Azamara and renamed Azamara Onward in 2021
