= Hebridean Sky =

Cruise ship

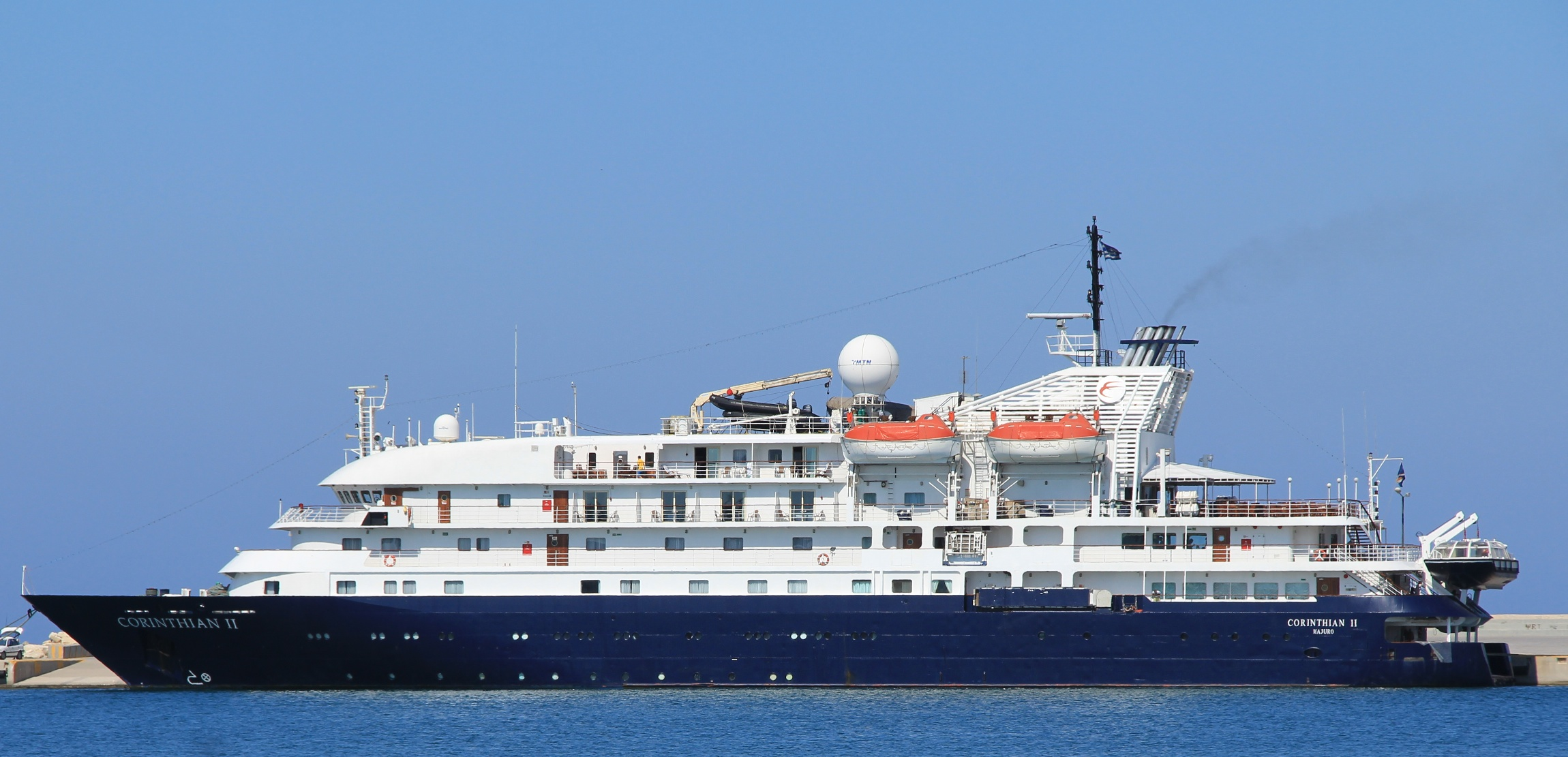
- Sea Explorer in harbor of Rethymno port (Greece, Crete)

History
- Name: Hebridean Sky; Sea Explorer I; Sea Explorer; Corinthian II; Island Sun; Sun; Renai I; Regina Renaissance; Renaissance VII
- Owner: Salén Ship Management
- Port of registry: 1991–1993: Palermo, Italy; 1993–2004: Monrovia, Liberia; 2004–2005: Nassau, Bahamas; 2005–2011: Valletta, Malta; 2011–2016: Majuro, Marshall Islands; 2016 onwards: Nassau, Bahamas
- Builder: Nuovi Cantieri Apuania, Carrara, Italy
- Yard number: 1146
- Laid down: December 17, 1987
- Launched: April 13, 1991
- Completed: December 02, 1991
- In service: April 13, 1991
- Identification: Call sign: C6BG2; IMO number: 8802882; MMSI number: 311000253
- Status: In service as of September 2023

General characteristics
- Tonnage: 4,200 GT, Net Tonnage: 1263 tons
- Displacement: 3,250 tons
- Length: 90.36 m (296 ft 5 in)
- Beam: 30 m (98 ft 5 in) (max); 28 m (92 ft) (waterline)
- Draught: 4.05 m (13 ft 3 in)
- Depth: 4.2 m (13 ft 9 in)
- Decks: 7
- Ice class: 1C
- Propulsion: 2 x B&W Holeby engines, 8L28/32AF, 2 x 1760 KW at 750 RPM
- Speed: 14.5 knots (26.9 km/h; 16.7 mph) (max)
- Capacity: 120 passengers
- Crew: 72

Hebridean Sky is a cruise ship owned by London-based cruise company Noble Caledonia. As an ice-rated vessel she has operated as an expedition cruise ship in Antarctica and in the Arctic. She was also known under the names Renaissance VII, Regina Renaissance, Renai I, Sun, Island Sun, Corinthian II, Sea Explorer, Sea Explorer I.

In the early 1990s the Renaissance Cruises company commissioned eight small cruise ships, all of which were given numeric names in the form of Roman figures (from I to VIII). The second group of four identical sister ships, V - VIII, was built in a different yard, and had increased capabilities. Originally named Renaissance VII, Hebridean Sky was the third ship of the second group.

Designed to operate in almost any place of the world, this ship accommodated up to 120 passengers in 59 cabins. The lounge and dining room were both large enough to welcome all passengers at one time. There were also other facilities, such as swimming pool and nightclub.

In 1992 Renaissance VII was chartered by a tour company, Raymond & White, and was renamed Regina Renaissance, cruising for several years in the Caribbean. The charter ended in 1998, and ship was returned to her original name and changed her itinerary for cruising in the Mediterranean in summer and in the Indian Ocean in winter, being presented mainly in North American and European markets.

Renaissance Cruises went bankrupt in October 2001, and Renaissance VII was sold to a business group that had invested in the company. They renamed the vessel Renai I, but she remained idle, for sale or charter.

In 2003 the ship's name was changed to Sun, and the year after, the vessel was bought by International Shipping, who renamed her Island Sun, and then she was chartered by Mauritius Island Cruises. They planned to operate the vessel on a regular basis, making cruises around Mauritius from Port Louis. However, the company did not pass through bureaucratic regulations enforced by the government and was forced to cease operations after only a couple of days.

During 2004, a company named Around The World Cruises began to promote cruises from Fremantle, Australia, for the coming summer. After experiencing some difficulties, the company finally managed to obtain Island Sun at a very short notice, and she duly arrived in Fremantle on 26 November. After making only four short cruises the departure that was scheduled for 10 December was cancelled almost before the voyage, and the operating company went bankrupt few days later.

A bit later Mauritius Island Cruises also collapsed, and in 2005 Island Sun was sold to the Danish Clipper Group, and the vessel was chartered to an American company named Travel Dynamics International. They renamed the vessel Corinthian II, refurbished and redecorated her, and for eight years she cruised mainly in the Mediterranean region and later in Antarctica.

In 2013 the ship was chartered from Clipper Group by Polar Latitudes and Poseidon Expeditions. They operated her in Antarctica and the Arctic.

In 2014 the ship was acquired by Noble Caledonia, a company that already owned sister vessels Island Sky (formerly Renaissance VIII) and Caledonian Sky (formerly Renaissance VI). The ship was refitted in April 2016.

December 2024 she is traveling the coast of Madagascar, docking in Fort Dauphin at the Port d'Ehola for the day. She will be returning to Madagascar in 2025 with other cruises up and down the coast of SE Africa from South Africa to Mauritius.
