= Nautica (disambiguation) =

Nautica is a clothing company.

Nautica may also refer to:

- MS Nautica, a cruise ship owned and operated by Oceania Cruises
- Nautica Waterfront District, an area of The Flats in Cleveland, Ohio
  - Jacobs Pavilion at Nautica, formerly named Nautica Stage and Nautica Pavilion

== See also ==
- Nautical
