= Azamara Journey =

Cruise ship

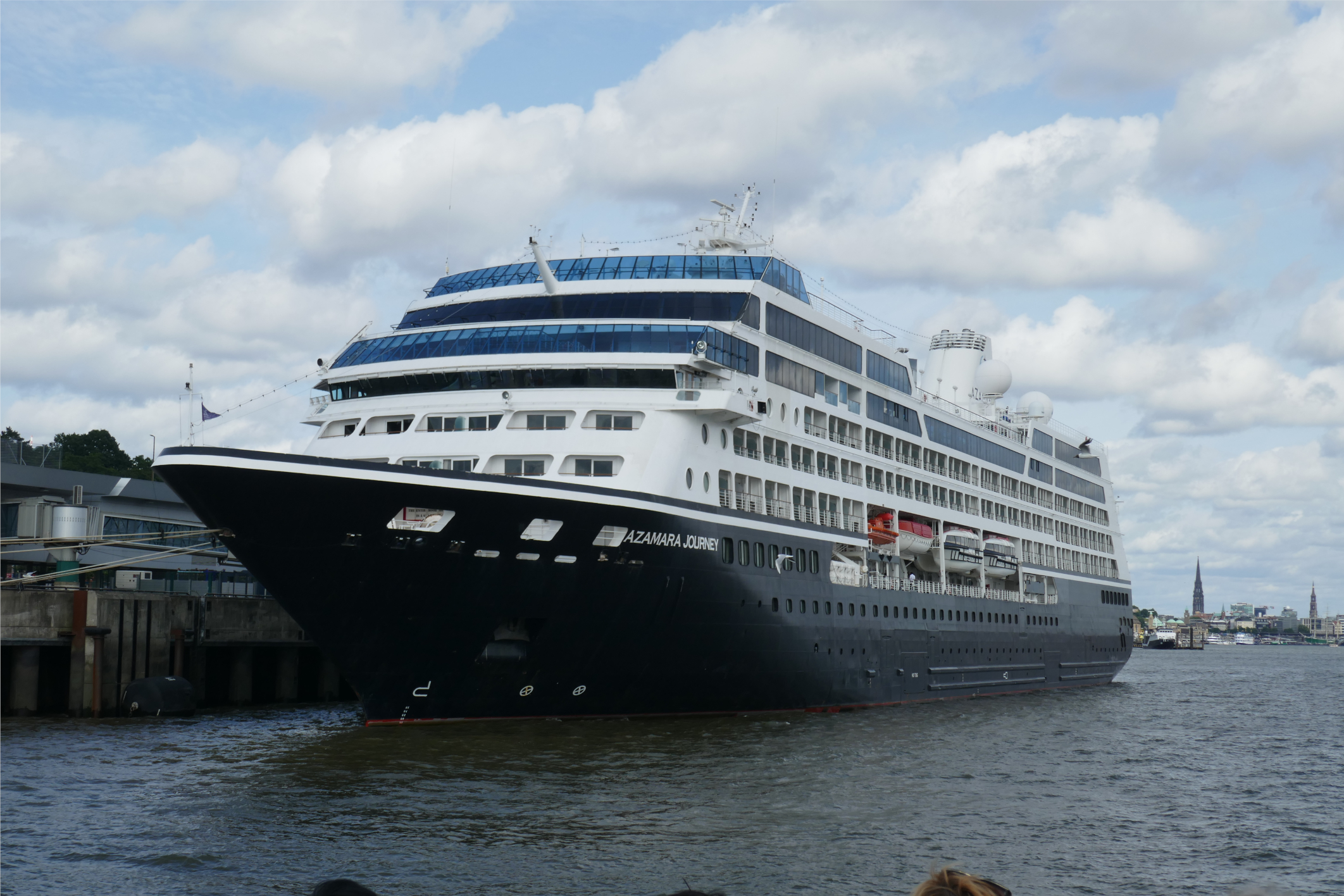
- Azamara Journey in Hamburg in 2026

History

Malta
- Name: 2000–2003: R Six; 2003–2005: Blue Star; 2005–2007: Blue Dream; 2007-present: Azamara Journey
- Owner: 2008–2012: Azamara Journey inc.; 2021–present: Sycamore Partners
- Operator: 2000-2001: Renaissance Cruises 2001-2003: laid up 2003-2007: Pullmantur Cruises 2007-present: Azamara Cruises
- Port of registry: 2000–2001: Monrovia, Liberia; 2001–2005: Majuro, Marshall Islands; 2005–2006: Nassau, Bahamas; 2006–2013: Valletta, Malta
- Ordered: 1997
- Builder: Chantiers de l'Atlantique, Saint-Nazaire
- Laid down: 20 September 1999
- Launched: 17 January 2000
- Completed: 24 June 2000
- Acquired: 2000
- Maiden voyage: 2000
- In service: 2000
- Renamed: 2007
- Identification: Call sign 9HOB8; IMO number: 9200940; MMSI number: 256204000
- Status: In service

General characteristics
- Class & type: R-class cruise ship
- Tonnage: 30,277 GT
- Length: 181.00 m (593.83 ft)
- Beam: 25.46 m (83.5 ft)
- Draught: 5.8 metres
- Depth: 5.80 m (19.0 ft)
- Decks: 11
- Propulsion: two propeller shafts and two fixed pitch propellers
- Speed: 18 knots (33 km/h; 21 mph)
- Capacity: 694 passengers
- Crew: 407

Azamara Journey is an R-class cruise ship owned and operated by Azamara Club Cruises. Gross register tonnage is 30,277, with a capacity of 694 passengers (double occupancy), plus 390 crew members. She was built in 2000 for Renaissance Cruises as R Six. After the bankruptcy of Renaissance Cruises, she sailed for Pullmantur Cruises who renamed her Blue Star in 2003 and Blue Dream in 2005.

== History ==
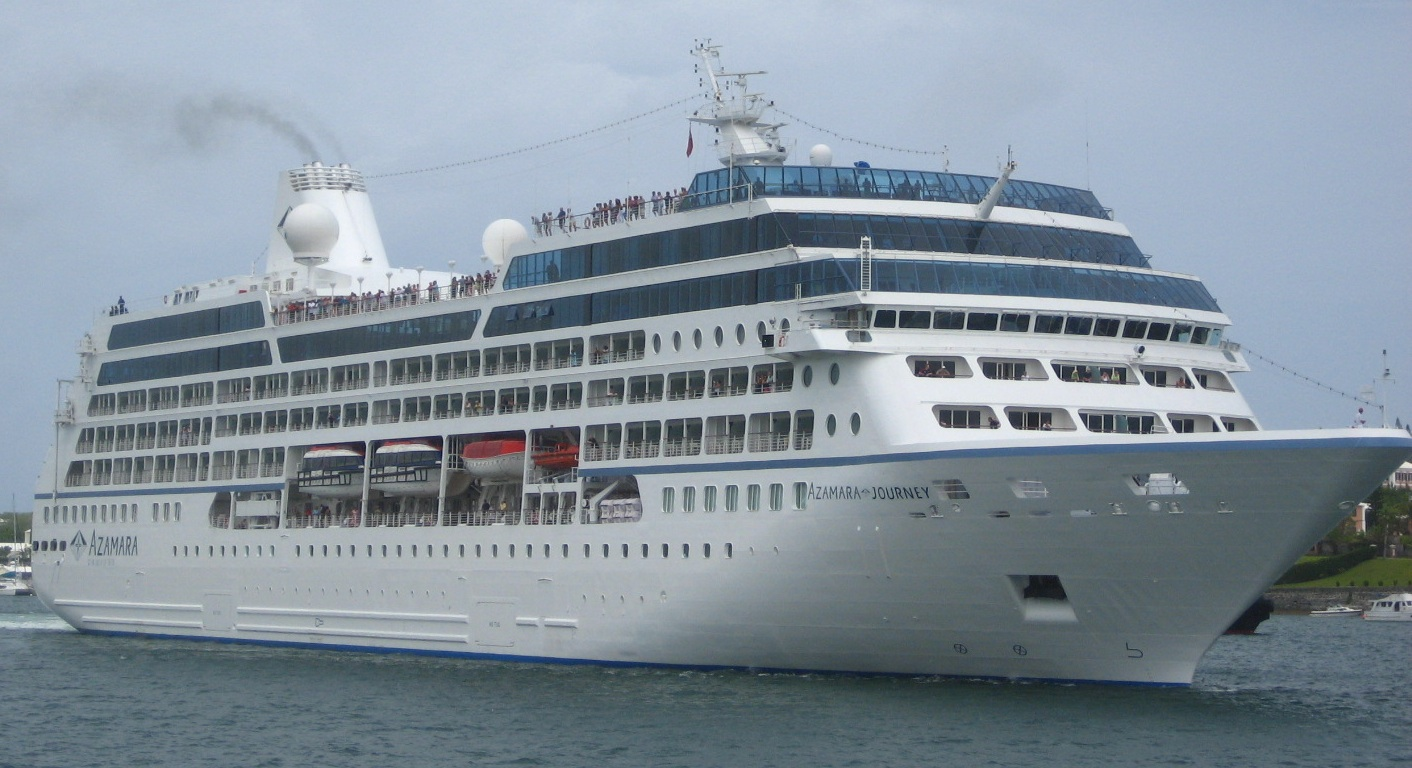
Azamara Journey in her previous livery, as seen at leaving Hamilton, Bermuda in August 2007

The ship was built in 2000 by the Chantiers de l'Atlantique in Saint-Nazaire, the sixth ship of the comprehensive eight ships "R-Class" for Renaissance Cruises shipping company and was named R Six. The ship was sold in early 2001 to the Cruise Company Invest. Due to illiquidity turned Renaissance Cruises end of September 2001 the operation and the R Six was launched mid-2003. She was then chartered to the cruise line Pullmantur Cruises and use of this under the marketing name for Blue Star Cruises (but not yet officially renamed). Since July 2005, the ship was called the Blue Dream.

From 2006, the ship was used by Pullmantur. Royal Caribbean Cruises Ltd., the parent company of Pullmantur, transferred the Blue Dream on 15 December 2008 its new subsidiary Azamara Cruises, where it was renamed Azamara Journey; and since then with her sister ship Azamara Quest, the former R Seven, and since 2018 with her sister ship Azamara Pursuit, the former R Eight, is used worldwide for cruises. Azamara Cruises has been renamed Azamara Club Cruises.

In 2015, the Azamara Journey and the Azamara Quest were the ships used by television presenter and biologist Nigel Marven for his UKTV documentary/travel programme "Cruise Ship Adventures with Nigel Marven", during which Nigel showed areas with outstanding wildlife that can be visited in popular cruise destinations.

During the COVID-19 pandemic Journey and two of her sisterships Azamara Pursuit and Azamara Quest berthed in Glasgow's King George V Dock between June 2020 and July/August 2021 with Journey being the last to leave on 9 August 2021.

== See also ==
- List of cruise ships
