= Renaissance Cruises =

Former cruise ship company

Renaissance Cruises was a cruise ship operating company that was founded in 1989 (37 years ago) and owned by Fearnley & Eger Rederi in Oslo, Norway. It was purchased by Edward Rudner (founder of Alamo Car Rental) as the company faltered during the Gulf War. It operated year-round cruise itineraries to the Mediterranean Sea, the Greek Isles, Tahiti and the South Pacific, northern Europe and Scandinavia. The company ceased operations on 25 September 2001 (24 years ago), having accommodated up to 220,000 guests in 2000. While the company had been in poor financial health for quite some time, the economic decline resulting from the September 11 attacks in 2001 is credited with the demise of this cruise line. It was headquartered in Fort Lauderdale, Florida.

== Fleet ==
=== Renaissance class ===
The company also owned and operated eight Renaissance-class yacht-like ships between 1989 and 1992. The first four of them were built in Cantieri Navale Ferrari-Signani shipyards in La Spezia, Italy, from 1989 to 1991. They were 88.3 metres (289 ft 8 in) long, and 4,077 gross tonnage (GT) in size, and they carried 100 passengers in 50 cabins, with 72 crew. The other four were built in Nuovi Cantieri Apuania shipyards in Carrara, Italy, in the same period. They were 90.6 metres (297 ft 3 in) long and 4,200 GT in size, and they carried 114 passengers in 57 cabins with 72 crew. The small, intimately sized vessels used Roman numeral designations as part of their names: Renaissance I through Renaissance VIII.

These are the current names, former names and registries of the Renaissance-class ships; Renaissance I, Renaissance III, Renaissance IV, and Renaissance VIII were all chartered and sold in 1998 so the line could concentrate on the larger, newer R class. Before the line folded for the R class, Renaissance V, Renaissance VI, and Renaissance VII were sold to other interests. Renaissance II was renamed Neptune II In 1998 for operations in Singapore before EasyCruise was formed. Current operators of these vessels include Noble-Caledonia, Silversea, and Antarctica XXI.

==== Renaissance class I ====
Built at Cantieri Navale Ferrari-Signani shipyard (1989–1991):

Ship	Image	Built	In service for Renaissance Cruises	Gross tonnage	History and status
Renaissance I		1989	1989–1991	4,077	(a) Renaissance I (b) The Mercury (c) Leisure World (d) Dubawi. Now sailing as a yacht.
Renaissance II		1990	1990–1998	4,077	(a) Renaissance II (b) Neptune II (c) EasycruiseOne (d) Cruise One. Laid up from 2008–2022. Sold for scrap in 2022.
Renaissance III		1990	1990–1997	4,077	(a) Renaissance III (b) Galapagos Explorer II (c) Silver Galapagos (d) Mantra.
Renaissance IV		1990	1990–1996	4,077	(a) Renaissance IV (b) Clelia II (1998), Troodos (c) Orion II (d) Corinthian from 2013, Travel Dynamics Int.

==== Renaissance class II ====
Built at Nuovi Cantieri Apuania shipyard (1991–1992):

Ship	Image	Built	In service for Renaissance Cruises	Gross tonnage	History and status
Renaissance V		1991	1991–1998	4,200	(a) Renaissance V (briefly Hanseatic Renaissance) (b) Sun Viva (1997), Sun Cruise (c) MegaStar Sagittarius (2000), Star Cruises (d) Spirit of Oceanus (2000), Cruise West (e) Sea Spirit (2010), Noble-Caledonia Cruises.
Renaissance VI		1991	1991–1998	4,200	a) Renaissance VI (b) Sun Viva 2 (1997), Sun cruise (c) MegaStar Capricorn (2000), Star Cruises (d) Hebridean Spirit (2000) (e) Caledonian Sky (2012), Noble-Caledonia Cruises.
Renaissance VII		1991	1991–2001	4,200	(a) Renaissance VII (b) Renai I (c) Island Sun (d) Corinthian II (1991) (e) Sea Explorer (f) Hebridean Sky (2016), Noble-Caledonia Cruises
Renaissance VIII		1992	1992–2001	4,200	(a) Renaissance VIII (b) Renai II (c) Island Sky (1992), Noble-Caledonia Cruises

=== R class ===
The pride of the fleet were the line's eight brand new 684-passenger R-class ships named R One, R Two, R Three, R Four, R Five, R Six, R Seven and R Eight. The ships in this class were all built between 1998 and 2001. They were all built at the shipyard of Chantiers de l'Atlantique in Saint-Nazaire France and were designed, internally and externally, by British designer John McNeece. Following the bankruptcy of Renaissance Cruises, all of the vessels were chartered or sold to other cruise lines and continue to operate to this day.

Ship	Image	Built	In service for Renaissance Cruises	Gross tonnage	Initial Flag	History and status
R One		1998	1998–2001	30,277	Liberia	Entered service for Renaissance Cruises in 1998. After the bankruptcy of the company, she was sold to Cruiseinvest, but was laid up until 2003, when she was chartered to Oceania Cruises and renamed Insignia. In 2006, Oceania Cruises purchased the vessel. In April 2012, she was renamed to Columbus 2 and sailing for Hapag-Lloyd. In 2014, she reverted to Oceania Cruises after the launch of Hapag-Lloyd's Europa 2, and currently sails as Insignia.
R Two		1998	1998–2001	30,277	Liberia	Entered service for Renaissance Cruises in 1998. After the bankruptcy of the company, she was sold to Cruiseinvest, but was laid up until 2002, when she was chartered to the newly established Oceania Cruises and renamed Insignia. She was renamed Regatta the following year. In 2006, Oceania Cruises purchased the vessel.
R Three		1999	1999–2001	30,277	Liberia	Entered service for Renaissance Cruises in 1999. After the bankruptcy of the company, she was laid up until late 2002, when she was sold to Princess Cruises and renamed Pacific Princess. In 2021, Azamara Club Cruises purchased the vessel joining the Journey, Quest and Pursuit. The vessel was renamed Azamara Onward and began offering cruises in 2022.
R Four		1999	1999–2001	30,277	Liberia	Entered service for Renaissance Cruises in 1999. After the bankruptcy of the company, she was laid up until late 2002, when she was sold to Princess Cruises and renamed Tahitian Princess. The ship was renamed again to Ocean Princess in November 2009. It was announced on November 25, 2014, that the ship was to be sold to Oceania Cruises under a definitive agreement. She departed the Princess fleet in March 2016 and underwent a 35-day, $40 million refurbishment in Marseille, France to become Sirena for Oceania Cruises.
R Five		2000	2000–2001	30,277	Liberia	Entered service for Renaissance Cruises in 2000. After the bankruptcy of the company, she was sold to Cruiseinvest, but was laid up until 2002, when she was chartered to Pullmantur Cruises under the marketing name Blue Dream. In 2005, the vessel was renamed Nautica, and Oceania Cruises purchase was finalized in 2006.
R Six		2000	2000–2001	30,277	Liberia	Entered service for Renaissance Cruises in 2000. After the bankruptcy of the company, she was sold to Cruiseinvest, but was laid up until 2003, when she was chartered to Pullmantur Cruises under the marketing name Blue Star. In 2005 she was renamed Blue Dream, and was sold to Pullmantur the following year. In 2007, she was transferred to Azamara Club Cruises and was renamed Azamara Journey.
R Seven		2000	2000–2001	30,277	Liberia	Entered service for Renaissance Cruises in 2001. After the bankruptcy of the company, she was sold to Cruiseinvest, but was laid up until 2003, when she was chartered to Delphin Seereisen under the name Delphin Renaissance. In 2006, she was sold to Pullmantur Cruises and was renamed Blue Moon. In 2007, she was transferred to Azamara Club Cruises and was renamed Azamara Quest.
R Eight		2001	2001–2001	30,277	Liberia	Entered service for Renaissance Cruises in 2001. After the bankruptcy of the company, she was sold to Cruiseinvest but was laid up until 2003, when she was chartered to Swan Hellenic Cruises and renamed Minerva II. In March 2006, Princess Cruises announced that they were acquiring Minerva II and the ship debuted in the Princess fleet in April 2007, upon which she was renamed Royal Princess. At the end of April 2011, Royal Princess was transferred to P&O Cruises and was renamed Adonia. In 2015, Carnival Corporation & plc announced the founding of a new brand oriented at social impact, called Fathom, with Adonia being the lead vessel for the brand. When Fathom ended operations in 2017, she was returned to P&O Cruises, but was retired a year later, in 2018, having been sold to Azamara Club Cruises. After an extensive refit, she officially began sailing for Azamara as Azamara Pursuit in August 2018.
