= Fathom (cruise line) =

Fathom Travel Ltd.
- Company type: Subsidiary
- Industry: Transportation
- Founded: June 4, 2015
- Defunct: January 8, 2019
- Fate: Brand Discontinued
- Headquarters: Doral, Florida, United States
- Area served: United States
- Key people: Tara Russell (President)
- Products: Cruises
- Parent: Carnival Corporation & plc
- Website: Archived official website at the Wayback Machine (archive index)

Fathom was a cruise travel experience brand owned by Carnival Corporation & plc and a former cruise line. It was registered in the United Kingdom, and based in Doral, Florida. The line was designed to operate in the "social impact travel" market. Fathom later used other ships within the Carnival Corporation to operate its cruises. In its short time as a cruise line, Fathom made history as they marked the return of cruises from the United States to Cuba following the improvement of relations with Cuba and the United States.

== History ==
Arnold Donald, CEO of Carnival

Fathom will cater to an under served market of consumers who want to have a positive impact on people’s lives, and aren’t always sure where to begin.

Fathom was initially established by Carnival as a cruise line on June 4, 2015, to operate "social impact travel" journeys lasting seven days from PortMiami, Florida, to the Dominican Republic. The journeys included volunteer activities with established organizations on the ground. Carnival reassigned the MV Adonia to Fathom as its first ship.

On May 2, 2016, Adonia docked in the port of Havana, the first port of her Cuban itinerary for Fathom. It marked the first time in over 50 years that a U.S. cruise line has sailed from the U.S. to Cuba. It was also the first time in decades that Cuban-born individuals were able to travel by sea to or from Cuba.

In November 2016, it was announced that Fathom would discontinue cruise line operations in June 2017, while the name continued as a branded experience on other Carnival cruise lines including AIDA Cruises, Carnival Cruise Lines, Costa Cruises, Holland America Line, Princess Cruises, and P&O Cruises. The MV Adonia, its only ship, was returned to P&O Cruises. The last announced voyages with Fathom took place on six Princess cruises in 2018.

On January 8, 2019, the Fathom brand was quietly discontinued. Upon the brand's discontinuation, the website was shut down and redirected visitors to Carnival's Global Impact page until the domain expired. No further announcements have been made about the future of Fathom.

== Management ==
Fathom's president was Tara Russell, an entrepreneur who founded Create Common Good, a nonprofit enterprise that provides food service job training to help at-risk people become self-sufficient. Russell is the global impact lead for Carnival, working with its 10 cruise line brands on social impact strategies. In that role, she reported directly to Arnold Donald.

== Former fleet ==
Ship	Class	Built	Builder	In service for Fathom	Gross Tonnage	Flag	Notes	Image
Adonia	R class	2001	Chantiers de l'Atlantique	2016-2017	30,277 GT	Bermuda	The ship was supported and maintained by P&O Cruises while it was in service for Fathom. It was returned to P&O in June 2017.	
