= MV Corinthian =

Cruise ship built in 1990

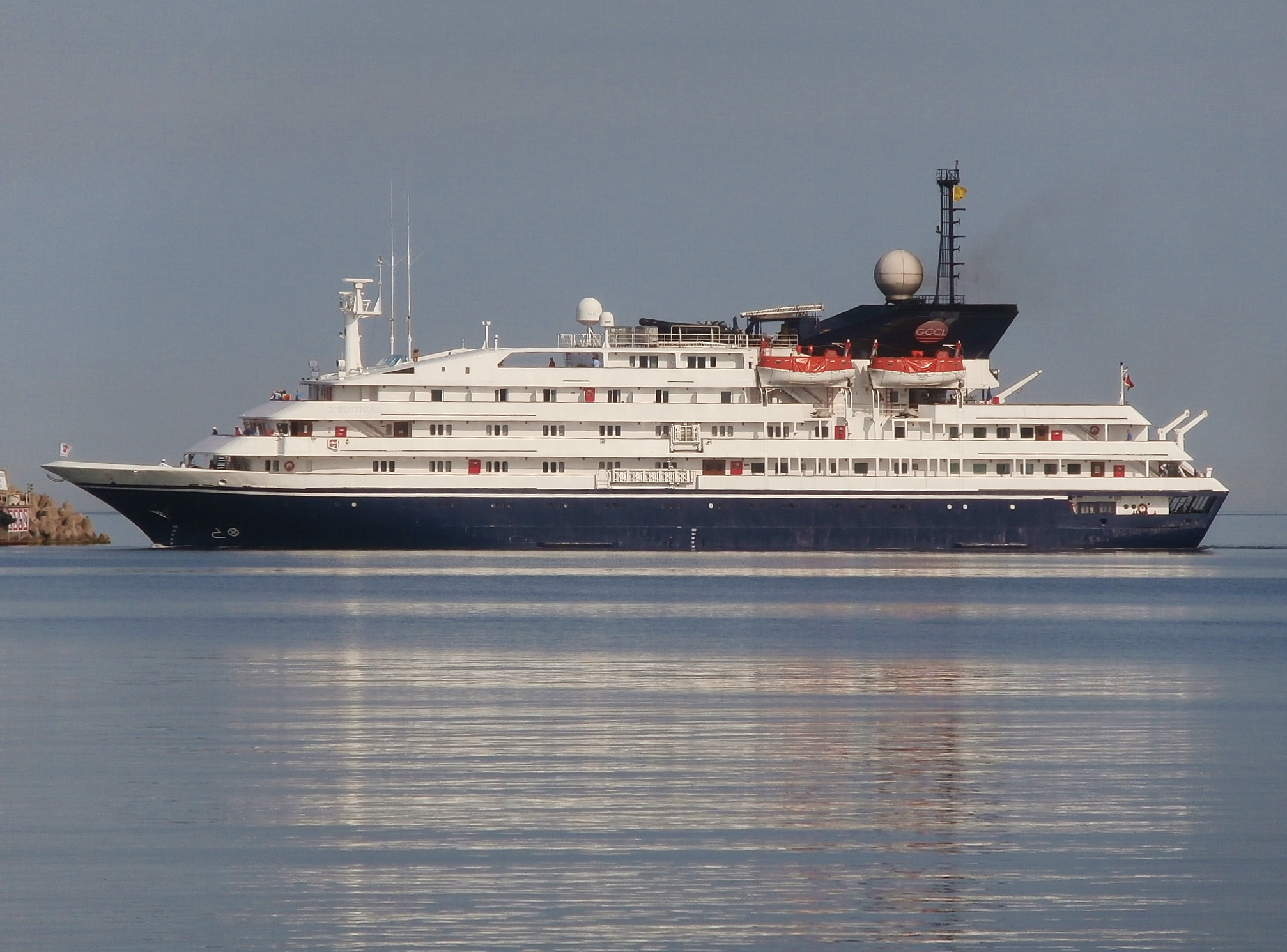
- Cruise ship Corinthian arriving at Tallinn 12 August 2015

History
- Name: Renaissance Four; Clelia II; Orion II
- Owner: GCCL Malta Fleet 4
- Operator: Renaissance Cruises; Polar Cruises; Travel Dynamics International; Orion Expedition Cruises (2012); Grand Circle Cruise Line
- Port of registry: 1990–1994: Palermo, Italy; 1994–1996: Monrovia, Liberia; 1996–2008: Nassau, Bahamas; 2008 onwards: Valletta, Malta
- Builder: Cantieri Navale Ferrari-Signani, Italy
- Yard number: 46
- Launched: 9 March 1990
- Completed: 1990
- Refit: 2009
- Identification: Call sign: 9HUT9; IMO number: 8708672; MMSI number: 249556000
- Status: Ship in active service

General characteristics
- Type: Passenger ship
- Tonnage: 4,077 GT; 2,420 DWT
- Length: 88 m (288 ft 9 in)
- Beam: 15.3 m (50 ft 2 in)
- Draft: 4.5 m (14 ft 9 in)
- Propulsion: 2 × 2,520 kW (3,379 hp) MAN B&W diesel engines; 1 Bow thruster 550kW
- Speed: 14 knots (26 km/h; 16 mph)
- Capacity: 100 passengers
- Crew: 70

MV Corinthian is a cruise vessel that operates on the Great Lakes, in the Mediterranean, and around Antarctica. Summer ports of call in the Great Lakes include Toronto, Port Weller, Little Current, and Thunder Bay in Ontario, Canada, and Mackinac Island, Houghton, and Duluth in the United States.

She was launched in 1990, built by Cantiere Navale Ferrari-Signani in La Spezia, Italy, and was operated by Renaissance Cruises and Great Lakes Cruise Company as the Renaissance IV. After Renaissance Cruises ceased operations, she was known for a time as the Clelia II.

In December 2010 the Clelia II was partially disabled by a rogue wave while transiting the Drake Passage. The rogue wave also damaged the ship's bridge. The nearby MS National Geographic Explorer rendered assistance.

The London Free Press reported that during its thirteen visits during the 2010 season passengers and crew spent $600,000 CAD in Little Current, a small community on Manitoulin Island.

Chartered by New York-based Travel Dynamics International, on 26 December 2009, the Clelia II, ran aground along the Antarctic Peninsula, its starboard propeller hitting the rocks resulting in the shutdown of the starboard engine and loss of electrical power aboard the ship. Another tourist ship, the National Geographic Explorer, was nearby and helped pull it off the rocks.

She is currently operated by Grand Circle Cruise Line. She carries approximately 100 passengers.
