= MV Minerva =

Cruise ship built in 1989

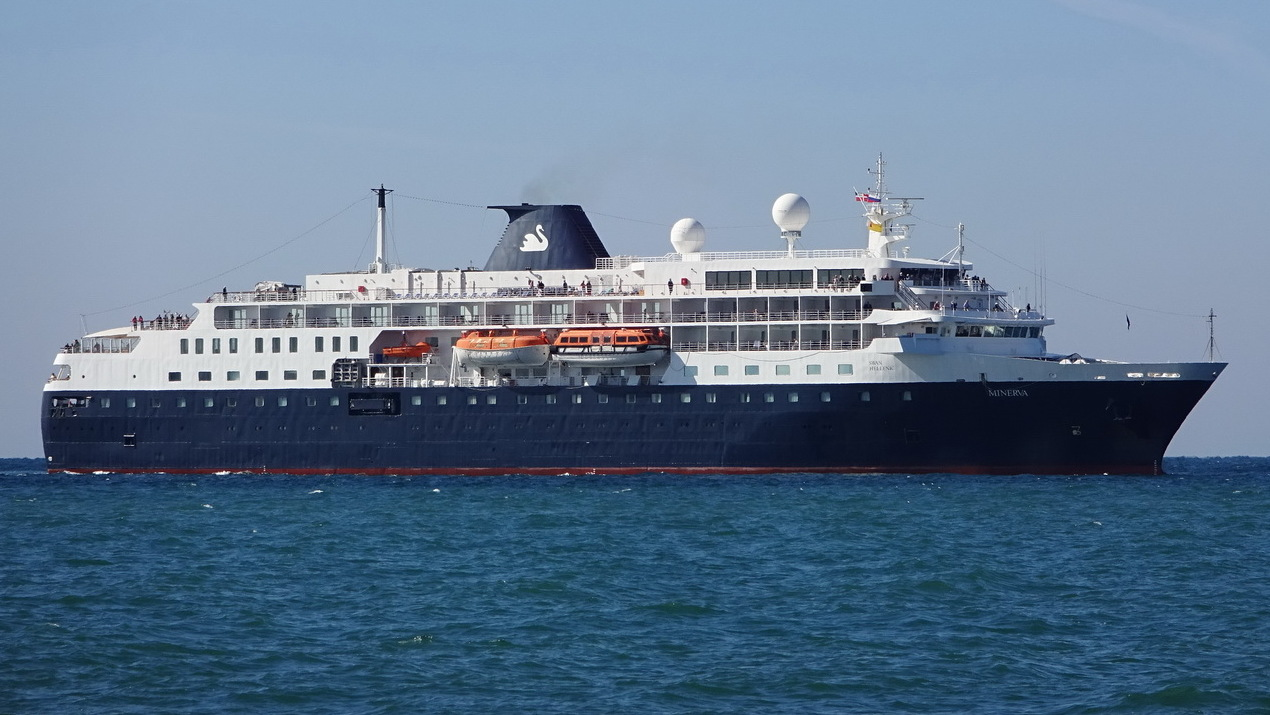
- Minerva at Krasnodarskiy Kray 8 October 2015.

History
- Name: Okean; Minerva; Saga Pearl; Explorer II; Alexander Von Humboldt; Minerva
- Operator: Swan Hellenic
- Port of registry: Nassau, Bahamas
- Laid down: 1989
- Launched: 1990
- Completed: 1996
- Maiden voyage: 1996
- In service: 29 April 1996
- Identification: IMO number: 9144196
- Status: Laid-up

General characteristics
- Tonnage: 12,892 GT
- Length: 436 ft (133 m)
- Beam: 66.5 ft (20.3 m)
- Draught: 18.9 ft (5.8 m)
- Decks: 6 (passenger decks)
- Speed: 15 knots (28 km/h; 17 mph)
- Capacity: 350 passengers
- Crew: 160

The Minerva is a cruise ship built in 1989, and originally intended as a Soviet research vessel, the Okean. The deal to purchase her fell through and Swan Hellenic (at the time a subsidiary of P&O Cruises) purchased her in 1996 and renamed her Minerva.

== History ==
She sailed with Swan Hellenic until her lease ran out in 2003. She briefly sailed with Saga Cruises as the Saga Pearl, and was then chartered to Abercrombie & Kent as the Explorer II, making voyages to Antarctica and South America from December to April with up to 198 passengers. From May to November, she sailed for the German-owned travel company Phoenix Reisen as the Alexander von Humboldt.

In July 2007, it was announced that the ship had been acquired by the relaunched Swan Hellenic line and the name would revert to Minerva. In early 2012, Minerva received a multi-million-pound, 83-day refit.

In January 2017, Swan Hellenic went into administration and cancelled cruises on Minerva until further notice.

== Gallery ==
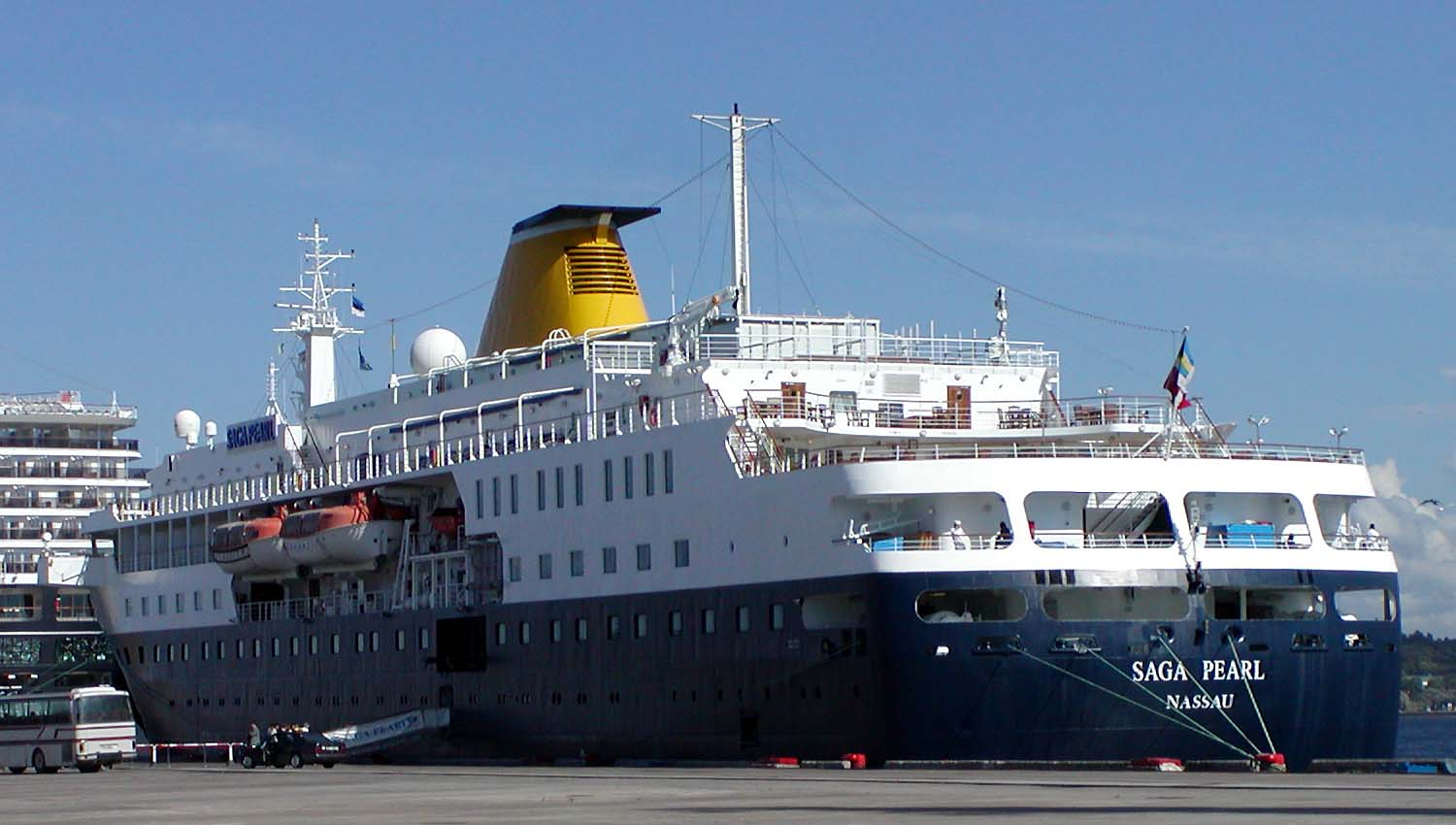
Saga Pearl at Tallinn in 2003

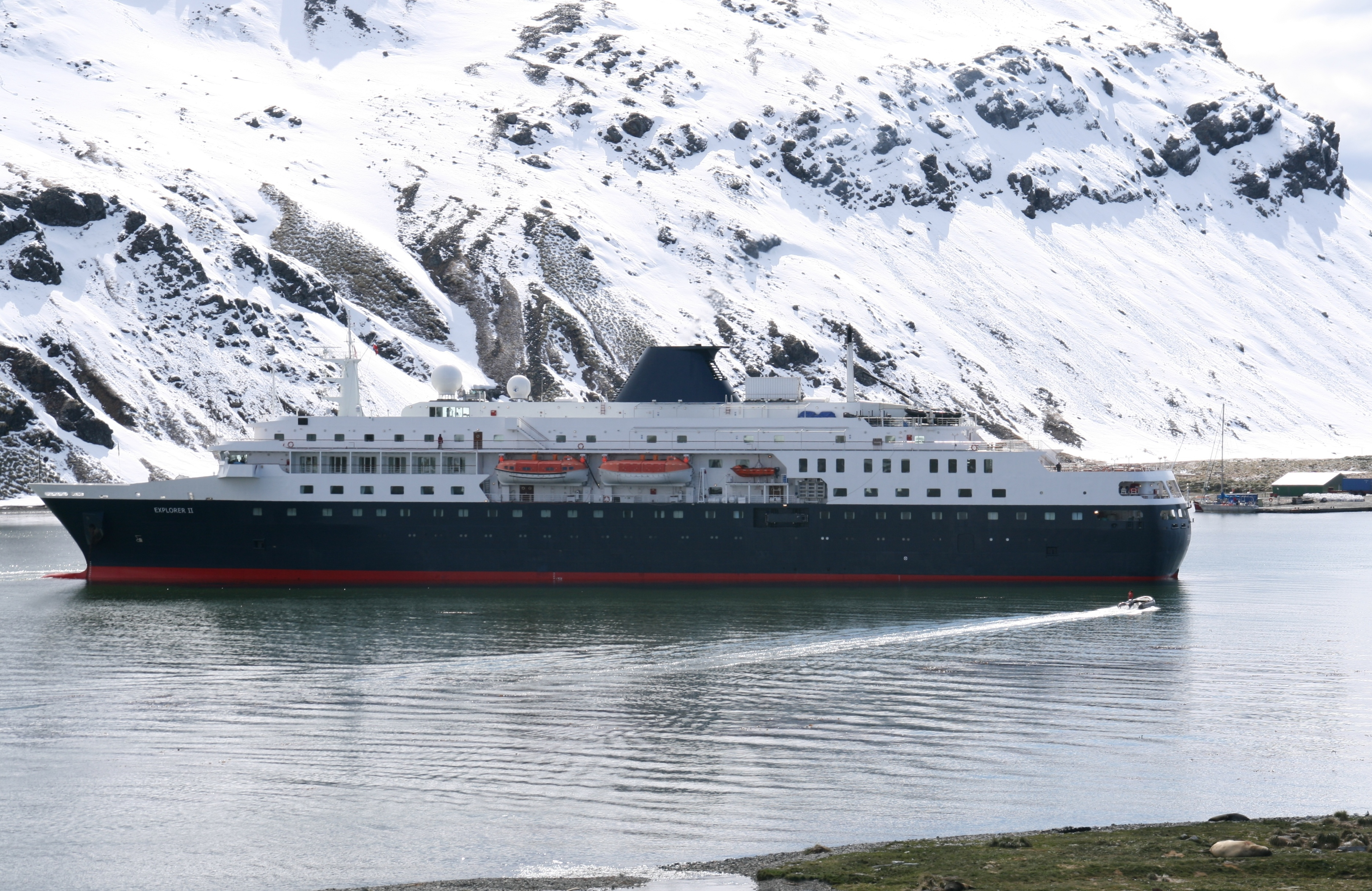
Explorer II at Grytviken, South Georgia in 2007

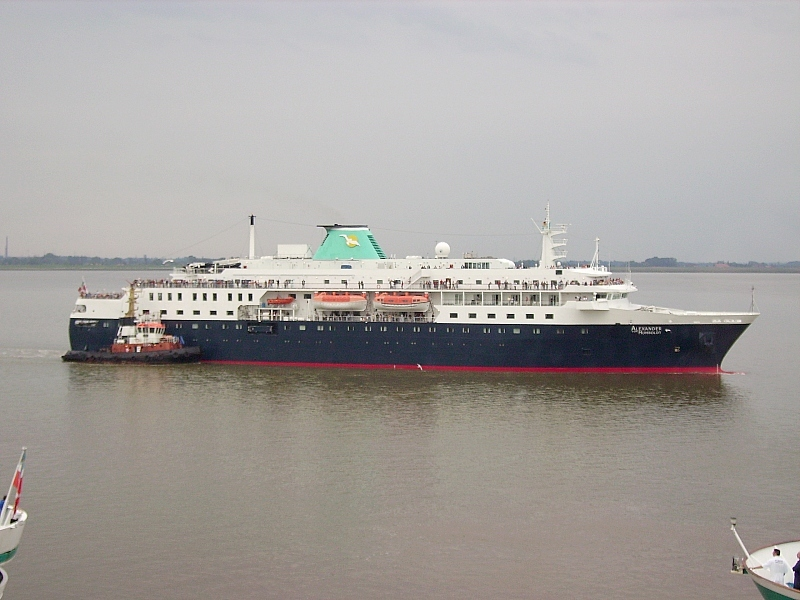
Alexander von Humbold after departure from Bremerhaven in 2007

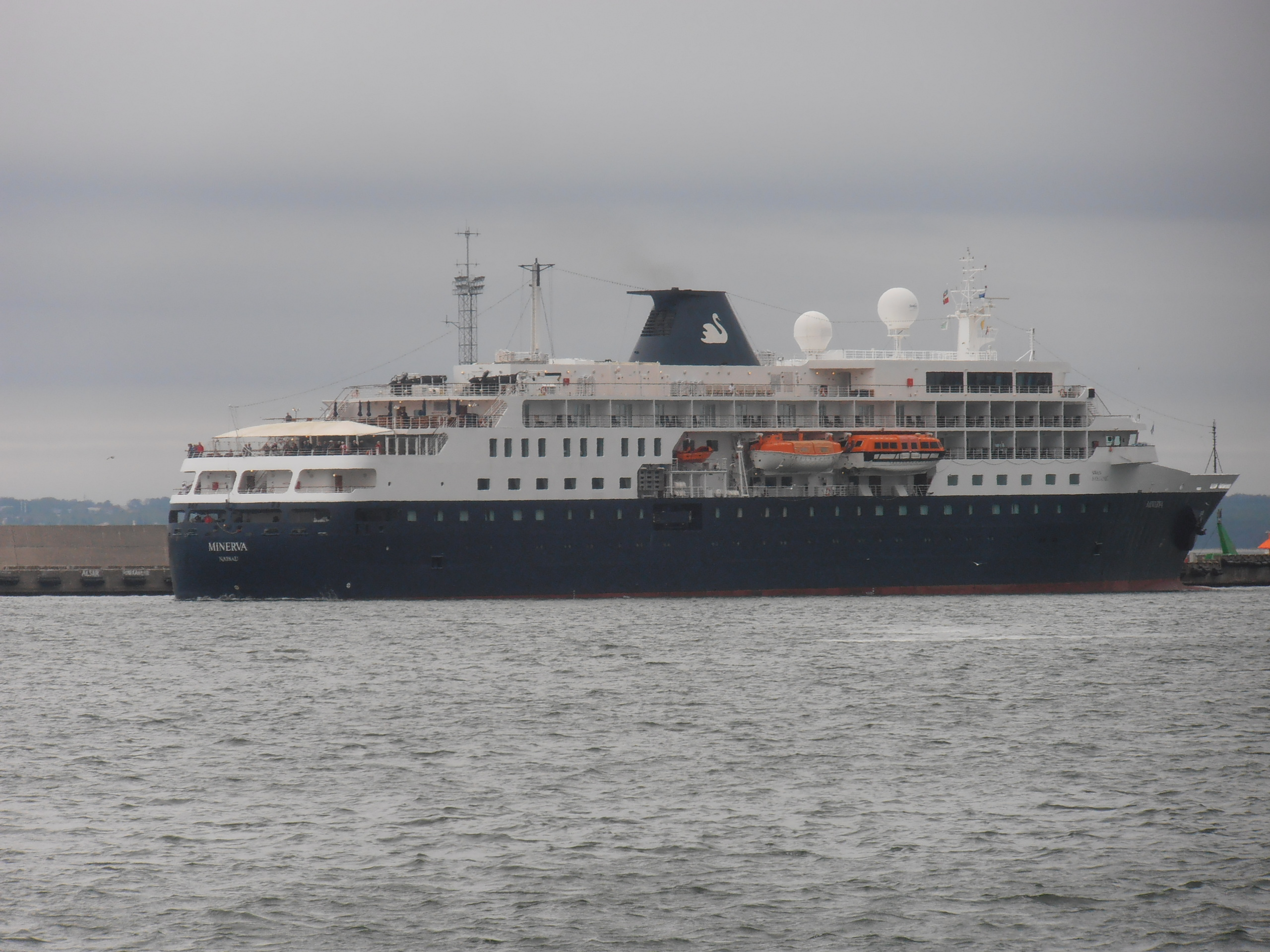
Minerva arriving at Tallinn in 2013

== Bibliography ==
- Ward, Douglas. Ocean Cruising and Cruise Ships 2005-2007. Berlitz.
