= Swan Hellenic =

British cruise line

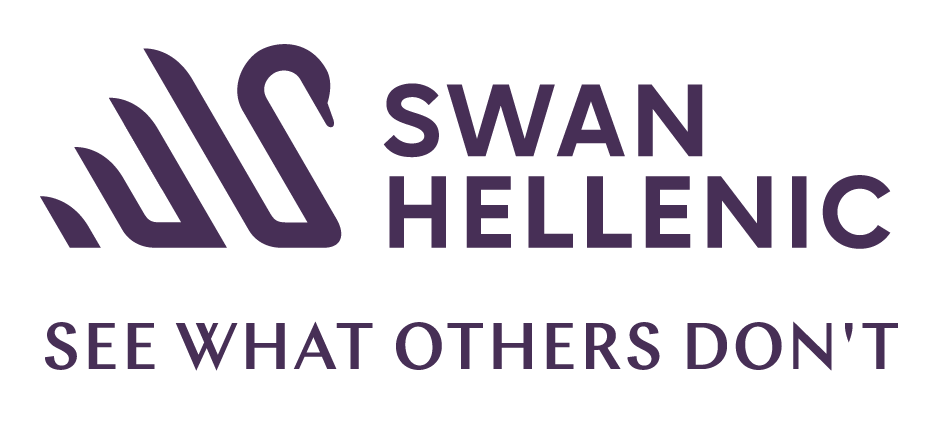
- Type: Private
- Industry: Hospitality
- Founded: 1950, as Swans Tour Agency
- Headquarters: Düsseldorf, Germany, Monaco
- Key people: Andrea Zito (CEO)
- Products: Cruises
- Website: www.swanhellenic.com

Swan Hellenic is a British cruise line specialising in expedition tours of historical or cultural interest aimed at the upper end of the cruise market. Swan Hellenic was first established as Swan's Tours in the 1950s as a tour operator carrying guests to historic sites.

In 1983, Swan Hellenic was acquired by P&O and became a subsidiary of Carnival Corporation & plc in 2003, but it ended operations in 2007 after Carnival discontinued the brand. Shortly after, All Leisure Holidays Group purchased and revived Swan Hellenic, but ended its operations in 2017. G Adventures acquired the brand later that year and planned to revive it for a second time in 2018, but sold the brand to a private group in 2020, which plans to resume Swan Hellenic's operations with its first-ever new-build ship in 2021.

== History ==
=== 1950s–1983: Swan's Tours ===
In the 1950s, a British travel agency, Swan's Tours, operated by a father and son (W.F. Swan and R.K. Swan), was asked to organise a tour for visitors interested in the antiquities of Greece. Archaeologist Sir Mortimer Wheeler served as a guest lecturer on the tours. The tours developed into a full programme of cruises, a concept known as "cultural cruising," in which well known academics, writers and clergymen were regularly featured as guest lecturers, both on board ships and on site. Swan's Tours prided itself on never repeating an itinerary and focused its business on touring classical sites in the Aegean Sea, around the coasts and islands of modern Greece and Turkey. It also visited classical and other ancient sites in north Africa (including Egypt) and the eastern Mediterranean.

In contrast to most commercial cruises offered at the time, in which the onboard entertainment was as important as the destinations visited, Swan's itineraries included almost-daily port calls for visits to historic sites, placing a high emphasis on the destination-oriented nature of its business. The operation was characterised by an English ethos of high culture, although it had an international following.

=== 1983–2007: As subsidiaries of P&O and Carnival ===
In 1983, P&O acquired Swan Hellenic from the Swan family. In 2003, it became a subsidiary of Carnival Corporation & plc after Carnival merged with P&O Princess Cruises. Under Carnival, the characteristically small 300-passenger ship Minerva was replaced in 2003 by the 600-passenger Minerva II. This led to criticism that the intimacy of the original cruise concept had been compromised.

On 7 April 2007, Carnival officially ceased Swan Hellenic's operations, and transferred Minerva II to the Princess Cruises fleet with the new name of Royal Princess. Swan Hellenic's demise was also compounded when Martin Randall Travel launched a series of cruises to fill the niche Swan Hellenic had left.

=== 2007–2017: First revival ===
On 15 March 2007, following news of Carnival folding the Swan Hellenic brand, Lord Sterling, the former chairman of P&O, announced that he was buying the Swan Hellenic brand and intended to relaunch the cruise line as soon as a suitable vessel could be located. All Leisure Holidays Group (ALG) subsequently acquired Swan Hellenic, joining it with sister brand Voyages of Discovery. The revived brand intended to begin operations with Minerva in May 2008, but the maiden voyage was later postponed after the ship's generators incurred problems. For her inaugural season, Minerva was scheduled to sail itineraries to the Baltic, Scandinavia and the Mediterranean Sea.

In January 2008, Swan Hellenic announced it would begin operating river cruises in 2009, offering itineraries sailing on the Danube from Vienna and on the Rhône from Lyon. The cruises were operated in partnership with A-Rosa Cruises, and were offered with packages that included land excursions and gratuity charges.

On 4 January 2017, it was reported that ALG had gone into administration, leaving 400 passengers abroad. The Civil Aviation Authority was instructed to repatriate them and future bookings for 13,000 others had been cancelled with pending refunds. The news came one day after the company announced it was cancelling its first itineraries of 2017, seen as a precursor to the ending of operations after profits had declined in recent years. That month, Grant Thornton's Eddie Williams, administrator to ALG, told BBC: "The cruise operations [of Swan Hellenic and Voyages of Discovery] have been significantly loss-making over a number of years and the ongoing cost of funding these operations by the tour operations has created significant cash issues for the entire group, which has ultimately led to the administration of all businesses." Following ALG's closure, Minerva, the only ship operating for Swan Hellenic, was laid up in Marseille awaiting sale.

=== 2017–present: Second revival ===
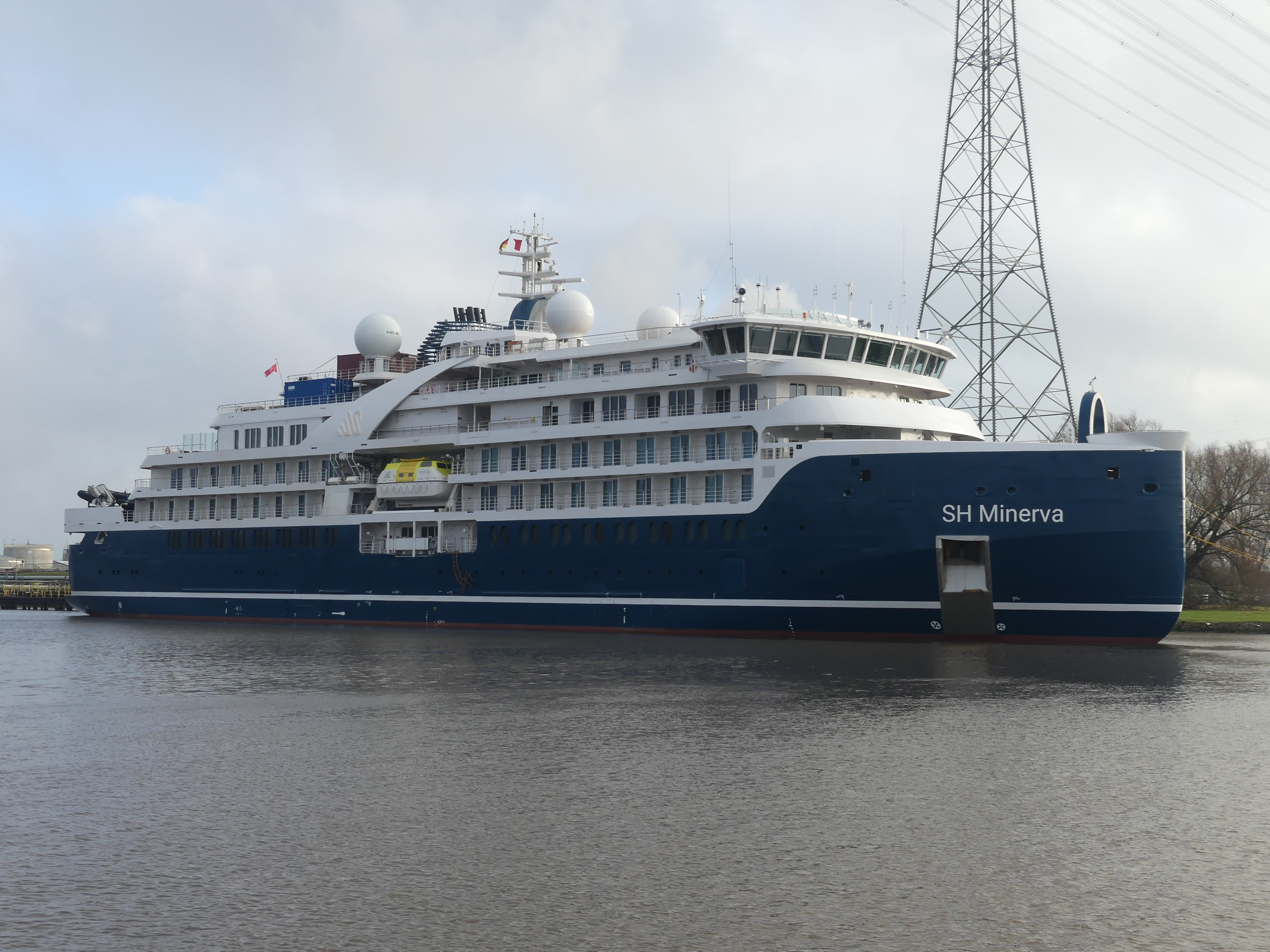
The SH Minerva a few days after the delivery

In February 2017, G Adventures announced it had acquired the Swan Hellenic brand, with the plan to restart operations in 2018. Itineraries were scheduled to be released that summer, though none were ultimately publicized and released for sale.

On 22 July 2020, a team led by former cruise industry executive Andrea Zito announced it had purchased Swan Hellenic from G Adventures. Zito, who had helped to broker the sale of Swan Hellenic to G Adventures in 2017 while working for V-Ships Leisure, said the revived brand will retain its British heritage and maintain the breadth of international offerings provided in the past by honing in on its focus on exploring different cultures across global destinations. The revived brand will launch with offices in Cyprus, Düsseldorf and Monaco.

Swan Hellenic is scheduled to begin operations with the brand's first-ever new-build, an expedition vessel built by Helsinki Shipyard in Hietalahti, scheduled for delivery in August 2021 for a November 2021 debut, with a sister ship slated for delivery in September 2022 for an October 2022 debut. The 152-passenger vessels are designed to sail in the polar regions and the tropics. The vessels, temporarily named Vega 1 and Vega 2, will be built to Polar Class 5, measure 113 metres (370 ft) long, 20,2 metres (66 ft) wide and have a maximum crew capacity of 120. The ownership of Swan Hellenic is split between three Cyprus-based companies (shareholders, also listed as shipowners) - Capstans Ltd, Valbridge Ltd, and Diamant Ltd.

==== SH Diana hunger strike ====
In November 2024, passengers on the cruise ship SH Diana went on hunger strike after the vessel skipped landings on an Antarctic and South Georgia cruise due to one of the ship's electric motors failing. The ship was a year old, but had to return to Ushuaia for repairs. The cruise cost at least £7,000-£10,000 per passenger, and Swan Hellenic offered passengers a 50% refund or a 65% future cruise credit that expired within two years, and stated that the compensation met legal requirements and that the itinerary change was made for safety reasons. This prompting dissatisfaction among some guests, many of whom called for full reimbursements.

== Fleet ==
=== Present fleet ===
Ship	Built	In service	Gross tonnage	Builder	Notes	Image
SH Minerva	2021	2021	10,617	Helsinki Shipyard	Named after the previous Minerva .	
SH Vega	2022	2022	10,617	Helsinki Shipyard	Project name Vega 2.	
SH Diana	2022	2023	10,617	Helsinki Shipyard		

back in service

=== Former fleet ===
Ship	Image	Built	Years in service	Gross tonnage	Former names	Notes
Miaoulis		1952	1954	1,714 GT		Originally built for the Greek Government and owned by Nomikos Lines.
Ankara		1927	1959–1974	6,178 GT		Built in the United States for New York and Miami S.S. Co., later Clyde Mallory Lines. Sold to Turkey in 1948. Chartered from Turkish Maritime Lines for a total of 105 cruises.
Orpheus		1948	1974–1996	4,145 GT	Munster, Theseus	Operated as the Liverpool to Dublin ferry Munster. Operated as Orpheus as charter from Epirotiki Line.
Minerva		1990	1996–2003; 2008–2017	12,892 GT	Saga Pearl, Explorer II, Alexander von Humboldt	Operated as Saga Pearl for Saga Cruises in summer 2003. Operated as Explorer II for Abercrombie & Kent from 2003 to 2005. Operated as Alexander von Humboldt for Phoenix Reisen from 2005 to 2008. Laid up in Marseille after ALG ended operations and sold in September 2017.
Minerva II		2001	2003–2007	30,277 GT	R Eight, Minerva II, Royal Princess, Adonia	Operated as R Eight for Renaissance Cruises in 2001. Operated as Royal Princess for Princess Cruises from 2007 to 2011. Operated as Adonia for P&O Cruises from 2011 to 2018. Began sailing as Azamara Pursuit for Azamara in August 2018.
