= Caledonian Sky =

Cruise ship

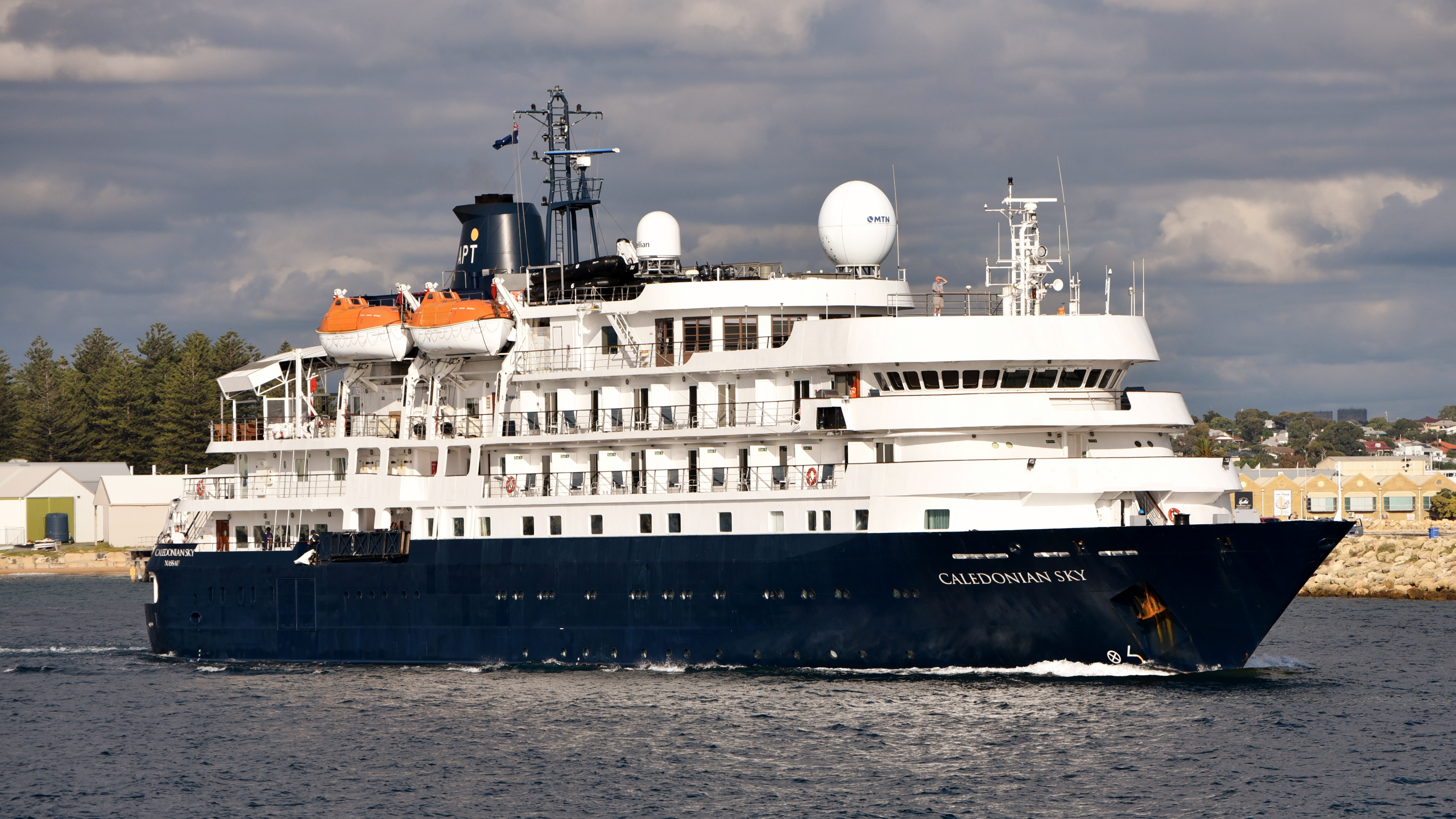
- Caledonian Sky in Fremantle, 2023

History
- Name: Blue Zephyr; Caledonian Sky; Sunrise; Hebridean Spirit; Capri; MegaStar Caprocorn; Sun Viva II; Renaissance Six
- Port of registry: 1991–1993: Palermo ?, Italy; 1993–2000: Monrovia, Liberia; 2000: Nassau, Bahamas; 2000–2009: Glasgow, United Kingdom; 2009–2011: Hamilton, Bermuda; 2011 onwards: Nassau, Bahamas
- Ordered: 1 July 1989
- Builder: Nuovi Cantieri Apuania, Carrara, Italy
- Yard number: 1145
- Laid down: 17 December 1987
- Launched: 24 March 1990
- Completed: 30 November 1991
- Acquired: 28 May 1991
- In service: 28 May 1991
- Identification: Call sign: C6ZO2; IMO number: 8802870; MMSI number: 311061100
- Status: In service

Caledonian Sky (IMO 8802870) is a cruise ship operated by Travelmarvel. It is one of eight ships originally built for Renaissance Cruises.

The ship was built in 1991 at Nuovi Cantieri Apuania in Italy, with yard number 1145, and a tonnage of 4280. It was initially named Renaissance Six. In 1998 it was sold to Sun Cruises, who renamed it Sun Viva II. In 2000 it was sold to Malaysian company Star Cruises, who renamed it MegaStar Capricorn. In 2001 it was sold to Hebridean Island Cruises, owned by Altnamara Shipping PLC. It was refitted like a country hotel, and renamed Hebridean Spirit. It was named at Leith, Scotland by the Princess Royal. Hebridean Island Cruises filed for administration in 2009.

It was later sold to Noble Caledonia (part of Australian tour company Australian Pacific Touring) and renamed Caledonian Sky. It was refurbished in 2016 and carries 100 passengers.

In December 2025, the Caledonian Sky was reported to have been sold to a Greek shipping company.

Caledenian Sky was rename Blue Zephyr by the Greek shipping company. (https://www.seatrade-cruise.com/ports-destinations/new-boutique-cruise-line-blue-zephyr-to-debut-in-greece)
