= Azamara =

Cruise company

Azamara Cruises
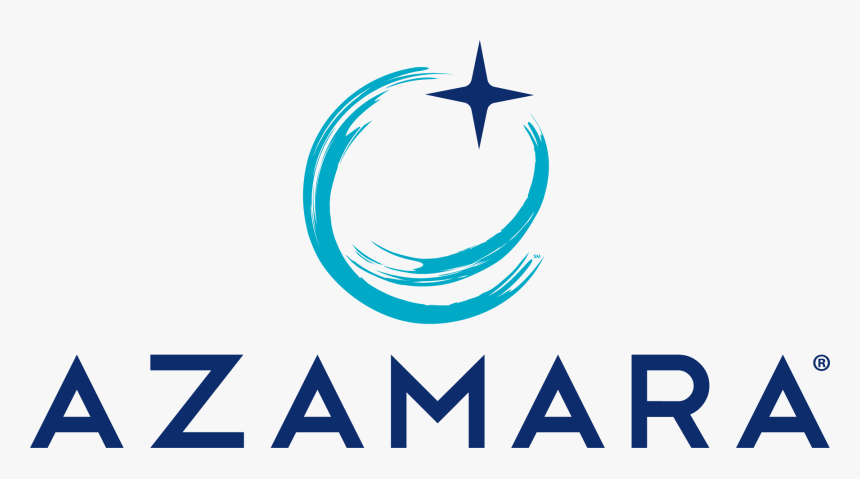
- Industry: Tourism
- Founded: 2007
- Founder: Royal Caribbean Group
- Headquarters: Miami, Florida, United States
- Area served: Worldwide
- Key people: Dondra Ritzenthaler (CEO)
- Products: Cruises
- Parent: Sycamore Partners
- Website: www.azamara.com

Azamara is a cruise line based in Miami, Florida, that operates four cruise ships on worldwide itineraries.

== History ==
Azamara Cruises was founded in 2007 after two R-class ships from Pullmantur Cruises that would have gone to Celebrity Cruises were transferred to the new company. The first ships of the company were the Azamara Quest and Azamara Journey.

In 2009 Azamara underwent a rebranding, being renamed to Azamara Club Cruises. Between 2012 and 2013 the Azamara Quest and Azamara Journey were renovated and in 2018 the company acquired the Adonia from P&O Cruises, renaming it to Azamara Pursuit.

The company was founded by Royal Caribbean who wanted to diversify its operations. In 2021, the company was sold to a private investment group.

The ships were extensively renovated from 2012 to 2013 and 2018, respectively.

Azamara currently operates four ships. They belong to the eight R-class ships that were built for Renaissance Cruises between 1997 and 2001. The Azamara Quest and Azamara Journey both entered service in 2000 under the original names R Six and R Seven. In March 2018, Adonia was also taken over from P&O Cruises and renamed Azamara Pursuit.

Each of the ships can carry a maximum of 686 passengers. All ships sail under the flag of the Marshall Islands. Azamara offers cruises with the ships worldwide.

In January 2021, Royal Caribbean announced that it would sell Azamara to Sycamore Partners in the first quarter of 2021. The sale was completed in March 2021. The acquisition of another ship, the Pacific Princess, a sister ship to the other ships in the fleet, was also announced. The ship was handed over in March 2021 and was officially renamed Azamara Onward on May 2, 2022.

In May 2024, Dondra Ritzenthaler became the CEO of Azamara Cruises.

== Fleet ==
The Azamara ships were built in 1999–2001 for Renaissance Cruises as a part of their R class.

| Ship | Built | Builder | Entered service for Azamara | Gross Tonnage | Flag | Notes | Image |
|---|---|---|---|---|---|---|---|
| Azamara Journey | 2000 | Chantiers de l'Atlantique | 2007 | 30,277 tons | Malta | Previously R Six, Blue Star and Blue Dream. | |
| Azamara Quest | 2000 | Chantiers de l'Atlantique | 2007 | 30,277 tons | Malta | Previously R Seven, Delphin Renaissance and Blue Moon. | |
| Azamara Pursuit | 2001 | Chantiers de l'Atlantique | 2018 | 30,277 tons | Malta | Previously R Eight, Minerva II, Royal Princess and Adonia. | |
| Azamara Onward | 1999 | Chantiers de l'Atlantique | 2022 | 30,277 tons | Malta | Previously R Three, Pacific Princess. Was renamed Azamara Onward on May 2, 2022. | |
