= MS Nautica =

Cruise ship

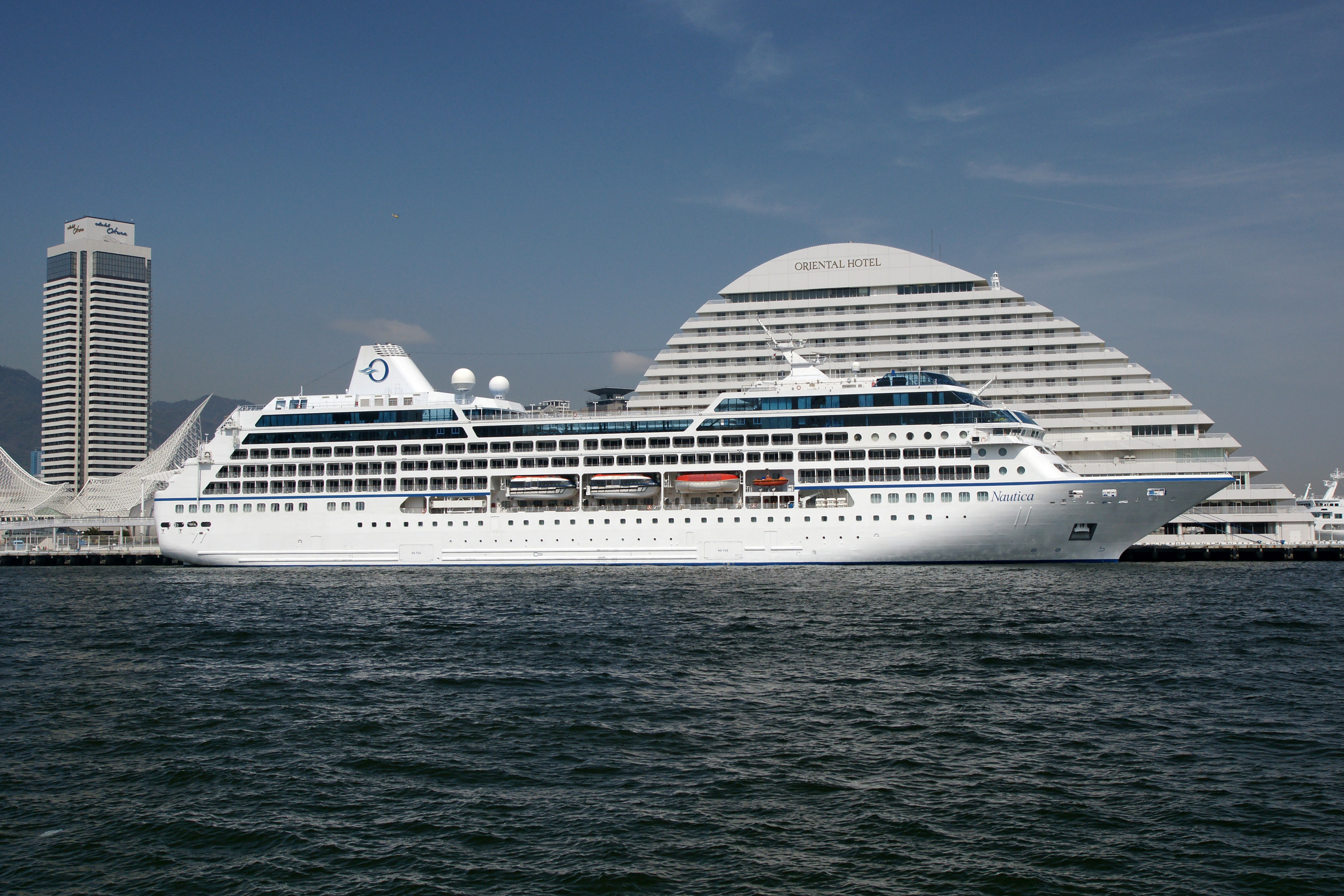
- MS Nautica at Kobe harbour, March 2009

History
- Name: 2000–2004: R Five; 2004 onwards: Nautica
- Owner: 2000–2001: Renaissance Cruises; 2001–2006: Cruiseinvest; 2006 onwards: Oceania Cruises
- Operator: 2000–2001: Renaissance Cruises; 2001–2002: laid up; 2002–2004: Pullmantur Cruises; 2005 onwards: Oceania Cruises
- Port of registry: 2000–2001: Monrovia, Liberia; 2001 onwards: Majuro, Marshall Islands
- Builder: Chantiers de l'Atlantique, Saint-Nazaire, France
- Cost: £150 million
- Yard number: P31
- Laid down: 22 March 1999
- Launched: 31 July 1999
- Completed: 7 January 2000
- Acquired: 29 January 2000
- In service: 1 February 2000
- Identification: Call sign: V7DM4; IMO number: 9200938; MMSI number: 538001665
- Status: In Service

General characteristics
- Class & type: R-class cruise ship (as built); Regatta-class cruise ship (currently)
- Tonnage: 30,277 GT
- Length: 181.00 m (593 ft 10 in)
- Beam: 25.46 m (83 ft 6 in)
- Draught: 5.95 m (19 ft 6 in)
- Depth: 8.40 m (27 ft 7 in)
- Decks: 11 (9 passenger accessible)
- Installed power: 4 × Wärtsilä 12V32 diesels; combined 13,500 kW (18,100 hp)
- Propulsion: 2 propellers
- Speed: 18 kn (33.34 km/h)
- Capacity: 684 passengers (lower berths); 824 passengers (all berths); 2,948 t DWT
- Crew: 386

MS Nautica is a cruise ship built for Renaissance Cruises as part of their R class. As part of their Regatta Class, Nautica is now owned and operated by Oceania Cruises. She was built in 2000 by the Chantiers de l'Atlantique shipyard in Saint-Nazaire, France, for Renaissance Cruises as MS R Five. She sailed for Pullmantur Cruises between 2002 and 2004 before entering service with her current owners in 2005.

The Nautica was at Greenock Ocean Terminal when Storm Ali struck on 20 September 2018. At 11:00 the ship's mooring lines parted and it broke free, getting blown into the Tail of the Bank area of the firth where tugs came to its assistance. The 478 passengers and 26 crew who were onshore at the time were looked after until the ship returned to its berth in the evening.

== Concept and construction ==
R Five was the fifth ship in a series of eight identical cruise ships built between 1998 and 2001 by Chantiers de l'Atlantique at Saint-Nazaire, France, for Renaissance Cruises. Her keel was laid on 22 March 1999 and she was launched from drydock on 31 July 1999. Following fitting out, the R Five was delivered to Renaissance Cruises on 29 January 2000.

== Service history ==
On 1 February 2000, the R Five entered service with Renaissance Cruises on cruises in the Mediterranean. She stayed in service until 25 September 2001, when Renaissance Cruises was declared bankrupt due to financial difficulties caused by the September 11 attacks.

The R Five was laid up at Gibraltar alongside six of her sister ships. In December 2001, she was sold to the France-based Cruiseinvest and was moved to Marseille, France, together with her sisters for a further lay-up.

The R Five was chartered to the Spain-based Pullmantur Cruises for cruising for the Spanish market from June 2002. In service with Pullmantur, she was marketed under the name "Blue Dream", but her registered name remained unchanged. She sailed out of Brazilian port during the Northern Hemisphere winter seasons as a part of Pullmantur's joint service with CVC. R Five left service with Pullmantur in 2004.

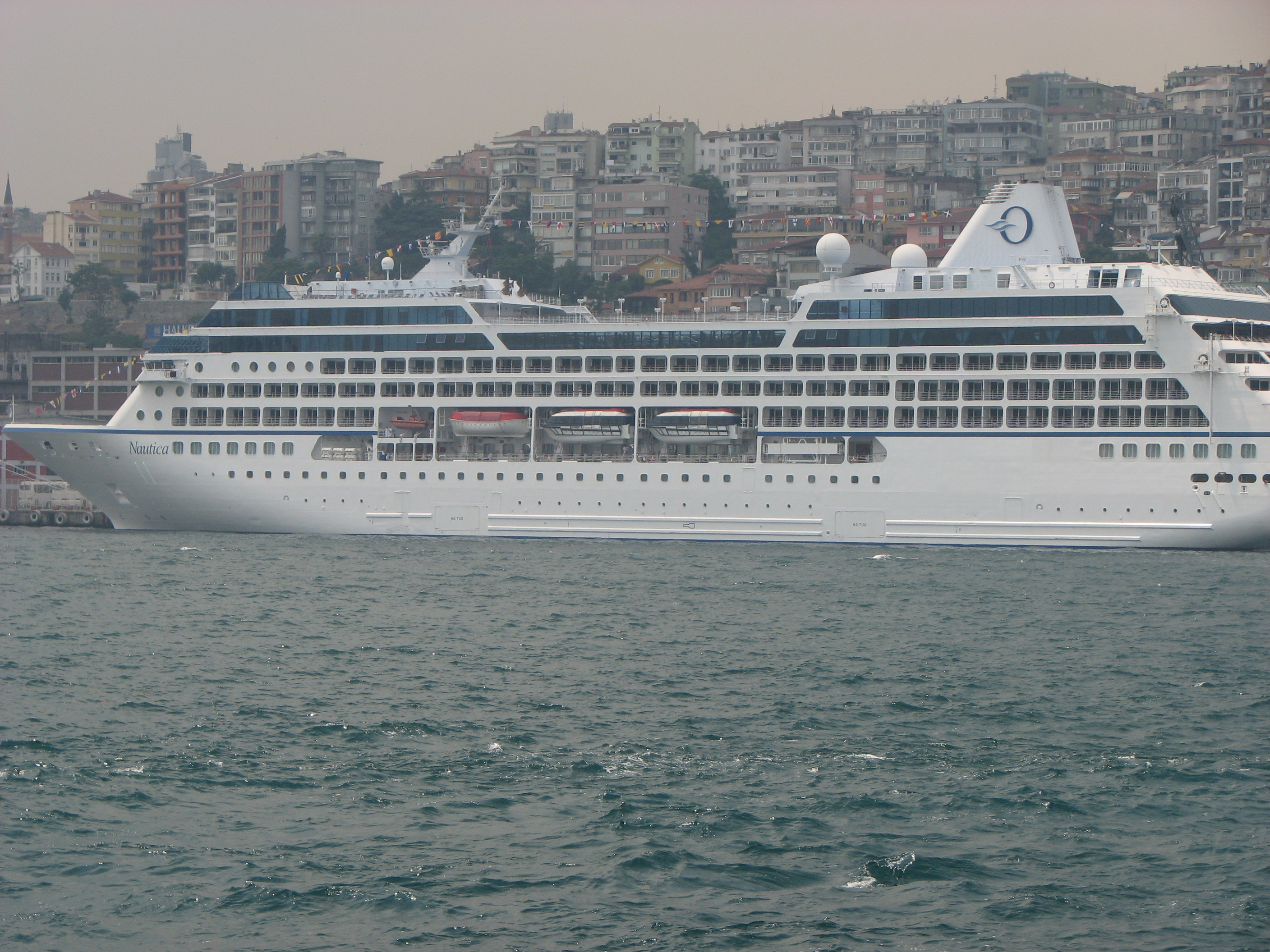
MS Nautica at Istanbul

The R Five re-entered service in November 2005 when she was chartered to Oceania Cruises and renamed Nautica. On 30 November 2008, the Nautica was sailing from Safaga, Egypt, to Salah, Oman, on the Maritime Safety Protection Area established in the Gulf of Aden due to persistent pirate attacks on the area, when at approximately 9:28 AM UTC+3, the ship encountered two Somali pirate skiffs. Captain Jurica Brajcic ordered the ship to take evasive manoeuvres and to sail away at flank speed. The Nautica was able to outrun her attackers although the ship was fired at eight times. None of the 684 passengers or 401 crew on board were injured in the attack. Following the attack, the Nautica proceeded normally to her next scheduled port of call.

Nautica is scheduled to undergo a significant renovation in June 2020 as a part of the company's $100 million OceaniaNEXT program.

On 22 April 2026, it was announced that, as part of the ongoing OceaniaNEXT fleet upgrade program, Nautica will undergo a bow-to-stern refurbishment, including new suites, staterooms, and guest amenities. Guest capacity will be reduced to under 500, and the ship will operate longer voyages and around-the-world itineraries. She is expected to relaunch as Oceania Aurelia in late 2027.
