= Azamara Onward =

Cruise ship

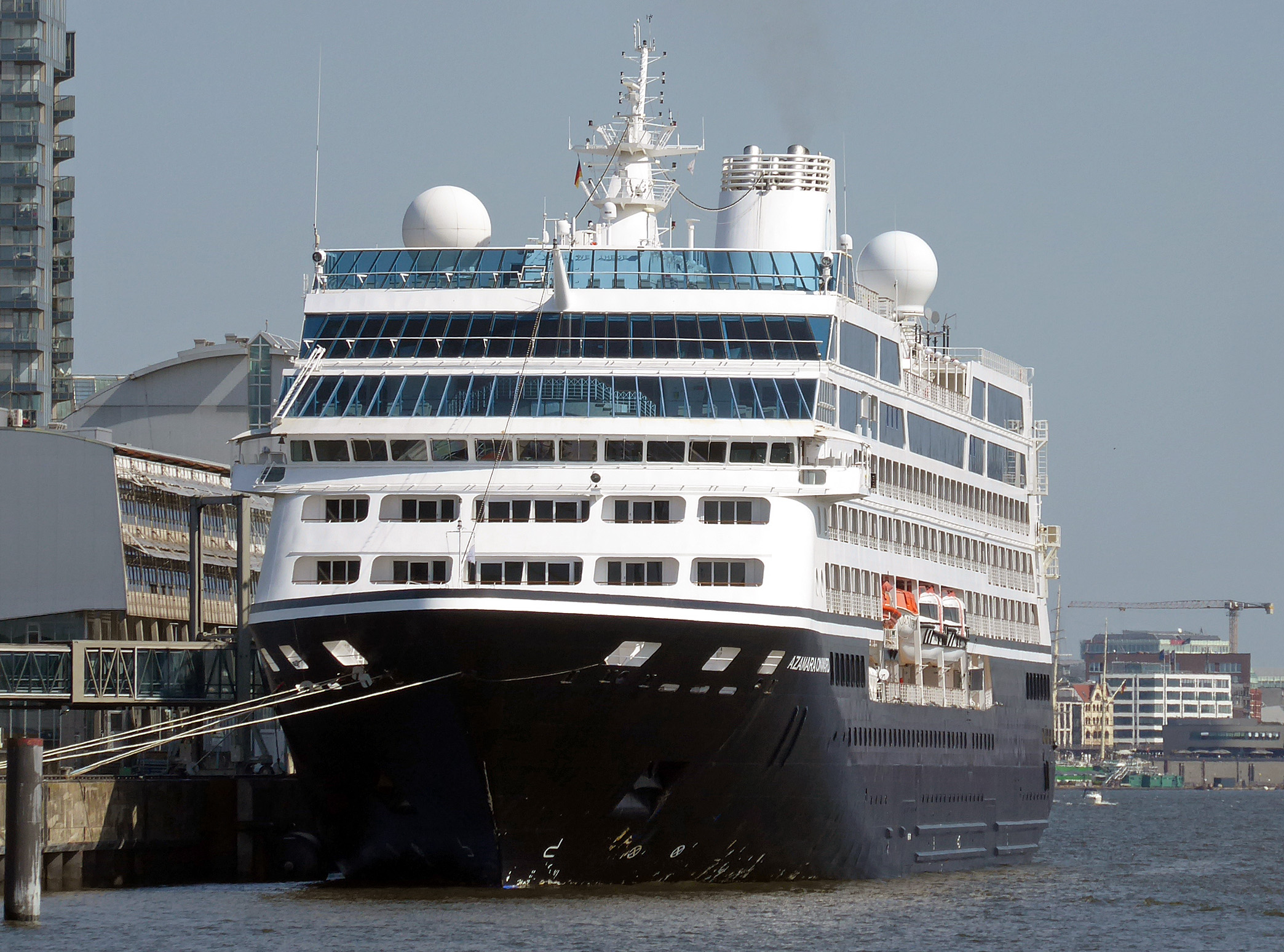
- Azamara Onward in Hamburg, Germany, 2024

History
- Name: 1999–2002: R Three; 2002–2021: Pacific Princess; 2021–2022: P Prince; 2022–present: Azamara Onward
- Owner: 1999–2001: Renaissance Cruises; 2002–2021: Carnival Corporation & plc; 2022-present: Sycamore Partners
- Operator: 1999–2001: Renaissance Cruises; 2001–2002: laid up; 2002–2021: Princess Cruises; 2021–2022: laid up; 2022–present: Azamara Cruises
- Port of registry: 1999–2002: Liberia; 2002–2006: Gibraltar; 2006–2022: Bermuda; 2022–present: Malta
- Builder: Chantiers de l'Atlantique, St. Nazaire, France
- Cost: £150 million
- Yard number: N31
- Launched: August 1999
- Acquired: 1999
- In service: December 1999
- Identification: Call sign ZCDS3; IMO number: 9187887; MMSI number: 310504000
- Status: In service

General characteristics
- Class & type: R-class cruise ship
- Tonnage: 30,277 GT; 2,700 DWT
- Length: 181.00 m (593 ft 10 in)
- Beam: 25.46 m (83 ft 6 in)
- Draught: 5.80 m (19 ft 0 in)
- Decks: 9 (passenger accessible)
- Installed power: 4 × Wärtsilä 12V32; 13,500 kW (combined)
- Propulsion: 2 propellers
- Speed: 18 knots (33 km/h; 21 mph)
- Capacity: 688 passengers (lower berths); 826 passengers (all berths)
- Crew: 373

MS Azamara Onward, formerly R Three and Pacific Princess, is a cruise ship owned and operated by Azamara Cruises since 2022. She was built in 1999 by the Chantiers de l'Atlantique shipyard in Saint-Nazaire, France for Renaissance Cruises. In 2002, following the failure of Renaissance Cruises, the ship was sold to Princess Cruises and renamed Pacific Princess. On 21 January 2021, Carnival announced the ship had been sold to an unnamed buyer, later revealed to be Azamara Cruises.

== Construction and career ==
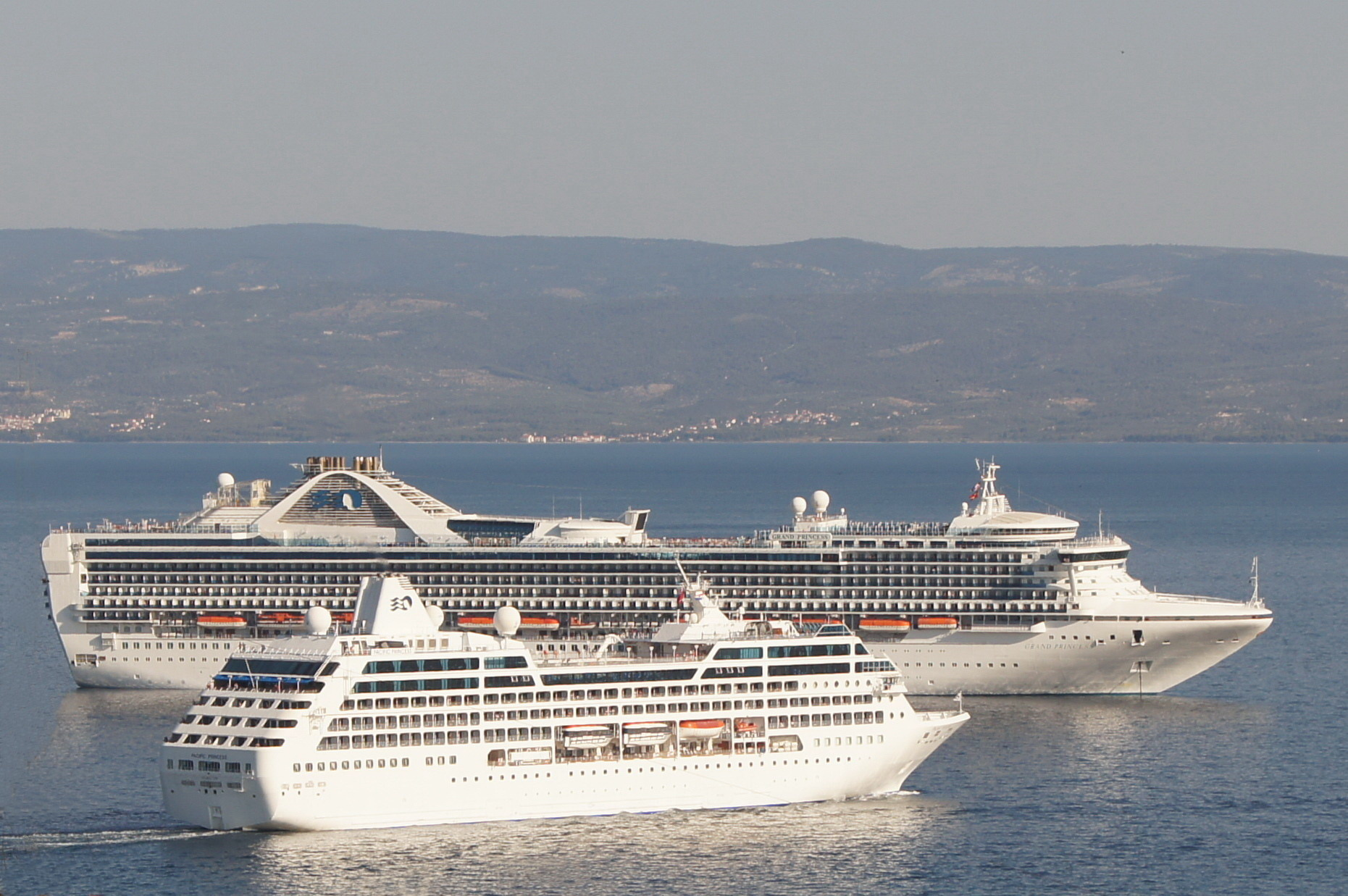
Pacific Princess and Grand Princess in Split, Croatia in 2011.

=== R Three ===
The vessel first entered operation in 1999, with Renaissance Cruises. The ship was not owned by the company, with possession instead residing with a group of French investors, who leased the ship to the company. In late 2001, the entire Renaissance fleet was seized by creditors.

=== Pacific Princess ===
In late 2002, Princess Cruises chartered the R Three, along with sister ship R Four (previously Ocean Princess and now MS Sirena). Both vessels entered operation by the end of 2002. The charter terminated at the end of 2004, at which time, both vessels were purchased by Princess Cruises. Gabi Hollows renamed the ship Pacific Princess in Sydney on 8 December 2002, named after the earlier Pacific Princess which served as the ship featured in the television series, The Love Boat.

From 2002 to 2007, Pacific Princess was operated by P&O Cruises Australia from November to April every year. While From May to October she would be operated by Princess. This agreement was maintain until 2007 when Regal Princess was transferred to P&O and became Pacific Dawn. The ship was the subject of a state aid decision by the European Commission: Decision 2006/219, in which the European Commission held a discussion on R Three and R Four, regarding the two ships' original purpose of intending to support local tourism in French Polynesia, and whether or not the re-deployments of the two ships beyond the French Polynesia region were a misuse of Commission-provided development aid. The conclusion presides that France unlawfully breached the treaty that governed the regulations surrounding development aid when the ships were redeployed outside of the local region, but with the devastating economic effects (force majeure) of the September 11 attacks and the fact that the expectations of local development impact have now otherwise been met, the ships' re-deployments were allowed and the development aid given to France was still rendered lawfully used.

Pacific Princess has often been deployed on itineraries servicing more exotic locales or ports within areas unreachable by larger vessels. These itineraries have included the World Cruise itineraries of more than 100 days. As of October 2019, Pacific Princess is operating voyages within the Mediterranean before embarking on the 2020 World Cruise. She was scheduled to return to Alaska in the summer of 2020, sailing between Vancouver and Whittier, before returning to the South Pacific for itineraries serving French Polynesia and Oceania.

In January 2021, Carnival announced the sale of the ship.

== Incidents ==
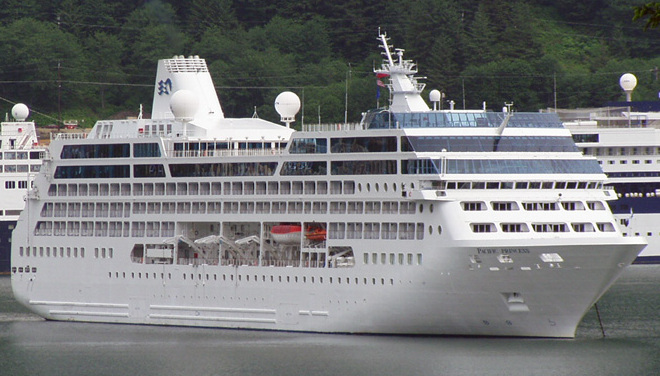
Pacific Princess in Juneau, Alaska

On 14 October 2016, Pacific Princess collided with the breakwater at Nice, Alpes-Maritimes, France and was holed below the waterline. There were no injuries amongst the 669 passengers and 382 crew.

On 25 August 2018, Pacific Princess rescued three fisherman from a sunken trawler in the North Sea, about 25 miles (40 km) north-east of Great Yarmouth.

=== Coronavirus quarantine ===
During the COVID-19 pandemic in 2020, Pacific Princess was refused permission to dock at numerous destinations including Bali, Singapore, Phuket, Thailand, and Sri Lanka, even though there were no confirmed cases on board. The ship was allowed to dock in Perth, Australia on 21 March and most passengers disembarked. Those who were unable to fly home remained on the ship which was heading to Los Angeles. The company stated that 115 passengers were still on board and that they had no confirmed cases of COVID-19. On 13 April 2020, 4 passengers were allowed to disembark in Honolulu, Hawaii. The last passengers disembarked when the ship returned to Los Angeles on 20 April.

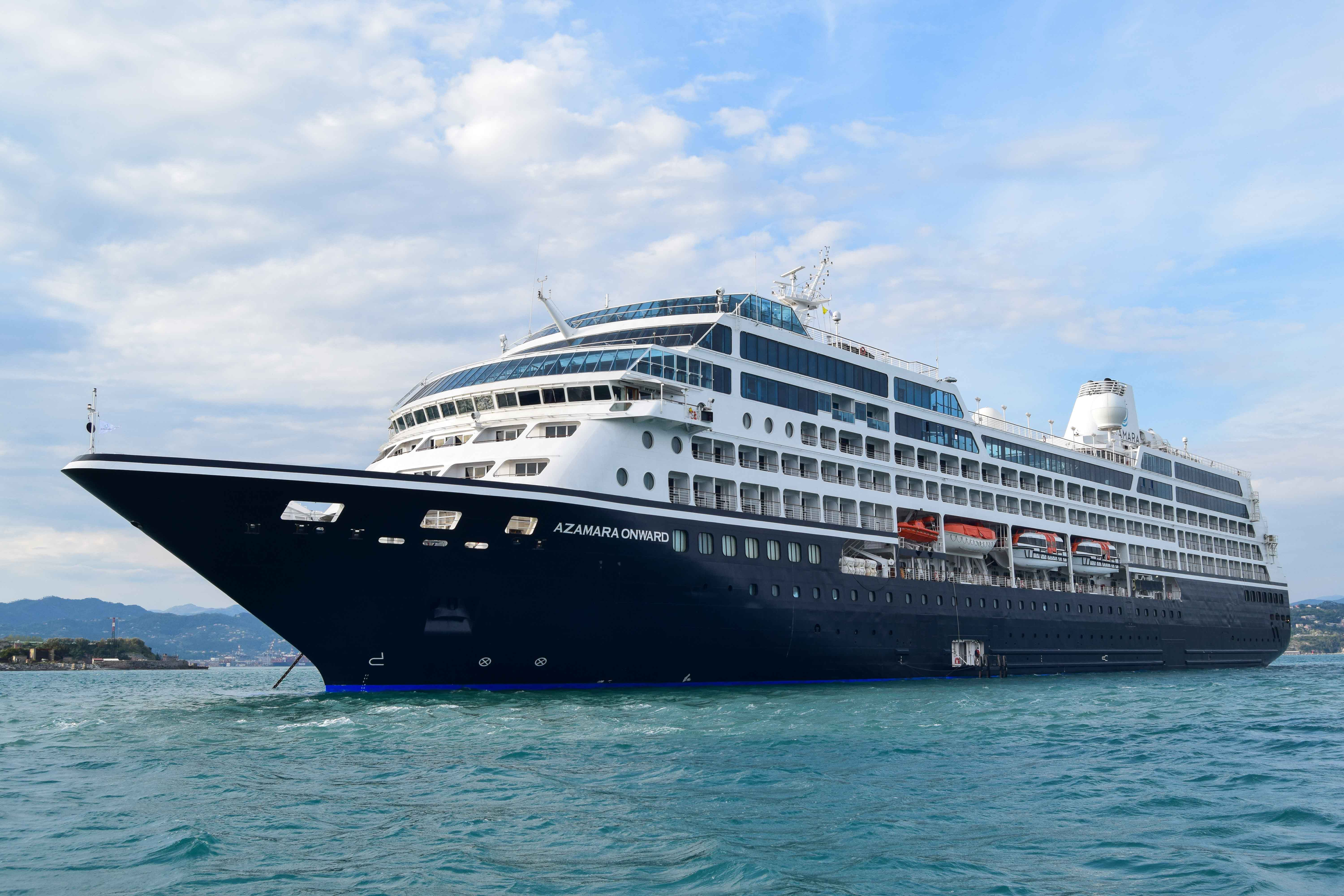
Azamara Onward in Porto Venere, Italy on 30th of April 2022
