= King George V Dock, Glasgow =

Coordinates: 55.86888°N 4.35256°W

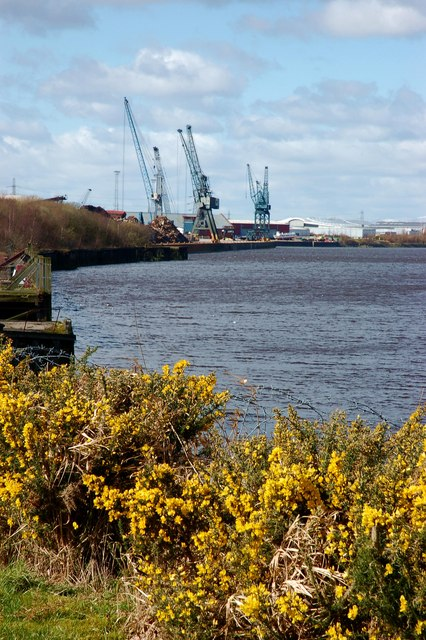
View of the docks at the River Clyde

King George V Dock is a dock for ocean-going vessels operated by the Clyde Port Authority in the Shieldhall (Govan) area of Glasgow. It is located near Braehead in Renfrewshire and lies on the boundary between the council areas of Renfrewshire and the City of Glasgow.

A large single basin with unrestricted entry, it opened in 1931 to accommodate the larger vessels then beginning to service the Clyde and was named after George V, the reigning monarch. It is the largest dock on the Upper Clyde, as well as the only operational one within Glasgow's city boundary. The dock currently deals with dry bulk cargoes, including animal feeds, grains, chemicals and industrial equipment, and offers easy transfer of goods to the M8 motorway and the national rail network via the remaining stub of the Glasgow and Renfrew District Railway and the Inverclyde Line.
