= MS Tropicale =

Cruise ship built 1982

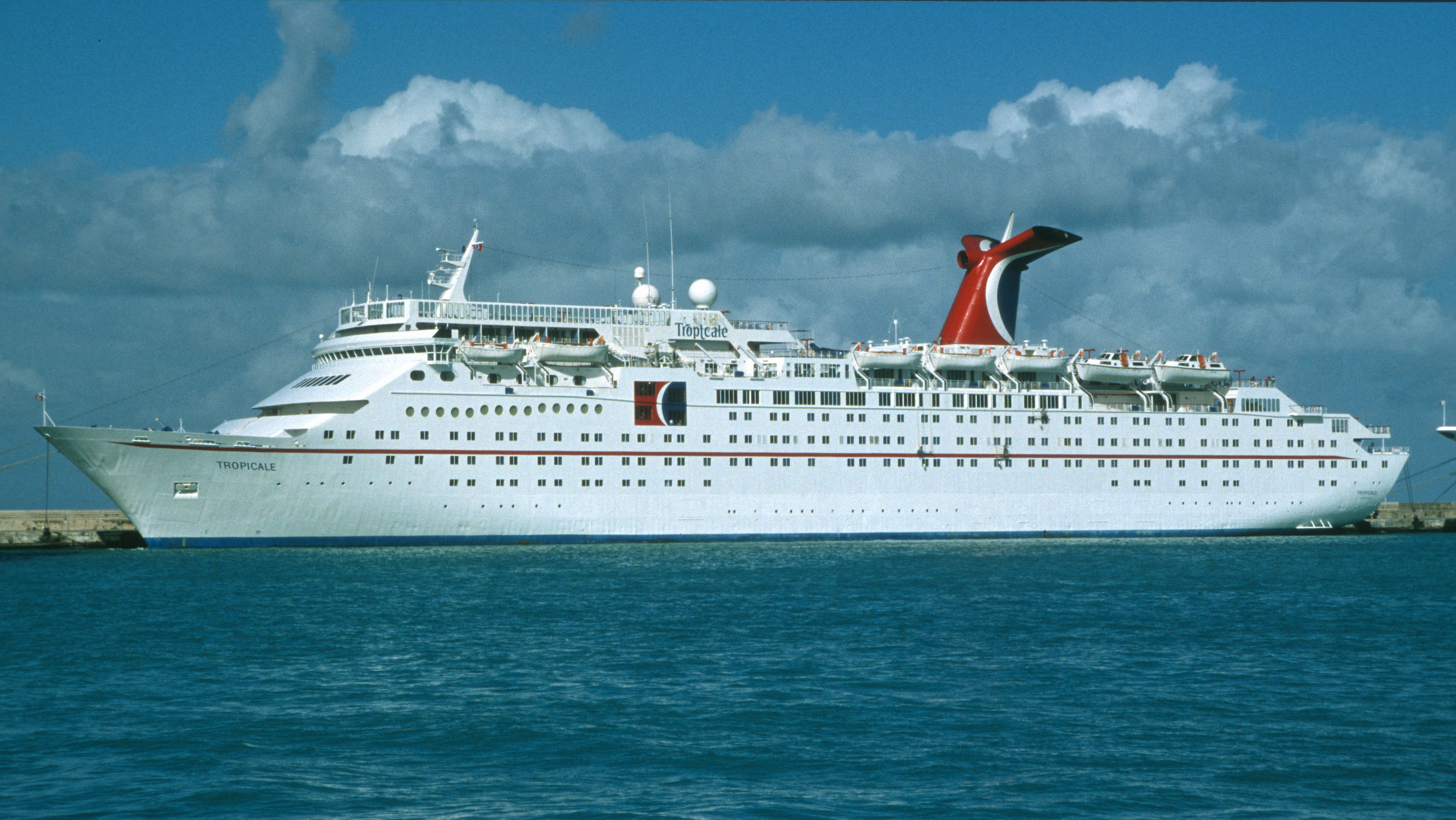
- Tropicale in Martinique, December 1996

History
- Name: 1981–2000: Tropicale; 2000–2005: Costa Tropicale; 2005–2008: Pacific Star; 2008–2020: Ocean Dream; 2020–2021: Dream
- Owner: 1981–1991: AVL Marine Inc (Aalborg Værft); 1991–2000: Carnival Cruise Lines; 2000–2005: Costa Cruises; 2005–2008: P&O Cruises Australia; 2008–2012: Pullmantur Cruises; 2012-2020: Peace Boat
- Operator: 1981–2000: Carnival Cruise Line; 2000–2005: Costa Cruises; 2005–2008: P&O Cruises Australia; 2008–2012: Pullmantur Cruises; 2012–2020: Peace Boat
- Port of registry: 1981–2000: Monrovia, Liberia; 2000–2005: Panama City, Panama; 2005–2008: London, United Kingdom; 2008–2012: Valletta, Malta; 2012–2020: Panama City, Panama; 2020–2021: Moroni, Comoros
- Builder: Aalborg Værft, Ålborg, Denmark
- Cost: $100 million
- Yard number: 234
- Launched: 31 October 1980
- Acquired: 4 December 1981
- Maiden voyage: 1982
- In service: 16 January 1982
- Out of service: 2021
- Identification: Call sign: D6A2791; IMO number: 7915096; MMSI number: 620780000
- Fate: Scrapped at Alang, India, in 2021
- Notes: First newbuild ship for Carnival Cruise Lines.

General characteristics (as built)
- Type: Cruise ship
- Tonnage: 36,674 GT; 6,654 DWT
- Length: 202.76 m (665 ft 3 in)
- Beam: 26.45 m (86 ft 9 in)
- Draught: 7.00 m (23 ft 0 in)
- Installed power: 2 × Sulzer 7RND68M; 19,570 kW (combined)
- Propulsion: Two propellers
- Speed: 21 knots (39 km/h; 24 mph)
- Capacity: 1,022 passengers

General characteristics (as Pacific Star)
- Type: Cruise ship
- Tonnage: 35,190 GT
- Decks: 10 (passenger accessible)
- Capacity: 1,412 passengers (maximum)
- Crew: 550

MS Tropicale (also known as Costa Tropicale, Pacific Star, and Ocean Dream) was a cruise ship that entered service in 1982, and was one of the pioneering cruise ships in the modernization of the cruise industry. She was Carnival Cruises Line's first newly built ship, initially operating mainly in the Mexican Riviera and the Caribbean.

Tropicale was transferred to the Costa fleet in July 2001, and renamed the Costa Tropicale. The Costa Tropicale was transferred to P&O Cruises Australia in 2005 as the Pacific Star in December of that year. In March 2008, P&O Cruises Australia sold the Pacific Star to Pullmantur Cruises becoming the Ocean Dream. After Pullmantur, the ship's final operator was Peace Boat, sailing as the Ocean Dream until 2020. After 38 years of service, the former Tropicale was scrapped in January 2021.

== History ==
=== Carnival Cruise Line ===
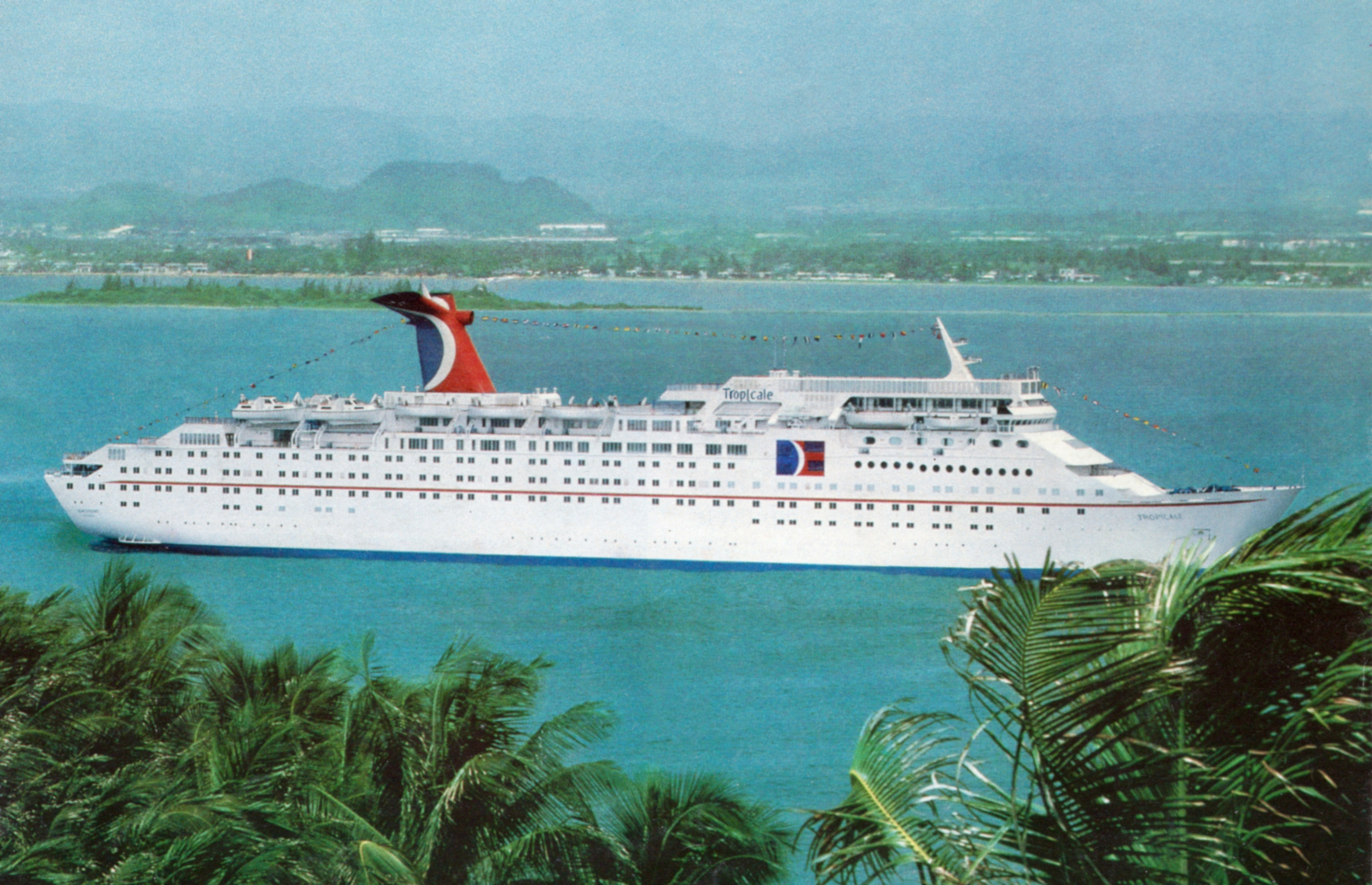
Tropicale during the 1980s or the 1990s

The vessel was originally intended to be constructed in Japan, after Carnival's most recent acquired ship the TSS Festivale had received a major refit there. However, the construction ended up being awarded to the Danish shipyard Aalborg Vaerft. The Tropicale was launched in 1981, and was the first cruise ship custom-built for the company, introducing Carnival's characteristic winged funnel, designed by Joe Farcus. The interiors were also designed by Farcus, evolving Carnival's signature themed lounges.

As the company expanded and acquired larger ships, Carnival decided that Tropicale would be their 'test ship' for new cruise destinations, and as such was the first Carnival ship to be based in San Juan, New Orleans, Alaska, and Tampa. In 1985 the vessel appeared in an episode of The A-Team called "Judgement Day (part 2)". The ship also appeared in a season four episode of Growing Pains.

On September 19, 1999, the vessel's engine room caught fire en route from Cozumel to Tampa. While disabled in the Gulf of Mexico, the ship was nearly struck by Tropical Storm Harvey. One of the engines was restarted and the ship was able to get out of the way of the storm before it hit. No crew or guests were injured during the two days the Tropicale spent without propulsion. The vessel was slated to replace Dolphin IV of Cape Canaveral Cruise Line in 2001, but before Carnival Tropicale could enter service, the vessel was transferred to Carnival Corporations division of Costa Cruises, where she was renamed Costa Tropicale.

=== Costa Cruises & P&O Australia ===
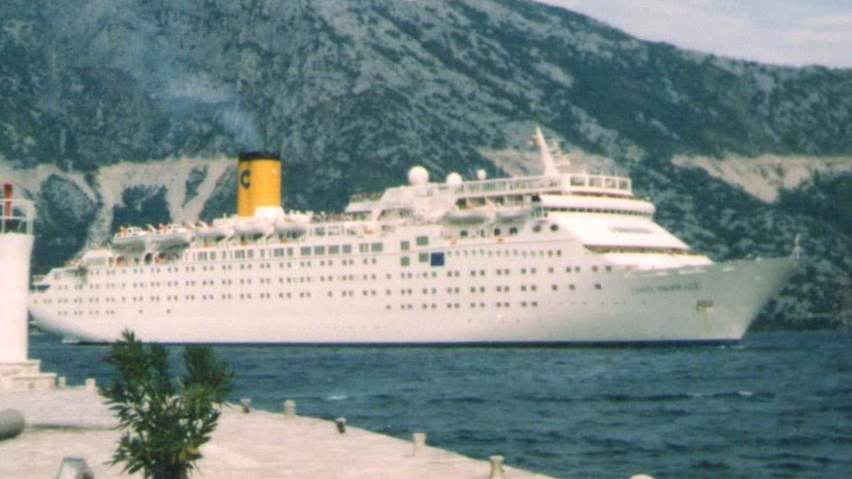
Costa Tropicale at Kotor, Montenegro in 2003

The vessel underwent refits at Genoa over the course of 2001 and 2002, removing the iconic winged funnel, and replacing with the traditional Costa upright yellow funnel design. The interiors were completely renovated, transforming the Carnival themed lounges into the contemporary Italian style seen on other Costa ships. Costa Tropicale served with the company until 2005, when replacement by larger, more modern cruise ships prompted a transfer to another Carnival Corporation division: P&O Cruises Australia, where the vessel again underwent a major refit in Palermo, Italy and was renamed Pacific Star. She was formerly Queensland's latest cruise liner, based in Brisbane, performing cruises along the Tropical Queensland coast, to various islands in the South Pacific, New Caledonia, and to New Zealand.

=== Pullmantur Cruises ===
In 2008 the Pacific Star was sold to Pullmantur Cruises and renamed Ocean Dream following a refit in Singapore. In June 2009, an outbreak of swine flu occurred about the Ocean Dream during a cruise around Central and South America. The ship docked in Margarita, Venezuela to allow its Venezuelan passengers to disembark, before heading to Aruba, where the remaining passengers were able to leave the ship. An earlier report had suggested that the ship had been placed in quarantine, however, the ship's owners Pullmantur later denied that this was the case.

=== Peace Boat ===
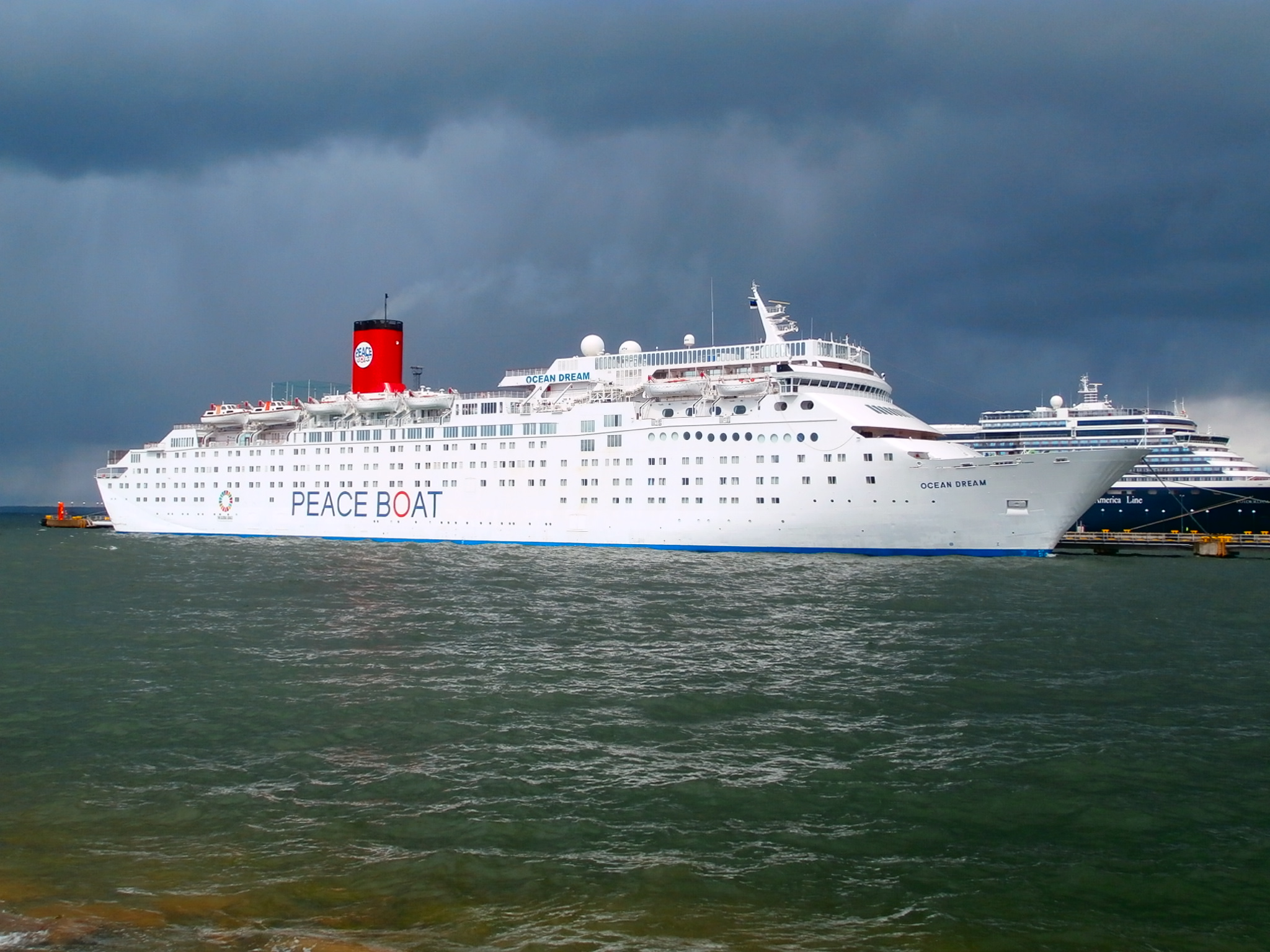
Ocean Dream in the Harbour of Tallinn, Estonia in 2017

In 2012 Ocean Dream left the Pullmantur Cruises fleet, and was chartered to Peace Boat, replacing the Oceanic.

In September 2020 Cruise Capital informed according to Hong Kong Cruise Society, Peace Boat was to remove two ships, Ocean Dream and Zenith, from service, replacing them with one larger ship, chartered and renamed Pacific World from Spring 2021. Specifications released by Peace Boat suggested the new ship was Sun Princess, which was the only vessel to have done such deployments. Later that month, Carnival announced that they had sold Sun Princess.

Ocean Dream was sold for scrap and beached at Alang, India, on 1 January 2021. On March 27, the scrapping process began.

== Gallery ==
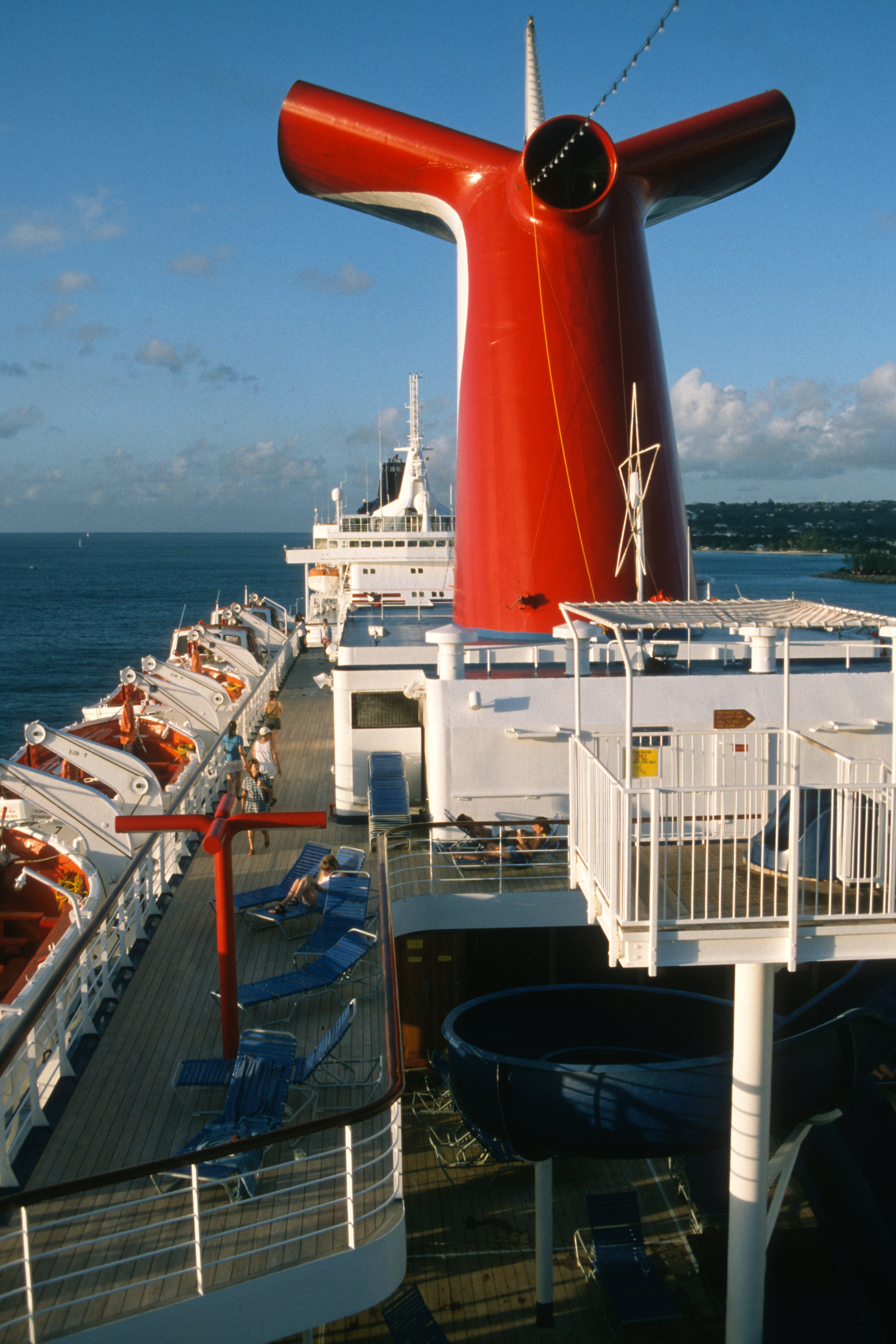
Tropicale's funnel in 1996

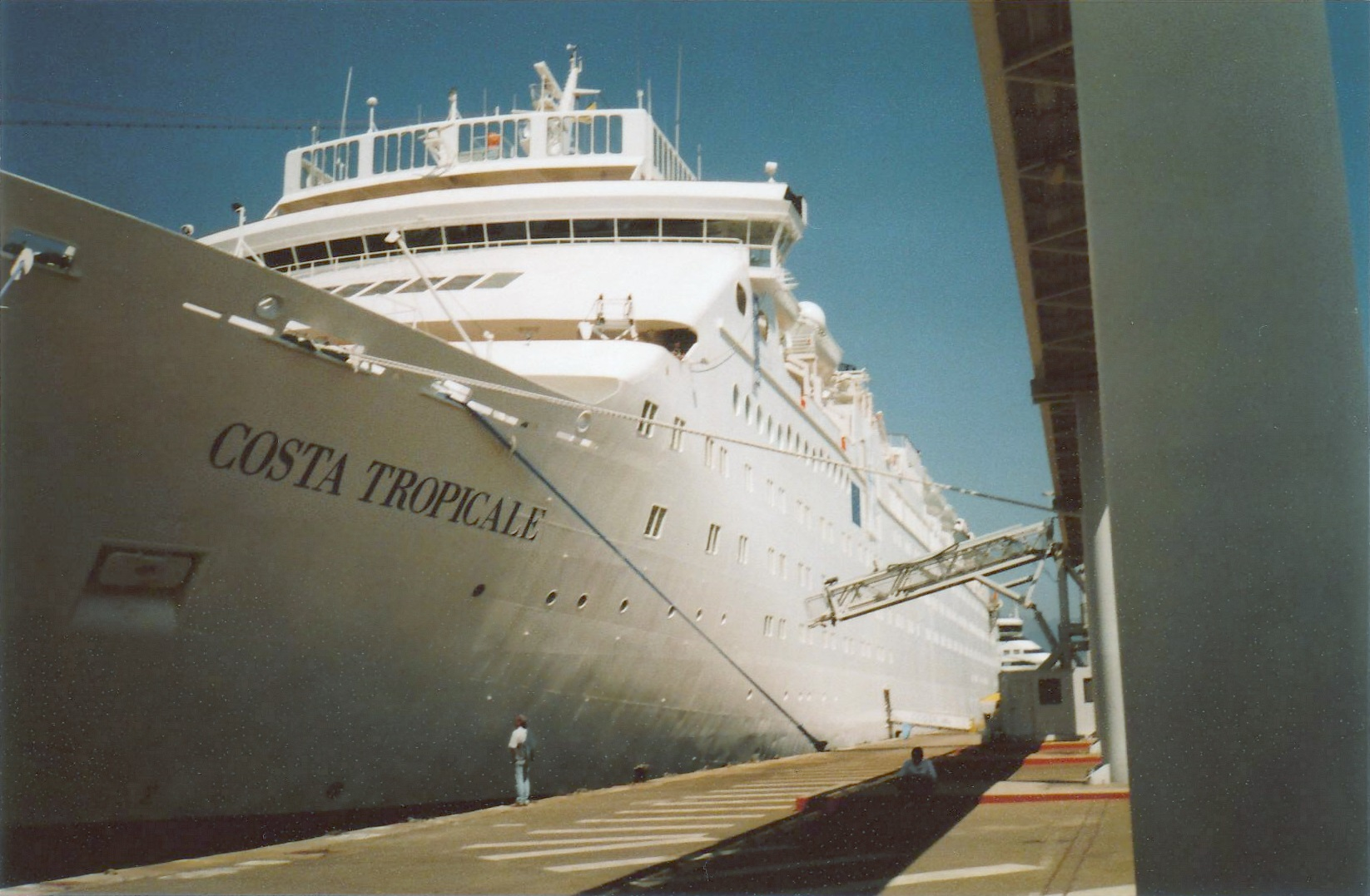
Costa Tropicale at Ajaccio, Corsica.

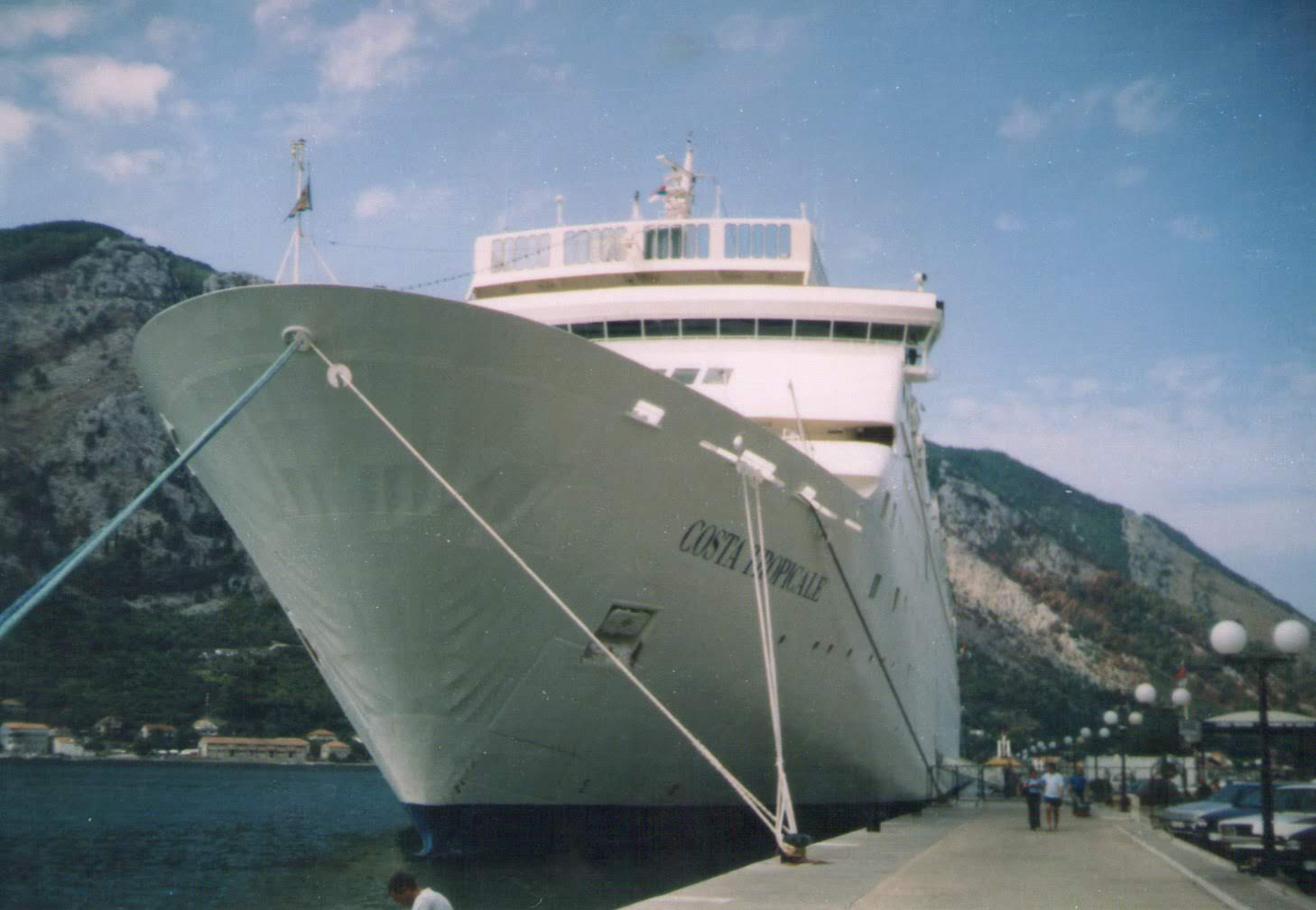
Costa Tropicale at Kotor, Montenegro (2003)

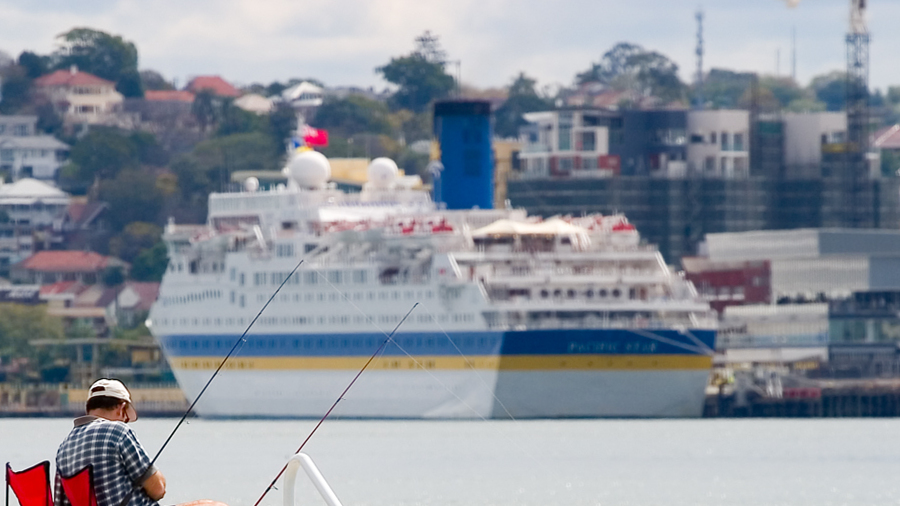
Pacific Star at Bulimba

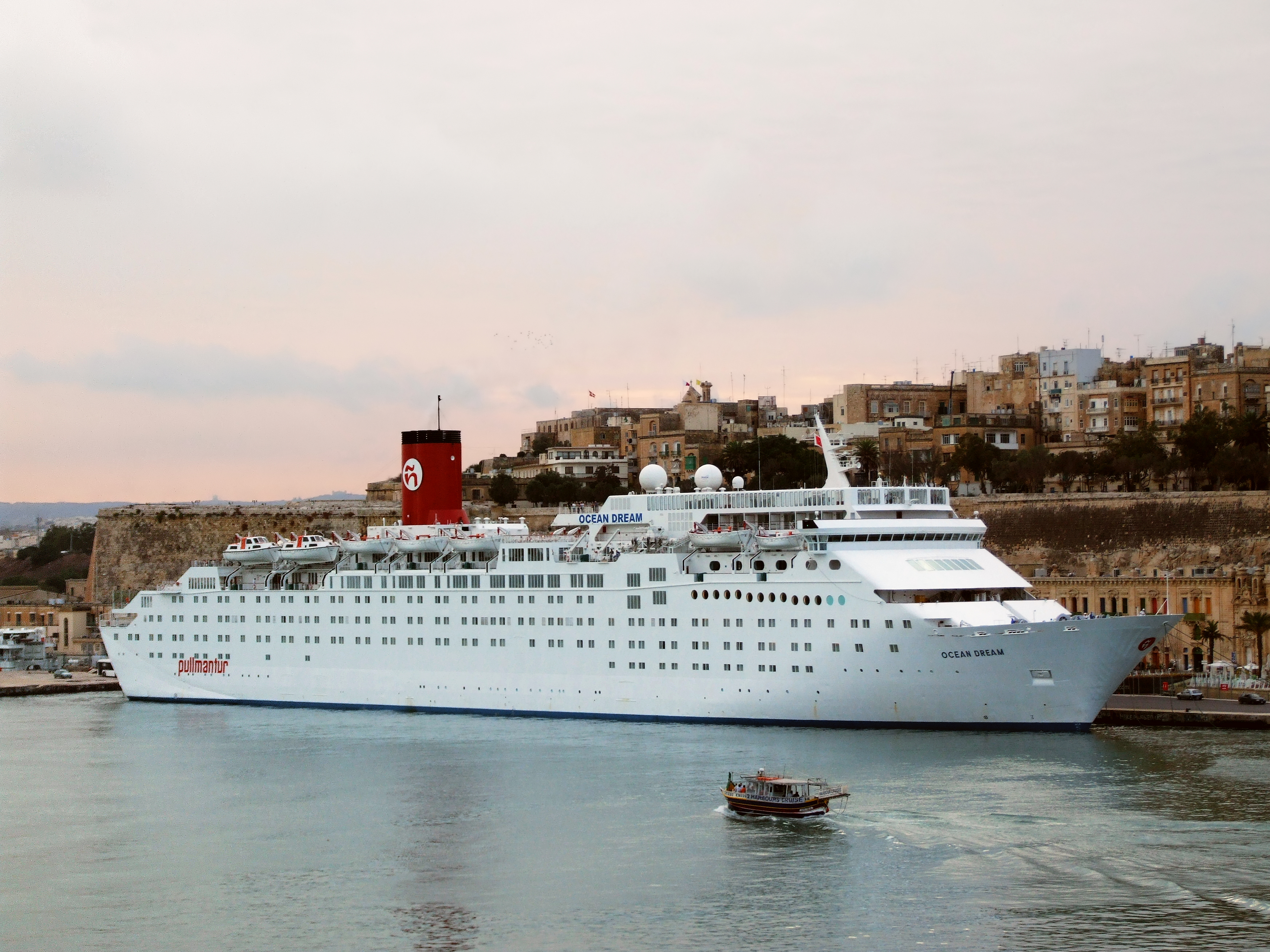
Ocean Dream at Valletta, Malta.

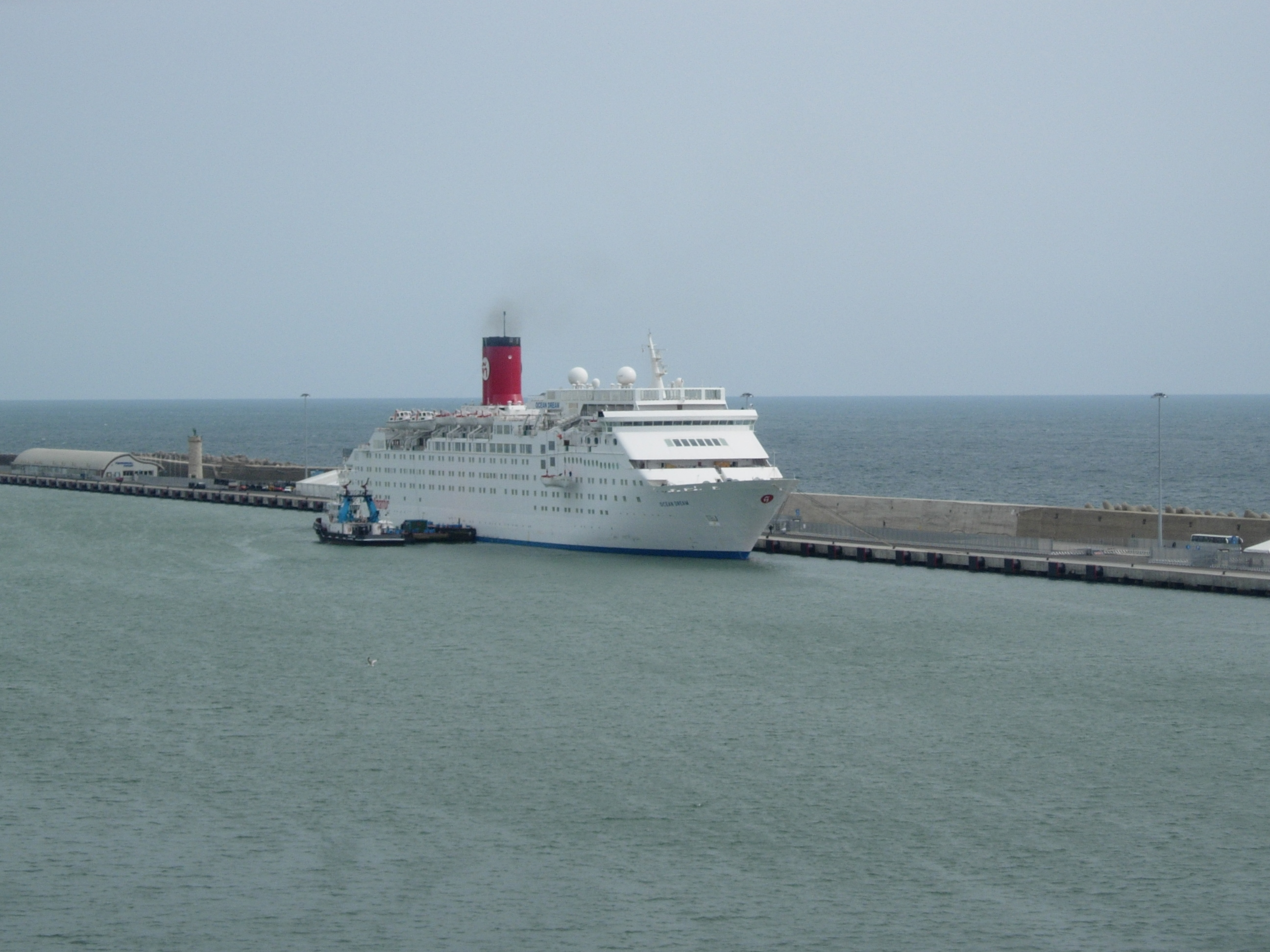
Ocean Dream at Civitavecchia, Italy.

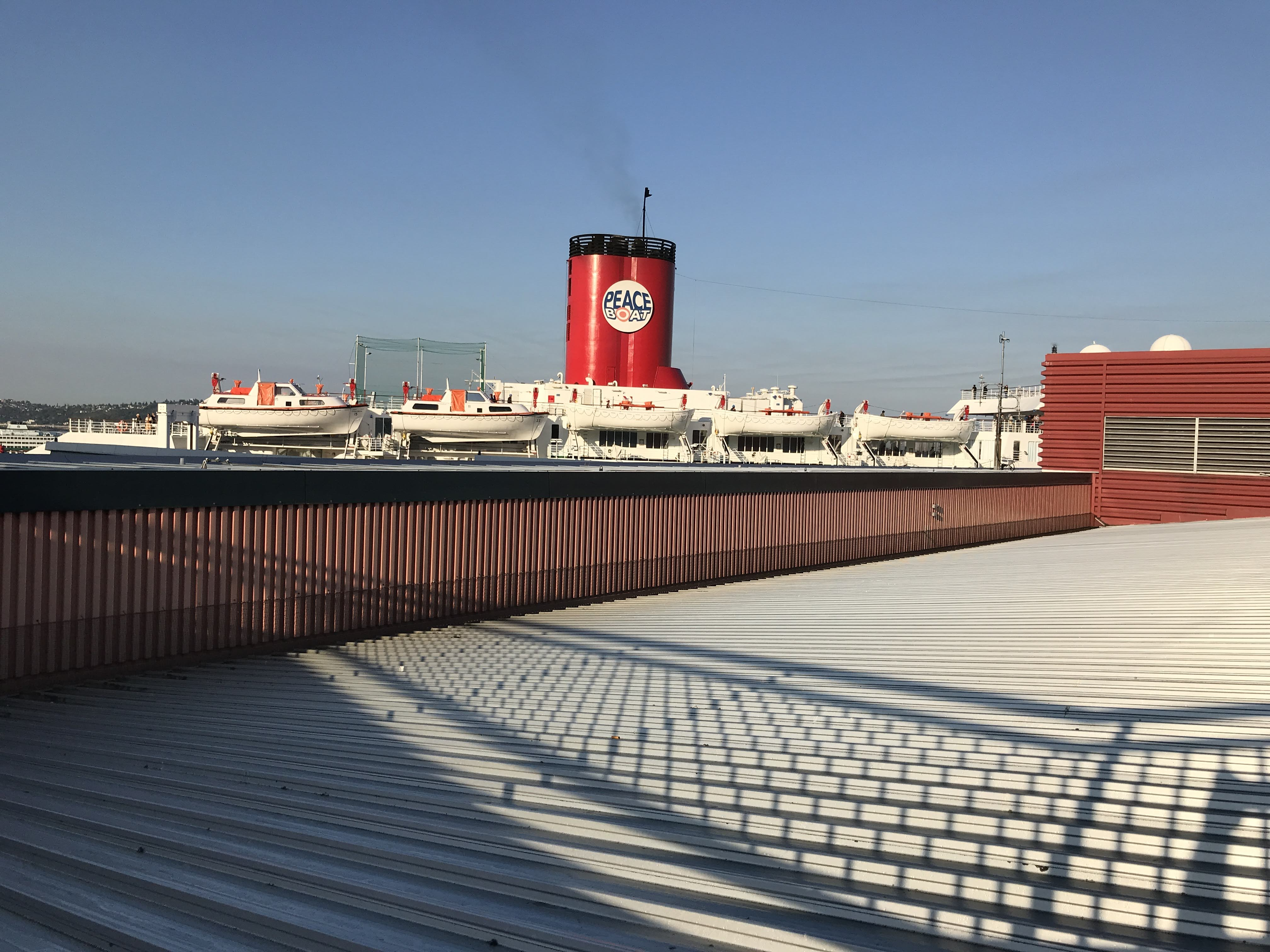
Ocean Dream at Seattle 2018
