= MV Horizon =

Cruise ship built in 1989

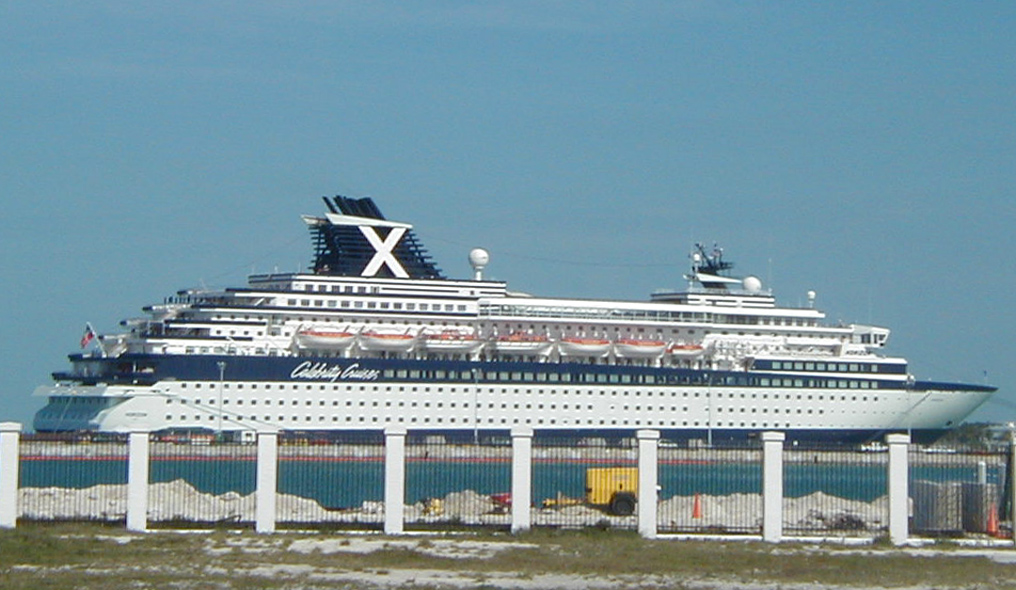
- Horizon at Key West.

History
- Name: 1990–2005: Horizon; 2005–2009: Island Star; 2009–2010: Pacific Dream; 2010–2012: Horizon; 2012–2017: L'Horizon; 2017–2022: Horizon; 2022: Ori
- Operator: 1990–2005: Celebrity Cruises; 2005–2009: Island Cruises; 2009–2012: Pullmantur Cruises; 2012–2017: Croisières de France; 2017-2020: Pullmantur Cruises
- Port of registry: 1990–2002: Monrovia, Liberia; 2002–2009: Nassau, Bahamas; 2009–2021: Valletta, Malta
- Builder: Meyer Werft, Papenburg
- Yard number: 619
- Launched: 19 November 1989
- Christened: 11 April 1990
- Completed: 1990
- Acquired: 30 April 1990
- Maiden voyage: 1990
- In service: 1990
- Out of service: 2020
- Identification: Call sign 9HYZ9; IMO number: 8807088; MMSI number: 249727000
- Fate: Scrapped at Aliağa, Turkey in 2022.
- Notes: Sister ship to Zenith

General characteristics
- Class & type: Horizon-class cruise ship
- Tonnage: 46,811 GT; 5,550 DWT
- Length: 208 m (682 ft 5 in)
- Beam: 29 m (95 ft 2 in)
- Draught: 7.31 m (24 ft 0 in)
- Installed power: 3 x 3300 kW MAN-B&W AUX
- Propulsion: 2 × 5994 kW MAN-B&W diesels; 2 × 3996 MAN-B&W diesels
- Speed: 21.5 knots (39.8 km/h; 24.7 mph)
- Capacity: 1,828 passengers

MV Horizon was a cruise ship that sailed from 1990 to 2020, and was the first new build for Celebrity Cruises. She was sent for scrapping at Aliağa, Turkey, in 2022.

== History ==
The vessel was ordered on April 28, 1988, at Meyer Werft by Chandris Cruises as a replacement for Amerikanis in the Chandris Fantasy fleet. However, upon the formation of Celebrity Cruises after an agreement with the government of Bermuda, it was transferred while under construction, and entered service for the new upscale brand.

The ship was significant as it was the first new build ordered by parent company Chandris and the new Celebrity brand, both of which only had operated second hand ships prior. The exterior of the ship was designed by Jon Bannenberg while the principal designers for the interiors were Athens based Michael Katsourakis, Patricia Hayes & Associates, and British Designer John McNeece.

The ship was christened by Myrto Chandris, the wife of company founder Dimitri Chandris, and was delivered on April 11, 1990. The ship was built for New York to Bermuda cruises sailing in tandem with the Meridian, calling at Hamilton and St, George's during the summer, and spent the winter sailing Caribbean cruises. The Horizon was joined by an identical sister ship, the Zenith, in 1992. The Horizon would continue the Bermuda routes, and would also be Celebrity's first ship to sail Alaska cruises.

The vessel's service with Celebrity ended after 15 years in September 2005, when it was transferred to Island Cruises, a then subsidiary of Royal Caribbean. The ship underwent refits over the end of 2005 and the beginning of 2006 and was operating out of Palma de Mallorca in the Mediterranean Sea as Island Star in summer and from Caribbean in winter season of 2008. It advertised cruising as "relaxed, friendly, and informal".

On 6 October 2008, Royal Caribbean Cruises Ltd. (RCL), the owner of Island Star, sold their 50% interest in Island Cruises to First Choice Holidays. Island Star was reported to be transferred to the fleet of RCL's Spain-based subsidiary Pullmantur Cruises, although reports in May 2009 said that the ship would go to another Royal Caribbean company, CDF Croisières de France. Pictures in May 2009 showed the ship in Pullmantur Cruises colors and renamed Pacific Dream, although the trademark "X" of Celebrity Cruises, while painted-over, could still be seen. Horizon sailed European and Caribbean itineraries.

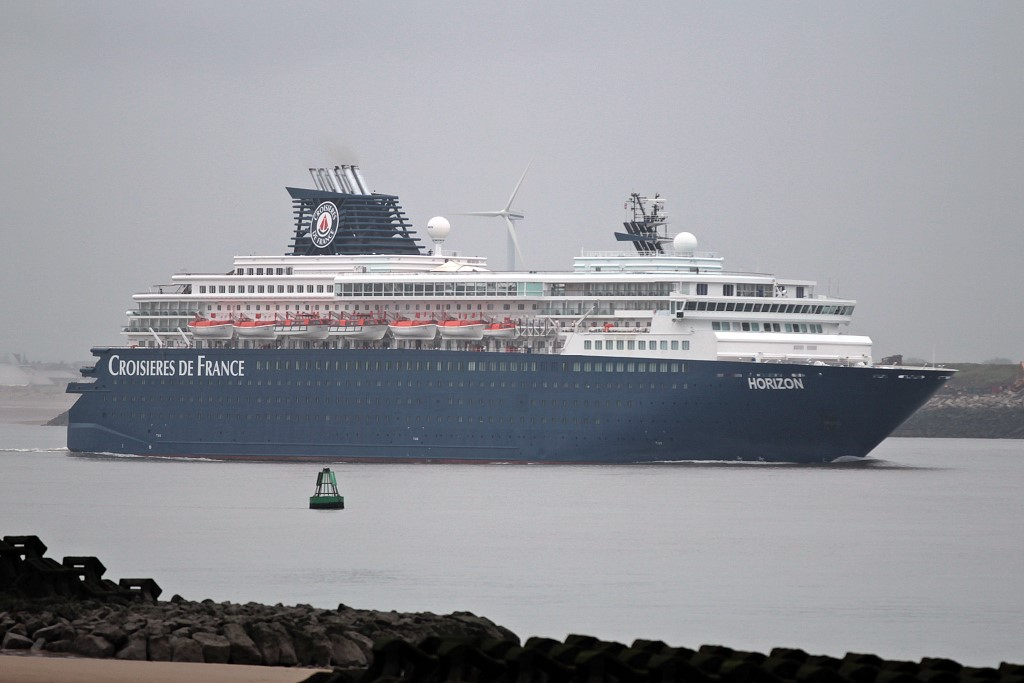
Pullmantur's Horizon on the River Mersey

In November 2010, it was reported that Pacific Dream would be replacing their ship Bleu de France. She was renamed L'Horizon in 2012.

In late 2016, it was announced that the CDF Croisières de France brand was to be discontinued, with Horizon returning to the fleet of Pullmantur Cruises.

An anonymous crew member of the Horizon reported on 28 March 2020 that a member of the crew had tested positive for COVID-19 on 26 March 2020. With about 250 crew members and contractors aboard, the ship had docked at Port Rashid in Dubai on 15 March 2020, and the crew has been isolated and placed under lockdown.

In June 2020, as a result of the ongoing COVID-19 pandemic, Pullmantur Cruises filed for financial reorganization under Spain's insolvency laws. The following month, Royal Caribbean International's CEO Richard Fain stated that Horizon, along with the other ships in Pullmantur's fleet, had been or will be sold. By August 2020, the ship was laid up in Elefsis Bay, Greece.

On 25 August 2022, the ship left Eleusis towed by the tugs Vernicos Sifnos and Christos XL to Aliağa for scrapping.

== Gallery ==
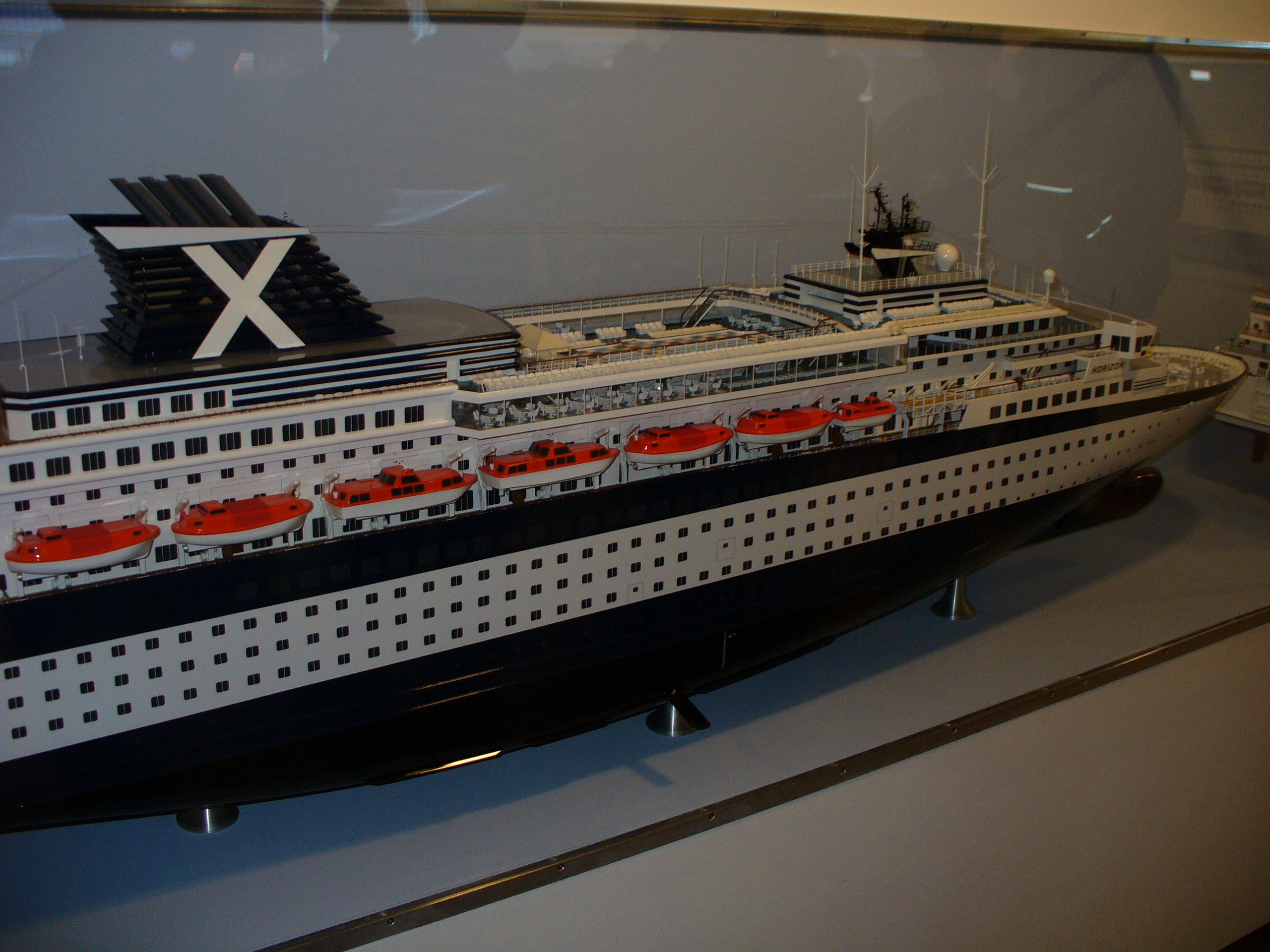
A model of the Horizon as built.

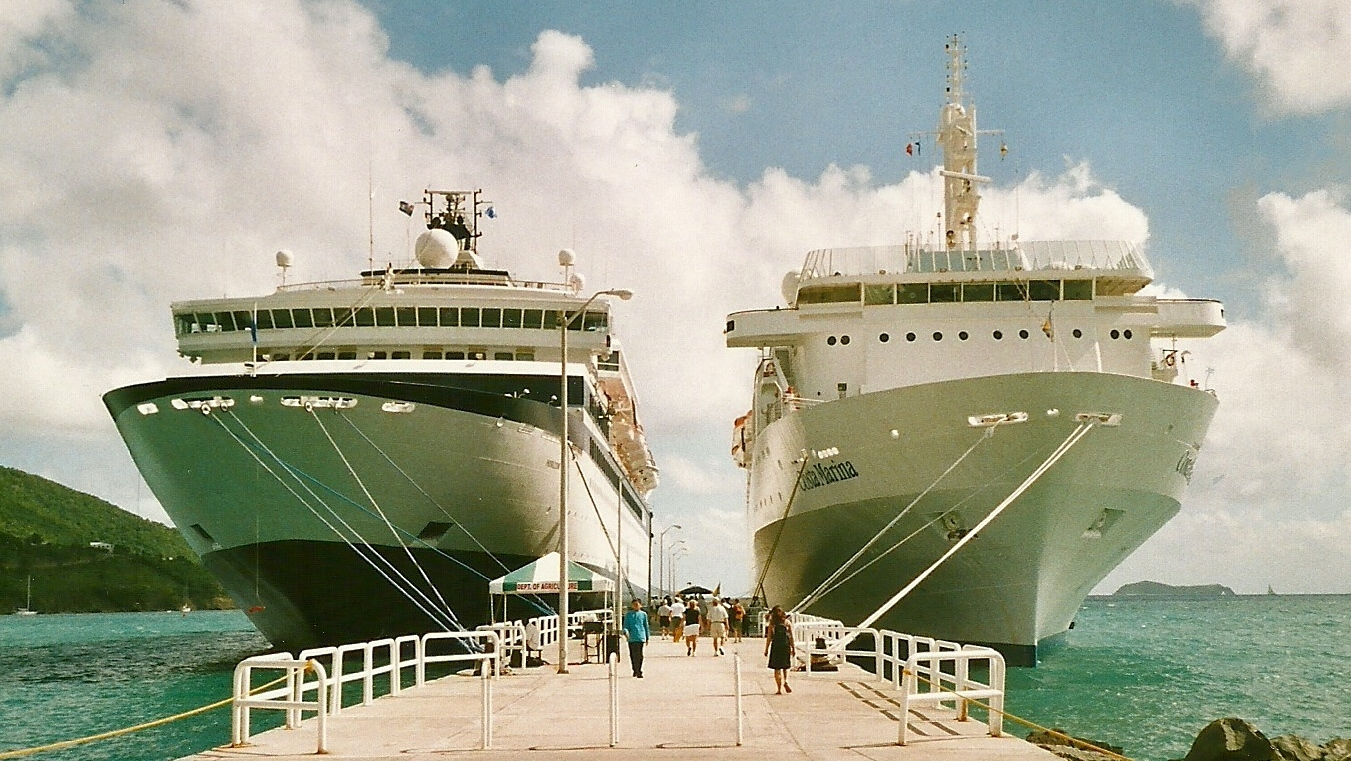
Horizon and Costa Marina

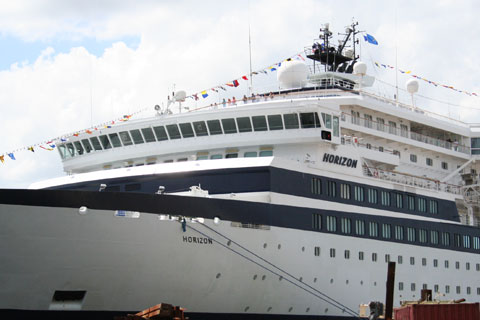
Horizon at Norfolk, Virginia.

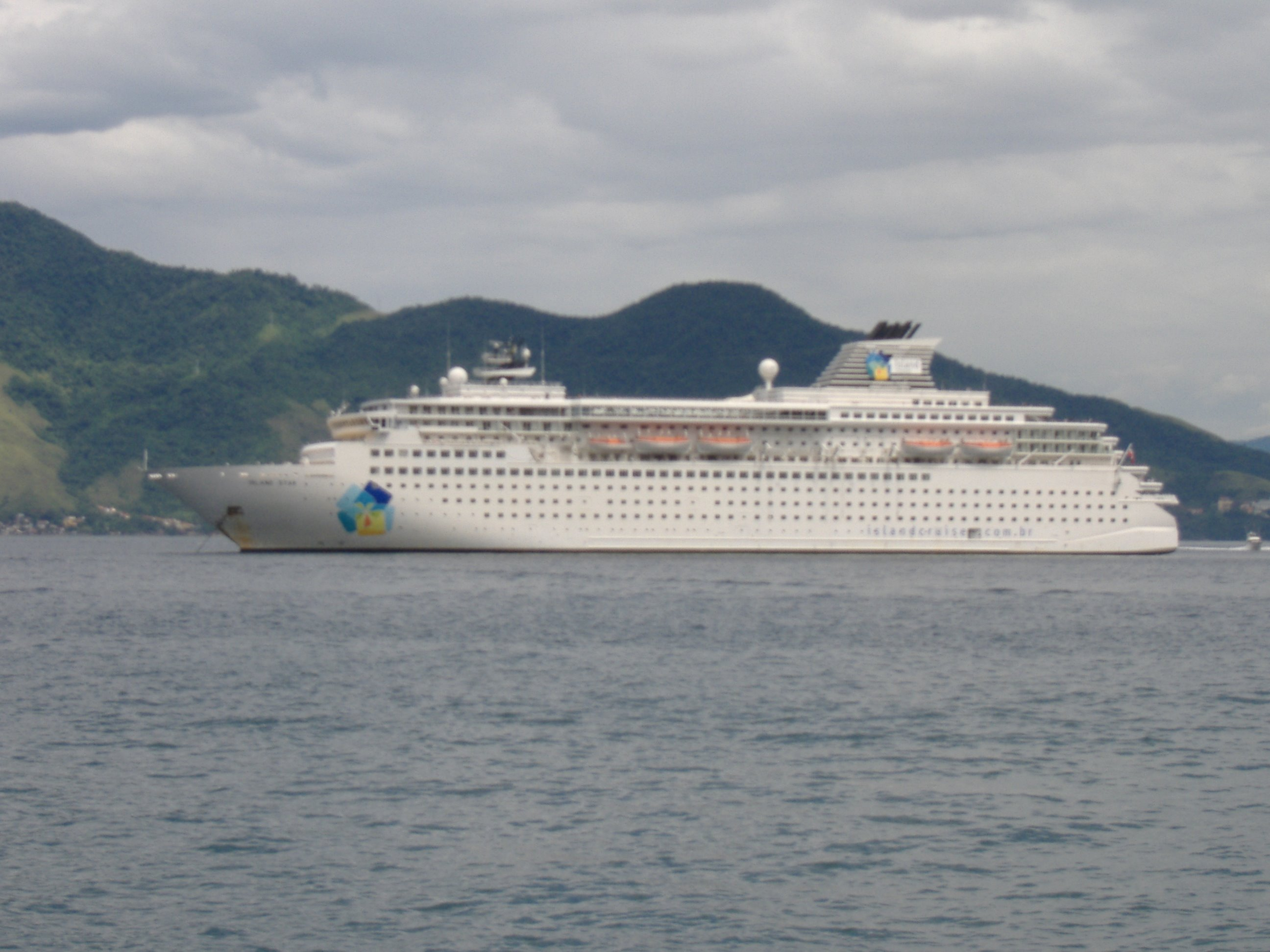
Horizon as Island Star at Ilhabela, Brazil.

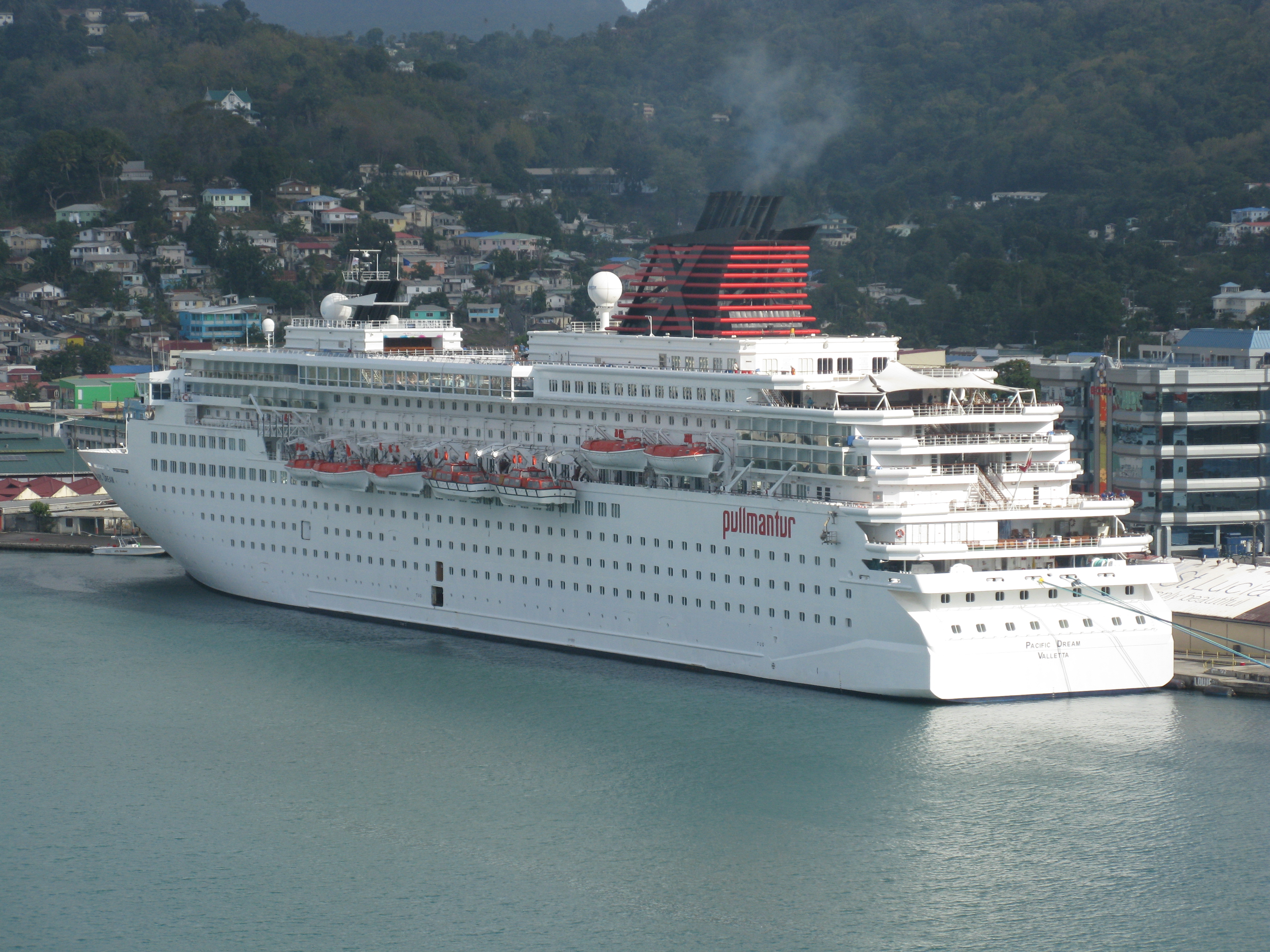
Horizon at Castries, Saint Lucia while still with Pullmantur Cruises.

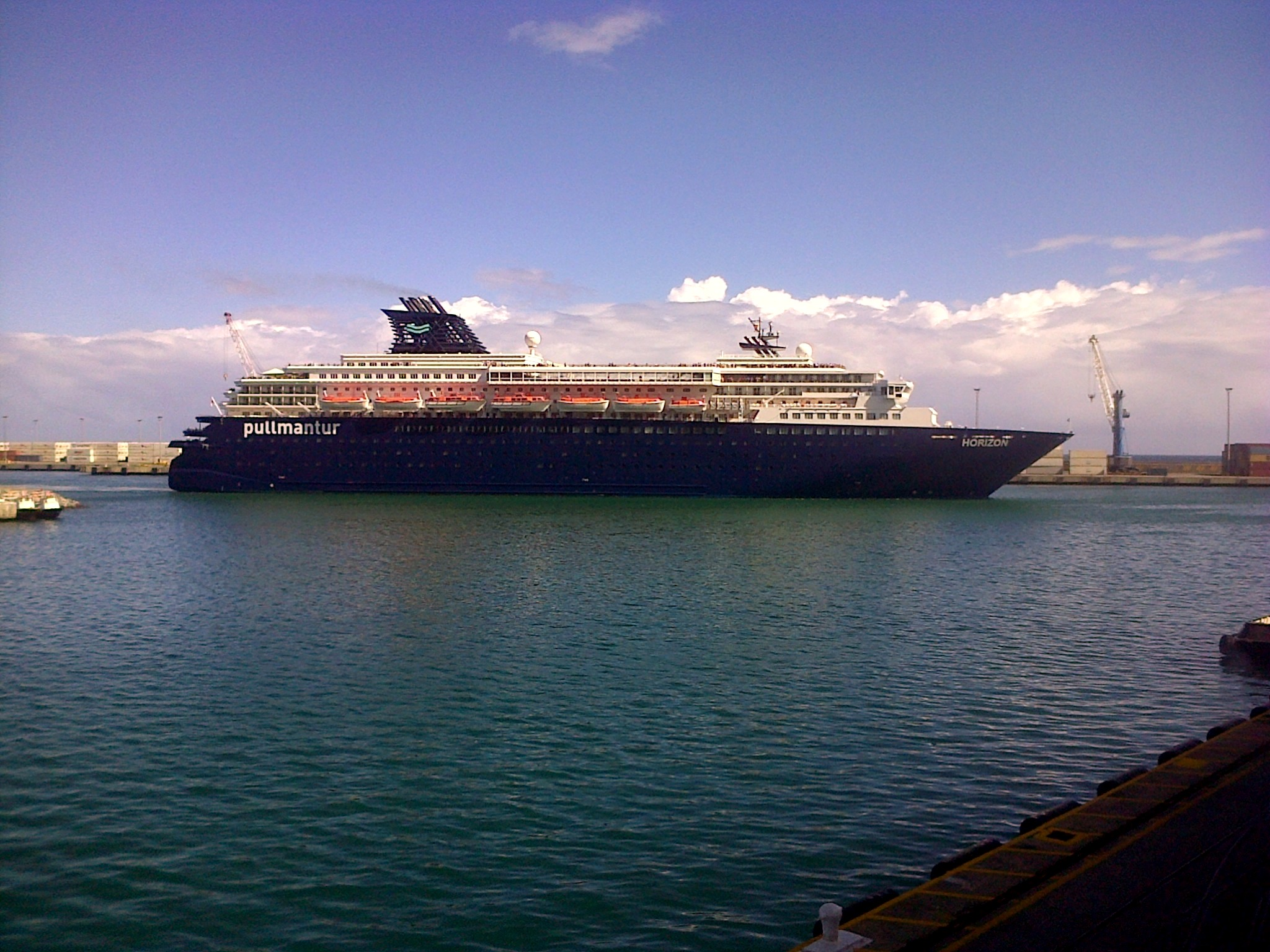
Horizon in Pullmantur Cruises livery before being transferred to CDF Croisieres de France.

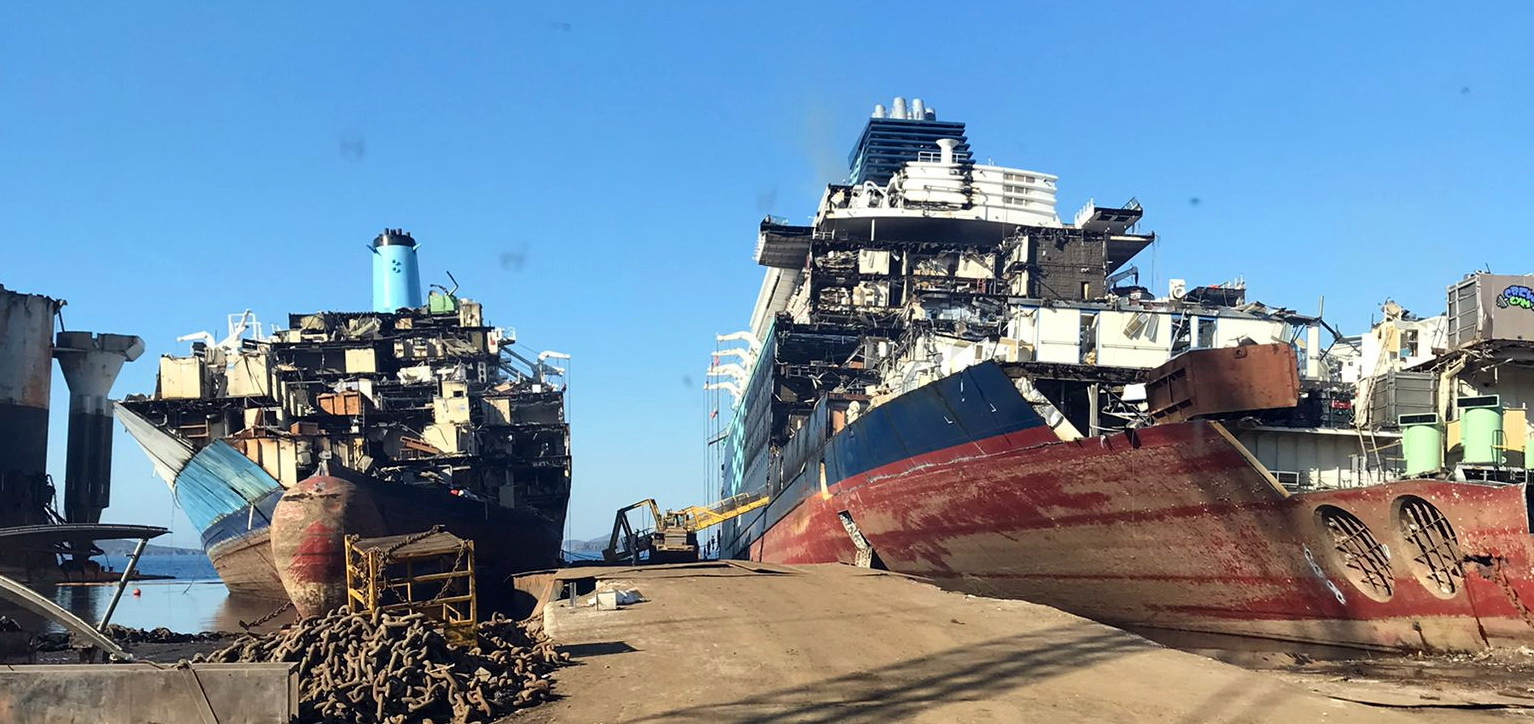
Marella Celebration and Horizon being scrapped at Aliağa, January 2023

== See also ==
- List of cruise ships
- MV Zenith
