= CDF Croisières de France =

France-based cruise line

- Founded: 2007
- Defunct: 2017
- Successor: Pullmantur Cruises
- Headquarters: Paris, France
- Area served: Mediterranean; Caribbean
- Owner: Springwater Capital (51%); Royal Caribbean Group (49%)
- Parent: Pullmantur Cruises
- Website: cdfcroisieresdefrance.com

CDF Croisières de France was a cruise line that catered to the French cruise market, with French as the primary language used on board. CDF was a subsidiary of Pullmantur Cruises, and offered cruises to the Mediterranean operating from mid-March until November. Most CDF cruises were all inclusive. in many, but not all cases, the price included airfare. However, cruises could be purchased without airfare as well. CDF ceased operations in 2017.

== History ==
Founded in September 2007 as a subsidiary of Royal Caribbean Cruises Ltd., CDF begun in May 2008 with Bleu de France as their sole ship. During the north hemisphere summer season the Bleu de France operated cruises in the Mediterranean out of Marseille, while for the winter season she relocated to the Caribbean, with La Romana, Dominican Republic as her port of departure. The company offered an all-inclusive product, with not only accommodation and meals but also all drinks and tips included in the price of the cruise.

In November 2010, CDF confirmed that they had sold Bleu de France to the British holiday operator Saga, however CDF retained the vessel on charter for a further 12 months. In 2012 CDF received a replacement ship, Horizon, which was transferred from Pullmantur Cruises. Horizon, which had previously sailed as Pacific Dream, for Pullmantur Cruises, Island Star for Island Cruises and originally MV Horizon for Celebrity Cruises; all three brands are currently subsidiaries of Royal Caribbean.

In 2014, the Zenith was transferred to the fleet of CDF Croisières de France, joining her sister ship the L’Horizon.

In 2016, Royal Caribbean sold a 51% stake in CDF's parent division Pullmantur to Spain-based Springwater Capital.

In late 2016, it was announced CDF would cease operations in early 2017, with both ships being transferred back to Pullmantur.

== Former Fleet ==
Ship	Built	Entered service for CDF	Capacity	Tonnage	Flag	Notes	Image
MS Bleu de France	1981	2008–2011	1158	37,301 gross register tons (GRT)	Malta	Previously Europa, Superstar Europa, Superstar Aries, Holiday Dream; Transferred to Saga Cruises as the Saga Sapphire.	
MV Horizon	1990	2012–2017	1875	47,427 gross register tons (GRT)	Malta	Previously Horizon, Island Star, Pacific Dream. Identical to the Zenith; Transferred to Pullmantur Cruises as the Horizon. Scrapped in Aliağa in 2022.	
MV Zenith	1992	2014–2017	1774	47,413 gross register tons (GRT)	Malta	Previously Zenith. Identical to the Horizon; Transferred to Pullmantur Cruises as the Zenith. Scrapped in Alang in 2022.	
MS ¿Century?	1995	Never entered service Planned	1814	71,545 groos register tons (GRT)	Malta?	In December 2013 it was rumored that it would be transferred to Croisieres De France, but in February 2014 Celebrity Cruises denied the rumor	
