= Island Cruises =

Defunct cruise ship line

Island Cruises (rcb)
- Company type: Subsidiary
- Industry: Transportation
- Founded: 2001
- Founder: Royal Caribbean Cruises Ltd. and First Choice
- Defunct: 2015
- Fate: Discontinued
- Parent: TUI Travel
- Website: www.thomson.co.uk

Island Cruises was a cruise line that was founded as a joint venture between Royal Caribbean Cruises Ltd. and First Choice Travel PLC, each of whom owned 50% of the company. The company operated in Europe, the Caribbean, and South America, aiming its products primarily at markets in the United Kingdom, Brazil and Argentina. First Choice was later acquired by TUI Travel.

In 2008, Royal Caribbean sold its stake in the company to TUI, and the cruise line's only fully owned ship, the Island Escape, was transferred to TUI's Thomson Cruises. Island Cruises was discontinued in 2015.

== History ==
Island Cruises was founded in 2001 by Royal Caribbean and First Choice Holidays PLC, and began operations in 2002 with one ship, the Island Escape. Initially, Island Cruises had planned to operate in Europe during the summer season (Northern Hemisphere), and out of California during the winter. Before the first winter season began however, the decision was made to change the winter schedule to 3- and 4-night cruises out of Brazil. During 2002, the Island Escape was featured in the reality television series Cruise Ship, commissioned by ITV. Island Cruises targeted the British family market, offering casual "totally relaxed" cruising; in South America, the company aimed at a younger audience.

In 2005 a second ship joined the Island fleet, when the Island Star was chartered from Royal Caribbean Cruises Ltd.

On 6 October 2008 Royal Caribbean Cruises Ltd. sold their share in Island Cruises to TUI Travel PLC, who had previously acquired First Choice Holidays PLC. At the same time the Royal Caribbean announced they would be ending the charter of Island Star to Island Cruises in April 2009.

Sailings of the Island Star after April 2009 were cancelled, and the ship was re-deployed to Pullmantur Cruises, another subsidiary of Royal Caribbean Cruises Ltd as the MV Pacific Dream. Island Escape's sailings were unaffected, but sold under TUI's existing Thomson Cruises brand.

In October 2015, the Island Cruise brand was discontinued after the sole ship Island Escape completed her last scheduled cruise with Thomson Cruises, now operating as Marella Cruises.

== Former Ships ==
Ship	Built	Enter service for Island Cruises	Gross Tonnage	Flag	Status as of today	Image
Island Escape	1982	2002-2015	26,747 GT	Bahamas	Scrapped in Alang in 2018.	
Island Star	1990	2005-2009	47,255 GT	Bahamas	Scrapped in Aliağa in 2022.	
