= MV Zenith =

Horizon-class cruise ship

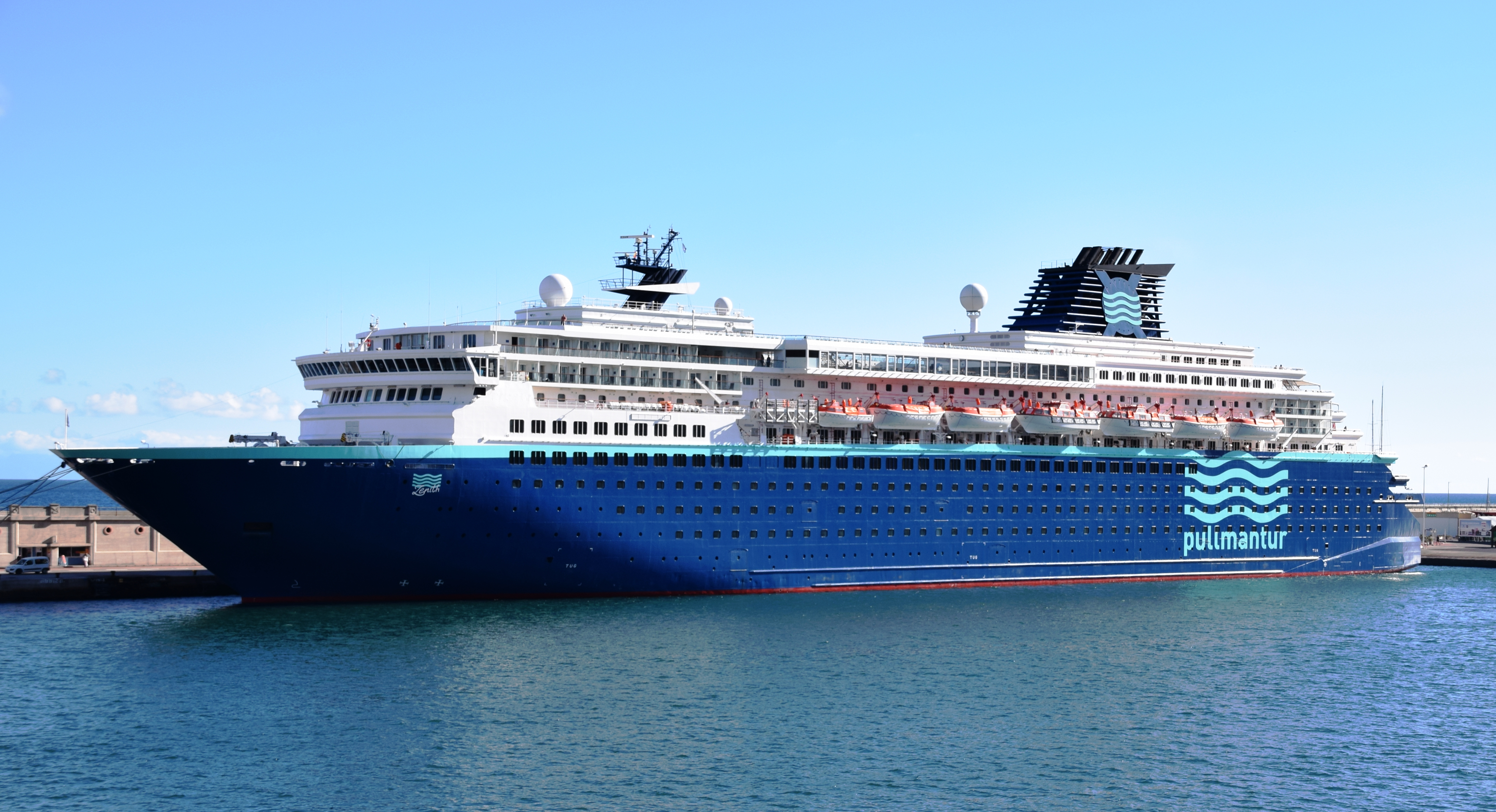
- Zenith in Pullmantur livery (Tenerife, 2019)

History
- Name: Zenith (1992–2020); The Zenith (2020–2022); TSM Singapore (2022–2022); Singa (2022–2022)
- Operator: (1992–2007): Celebrity Cruises; (2007–2014): Pullmantur Cruises; (2014–2017): Croisières de France; (2017–2019): Pullmantur Cruises; (2020–2022): Peace Boat
- Port of registry: (1992–2002): Monrovia, Liberia; (2002–2007): Nassau, Bahamas; (2007–2020): Valletta, Malta; (2020–2022): Panama; (2022–2022): Palau
- Builder: Meyer Werft, Papenburg, Germany
- Yard number: 620
- Laid down: 18 October 1990
- Launched: 31 October 1991
- Completed: 1 March 1992
- Acquired: February 1992
- Maiden voyage: 1992
- In service: 4 April 1992
- Out of service: March 2020
- Identification: IMO number: 8918136; MMSI number: 256561000; Call sign: 9HXM8
- Fate: Beached for scrap in Alang, India.
- Notes: Sister ship to Horizon

General characteristics
- Class & type: Horizon-class cruise ship
- Tonnage: 47,413 GT; 25,488 NT; 4,915 DWT
- Length: 208.00 m (682 ft 5 in)
- Beam: 29.00 m (95 ft 2 in)
- Draught: 7.70 m (25 ft 3 in)
- Depth: 24.10 m (79 ft 1 in)
- Decks: 12
- Installed power: 2 × MAN-B&W 9L40/54 (2 × 5,994 kW); 2 × MAN-B&W 6L40/54 (2 × 3,996 kW)
- Propulsion: Two shafts, controllable pitch propellers; Two bow thrusters and one stern thruster
- Speed: 21 knots (39 km/h; 24 mph)
- Capacity: 1,828 passengers
- Crew: 620

MV Zenith was a cruise ship built in 1992 by Meyer Werft, Papenburg, Germany for Celebrity Cruises. After a career for Pullmantur Cruises and Croisières de France she was sold for scrapping at Alang, India in 2022.

== History ==
Zenith was built as a sister ship to Celebrity Cruises' first newbuild, Horizon. The ship's designer was yacht designer Jan Bannenberg, with interiors designed by Michael Katsourakis and British designer John McNeece. Zenith was delivered in February 1992 and set under Liberian flag, and used for cruises from Florida to the Caribbean and Bermuda islands. She was featured in the final scene of Captain Ron. In 2002 she was re-flagged in the Bahamas. In 2007 she was transferred to Pullmantur Cruises and used for cruises around the Mediterranean.

A seven-night cruise from 11 to 18 March 1995 aboard Zenith is the subject of David Foster Wallace's 1995 essay "A Supposedly Fun Thing I'll Never Do Again" (later part of a collection of the same name and originally published in Harper's as "Shipping Out"). Wallace refers to Zenith as Nadir throughout (although he insists "the rechristening's nothing particular against the ship itself").

In 2014, Zenith was moved to the fleet of CDF Croisières de France, joining her sister ship L'Horizon. CDF Croisières de France brand was discontinued in early 2017. The Zenith returned to the fleet of Pullmantur Cruises in 2017.

In July 2019 it was announced the ship would Pullmantur's fleet in early 2020 to Peace Boat, with fleetmate Monarch poised to take over Zenith's existing sailings.

In September 2020 Cruise Capital informed according to Hong Kong Cruise Society, Peace Boat is to replace the contracts of two ships Ocean Dream and The Zenith from service, replacing them with one larger ship that they had purchased—the current MS Sun Princess, to be renamed Pacific World from Spring 2021.

In May 2022, Peace Boat announced that all cruises in 2022 and 2023 to be operated by The Zenith were cancelled due to a change in contract with the owner company. She was laid up at Lavrio, Greece, but left the port on 8 June as TSM Singapore heading to Hai Phong, Vietnam. In September 2022 she has been renamed to Singa and has been sold for scrap in Alang, India. She never sailed for Peace Boat.

== Fires ==
The ship was damaged at the stern on 8 August 2009 when a fire broke out while it was moored at Frihamnen in Stockholm.

On 26 June 2013 there was another fire, this time in the engine room and causing a loss of power. It had to anchor 17 miles off the coast of Venice, Italy, until four tugboats came to tow it to port. One week later it went to the S. Marco shipyard in the port of Trieste.

== Gallery ==
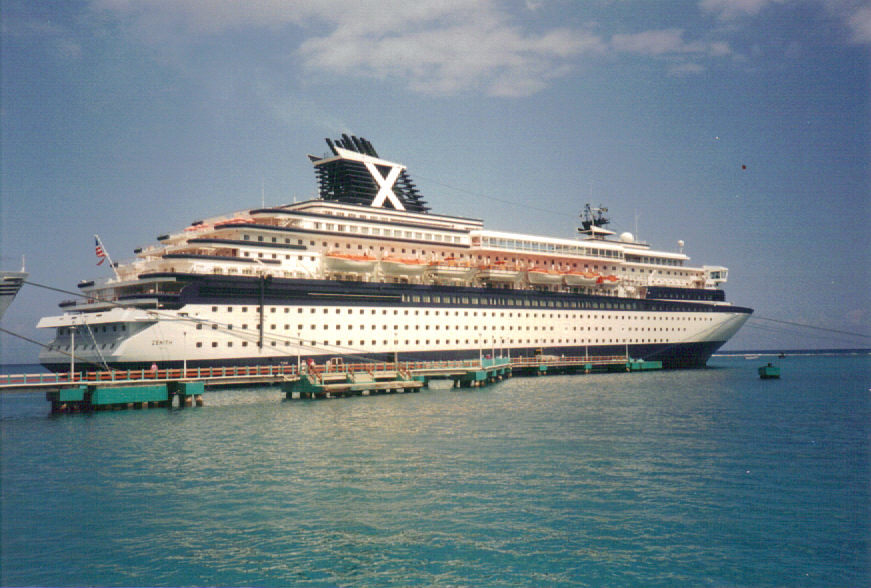
Zenith in Celebrity livery at Ocho Rios, Jamaica

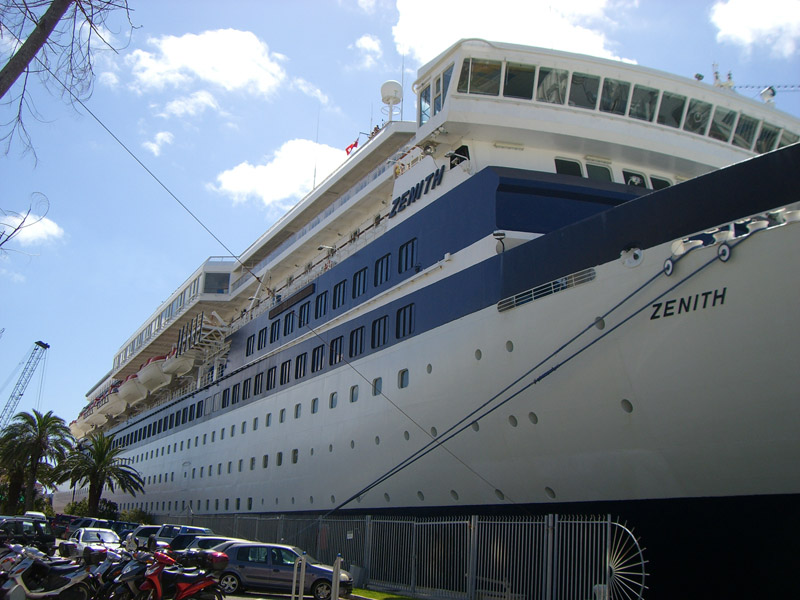
Zenith in Celebrity livery at Bermuda (2007)

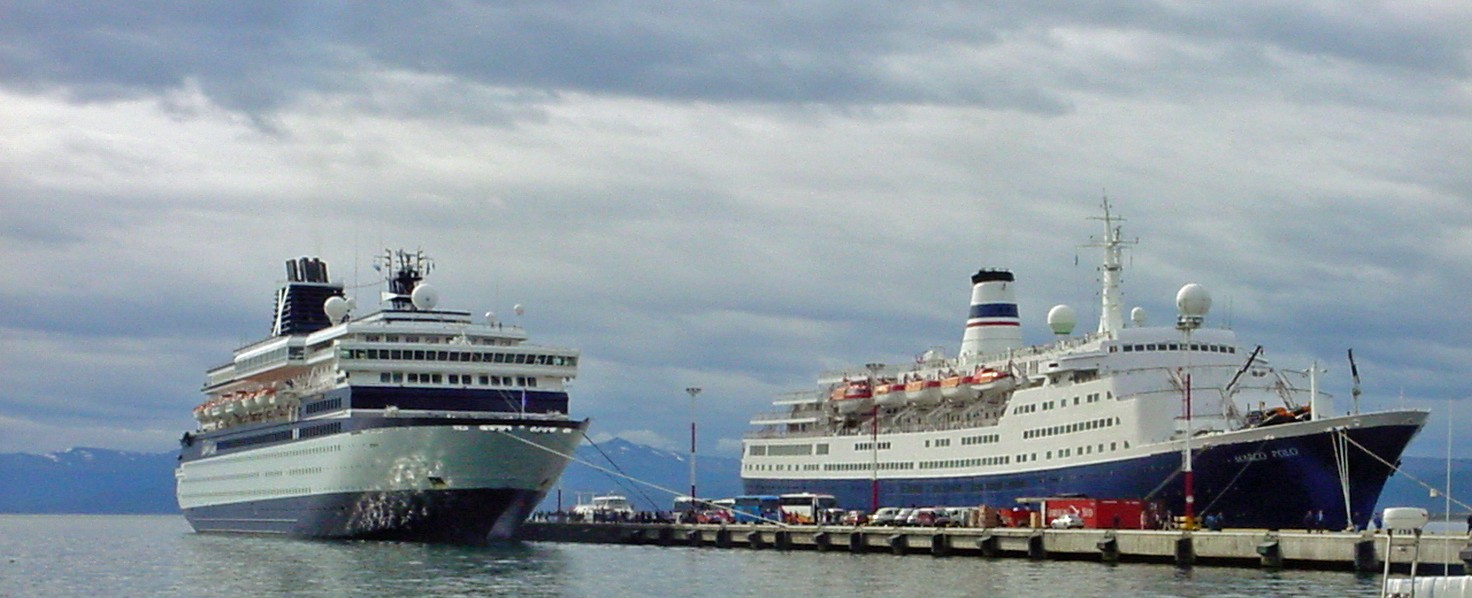
Zenith in Ushuaia (docked with the Marco Polo)

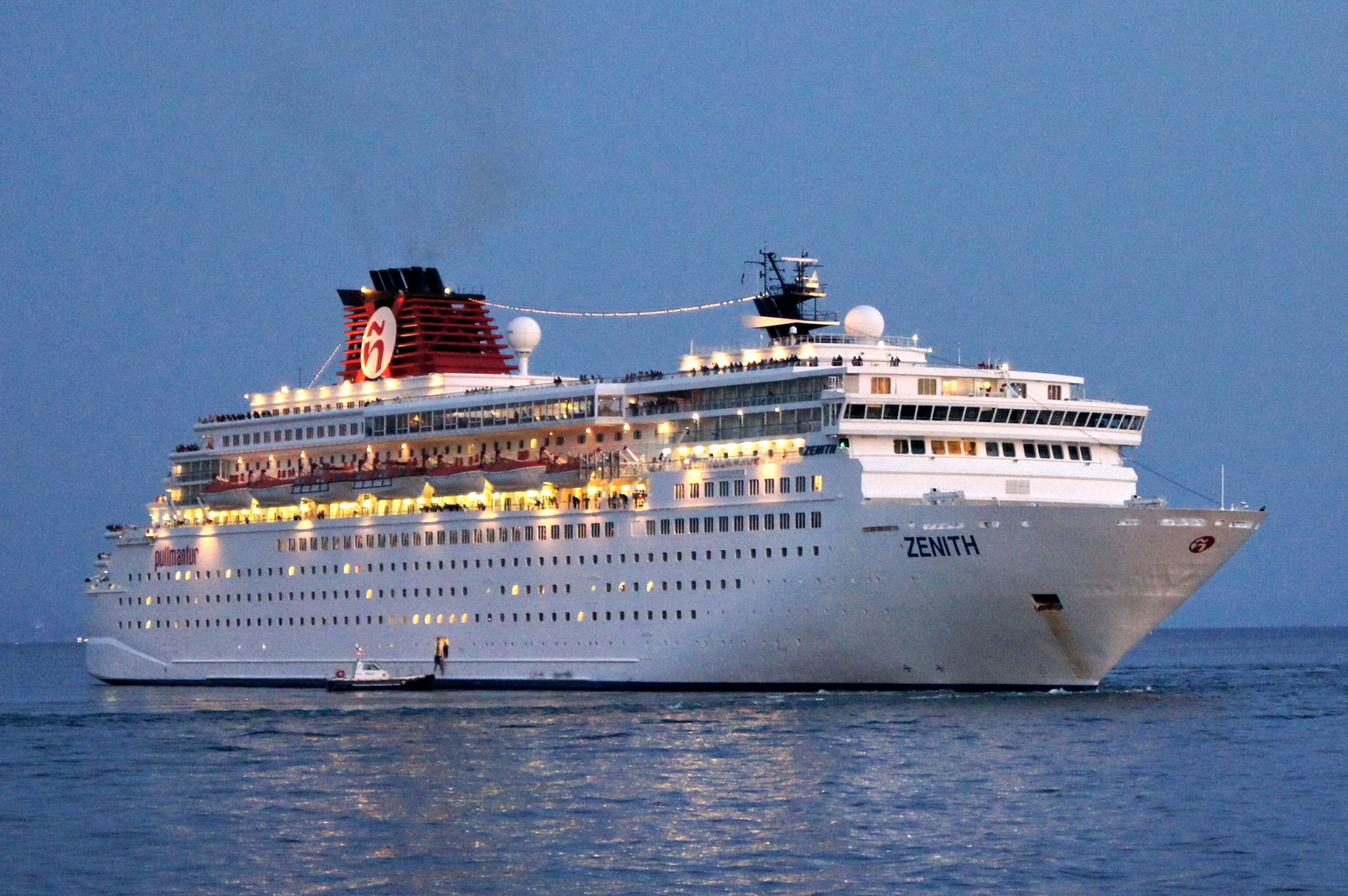
Zenith in Pullmantur livery at Split, Croatia (2011)

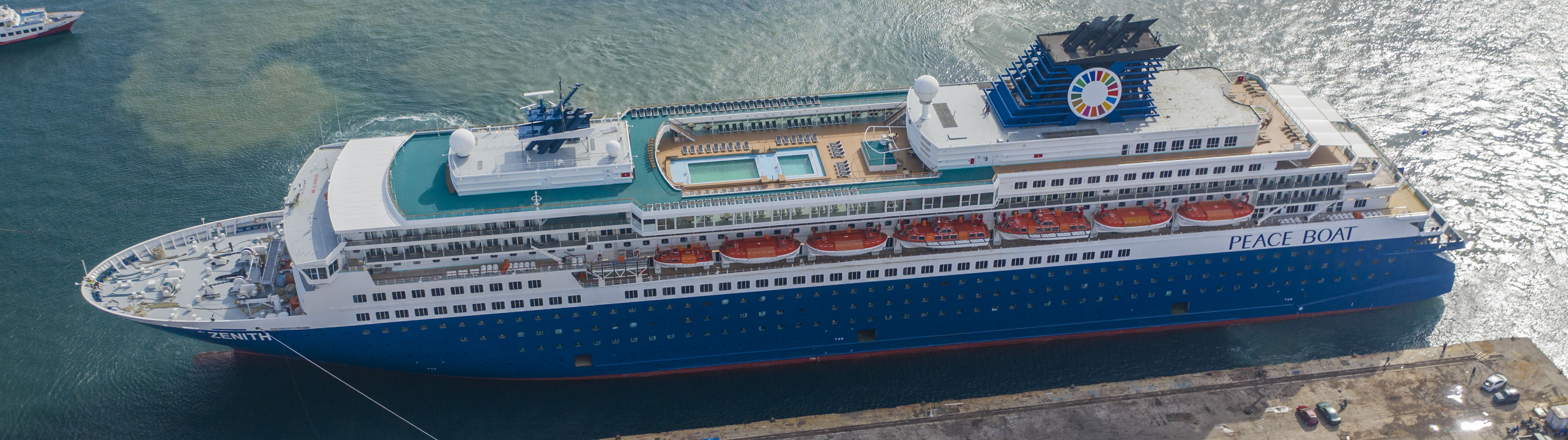
Zenith as The Zenith at Perama (2020)
