= Pullmantur Cruises =

2000–2020 Spanish cruise line

- Industry: Transportation, Hospitality, Travel, Tourism
- Founded: 2000; 26 years ago
- Defunct: 2020; 6 years ago
- Fate: Corporate reorganization
- Headquarters: Madrid, Spain
- Area served: Caribbean; Mediterranean; Northern Europe
- Owner: Springwater Capital (51%); Royal Caribbean Group (49%)
- Subsidiaries: CDF Croisières de France
- Website: www.pullmantur.es

Pullmantur Cruises was a cruise line headquartered in Madrid, Spain. It began operations in the late 1990s as an offshoot of the Madrid-based travel agency Pullmantur. In 2006, Pullmantur Cruises, through its parent company, was purchased by U.S.-based Royal Caribbean Group, but Royal Caribbean later sold a 51% stake in the cruise line to Spain-based investment firm Springwater Capital, retaining a 49% stake.

Pullmantur Cruises was the largest Spain-based cruise line. The company mainly marketed to Spanish passengers, although cruises were also sold by some travel operators outside the Spanish-speaking world. Some of the company's ships operated an "all-inclusive" product, where some extras, such as brand alcoholic beverages, were included in the cruise price. Originally, most Pullmantur ships did not operate cruises for the company during the Northern Hemisphere winter season. Instead, they were either laid up or under charter to other cruise lines, such as the Brazil-based Viagens CVC.

On 22 June 2020, due to the economic impact caused by the COVID-19 pandemic, Pullmantur's owners announced they had filed for reorganization of Pullmantur under Spanish insolvency laws. Pullmantur under Administration review was hoping to restart some operations with MV Horizon, laid up in Eleusis Bay, and two Celebrity Millennium class cruise ships.

By December 2020, a reorganization plan had been developed, to restart some cruises, with financial assistance from Royal Caribbean. Since mid July 2021 it was in process of liquidation.

== History ==
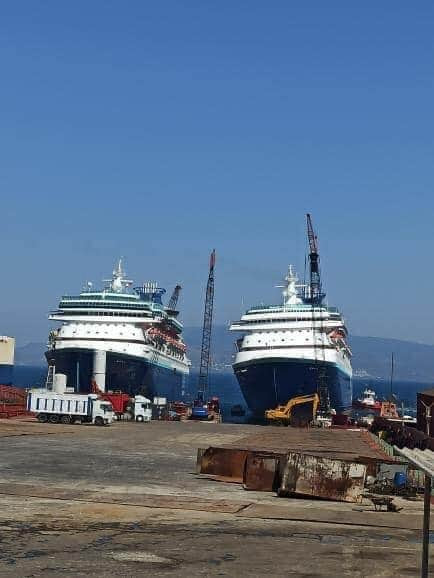
Monarch (left) and Sovereign (right) beached for scrapping in Aliağa, Turkey in July 2020.

Pullmantur began cruise operations in the 1990s by initially selling cruises on board SS SeaWind Crown, founded by Anastasios Kyriakides (subsequently merged with Premier Cruises), in the Southern Caribbean from Premier Cruises and later also on board Premier Cruises flagship the SS Rembrandt in the Mediterranean. Premier changed its business plan in 1997 and canceled its contracts with operators, such as Pullmantur, and later collapsed in 2000. Pullmantur then acquired SS Big Red Boat 1 and started its own cruise line, Pullmantur Cruises. Big Red Boat 1 reverted to her original name SS Oceanic, and began cruising around the Mediterranean from Barcelona in May 2005. The Oceanic became very successful, and in 2002, Pullmantur acquired a second ship, MS Pacific, from Princess Cruises, and chartered the former Renaissance Cruises ship MS R Five from Cruiseinvest. R Five was marketed under the name Blue Dream. Two more ships followed in 2003 when Pullmantur acquired MS Superstar Aries from Star Cruises and renamed her MS Holiday Dream, while R Five's sister ship MS R Six was chartered as Blue Star.

In 2004, R Five was chartered to Oceania Cruises. In 2005, Pullmantur purchased R Six, and renamed her MS Blue Dream after R Five exited the fleet. A third R-class ship followed in 2006 when Pullmantur bought Delphin Renaissance and renamed her MS Blue Moon. Later that year, Pullmantur's fleet grew to six ships when it purchased Pacific Sky from P&O Cruises Australia and renamed her SS Sky Wonder. In August 2006, Royal Caribbean Group announced it would purchase Pullmantur, making it Royal Caribbean's first wholly owned European brand. The acquisition was expected to be completed by the fourth quarter of the year.

Following the acquisition by Royal Caribbean, several transfers were carried out between the Pullmantur fleet and those of other Royal Caribbean brands. In 2007, Blue Dream and Blue Moon were transferred to Azamara Club Cruises, while MS Oceanic II and Celebrity Cruises' MS Zenith joined the Pullmantur fleet in their place. Oceanic II had only spent the 2007 summer season operating for Pullmantur.

In 2008, Pullmantur received Empress of the Seas from Royal Caribbean International and renamed her MS Empress. Pacific and Holiday Dream left the Pullmantur fleet in April and May for Quail Cruises and CDF Croisières de France, respectively. Also in May, Pullmantur purchased Pacific Star from P&O Cruises Australia and renamed her MS Ocean Dream. MS Sovereign of the Seas was also transferred to Pullmantur and renamed MS Sovereign. In April 2008. Lloyd's List reported that Pullmantur was in the process of purchasing Pride of Aloha from Norwegian Cruise Line's subsidiary NCL America. However, the deal fell through and Pride of Aloha joined Norwegian's fleet. In January 2009, Sky Wonder was renamed Atlantic Star, and in March, Oceanic was sold to Peace Boat. In mid-April 2009, Island Star was transferred from Island Cruises to Pullmantur Cruises.

In April 2013, Royal Caribbean transferred Monarch of the Seas to Pullmantur. Ocean Dream was chartered to Peace Boat to replace Oceanic and Pacific Dream, which had been renamed Horizon, was transferred to CDF. In 2014, Zenith joined sister ship L'Horizon in the CDF fleet.

In 2014 it was announces that the Majesty of the Seas would join the Pullmantur-fleet in 2016, but these plans were cancelled in 2015, and Empress was transferred back to Royal Caribbean in early 2016.

CDF ceased operations in early 2017, and both ships in the CDF fleet were transferred back to Pullmantur.

In July 2019, it was announced Zenith would leave the fleet in early 2020, having been chartered to Peace Boat. Later in 2019, Pullmantur announced Grandeur of the Seas would be transferred from Royal Caribbean to Pullmantur, joining the fleet in April 2021. There plans were cancelled in 2020.

During the COVID-19 pandemic, more than half of the crew members onboard Horizon were reported to have tested positive for the coronavirus following the company's suspension of operations. In early-June 2020, Pullmantur's fleet had been moved into "cold lay-up" due to the company's extended suspension of operations given the pandemic.

=== Reorganization plan ===
On 22 June 2020, Pullmantur's owners announced that, due to the significant economic impact caused by the pandemic, they had filed for reorganization of Pullmantur under Spanish insolvency laws. It was also reported Pullmantur had begun dismantling part of the interiors of MS Sovereign and MS Monarch, with claims that "everything of value" was removed. A December 2020 news item stated that four companies had been declared bankrupt: Pullmantur S. A., Pullmantur Cruises SL, Pullmantur Holdings SL y Pullmantur Maltesas.

Pullmantur Cruises announced a plan to return and restart cruise operations. In a series of questions on Facebook addressed to the customers, Pullmantur had been asking for feedback on what would they like to see when they resume cruises. Among the questions the company asked was if guests are willing to pay 10-15 % higher prices than previously offered if it ensured a safer experience for everyone. After the fate of two Pullmantur ships, the Monarch and the Sovereign, was sealed in Aliaga scrapyard in Turkey, the company might try to resume cruises with the Horizon which was in cold lay-up in Greece Elefsinas Bay. The restart would be a tough task for Pullmantur since the company declared bankruptcy in July 2020. They said working together with the bankruptcy administration to introduce a new business plan that involved the return to operation and guaranteed the viability of the company, according the CEO of the company, Richard J. Vogel. Recently, the company has been in the spotlight in the Spanish media saying that Pullmantur left its headquarters in Madrid because of the inability to pay rent. Local media also reported that 127 employees out of 311, working in the headquarters had not received salary for the month of August 2020. Addressing this issue Pullmantur CEO, Richard J. Vogel, sent an email Friday 18.09.2020 to the entire staff, assuring them that the salary would be paid in following days. Regarding the non-payment of rent and the company moving out from the headquarters, Vogel said that they were reviewing different options, but there was no decision made to it.

The plan certainly required reorganization, as the board of directors had acknowledged in June 2020: "Despite the great progress the company made to achieve a turnaround in 2019 and its huge engagement and best efforts of its dedicated employees, the headwinds caused by the pandemic are too strong for Pullmantur to overcome without a reorganization".

The December 2020 news item stated that the Royal Caribbean had agreed to provide some funds to allow Pullmantur to move ahead with a "viability plan, and to carry out the reorganization process necessary to adapt the company to the new reality with a new fleet". In the meantime, negotiations were underway with the over 300 employees who were no longer working. In early 2021, Peace Boat returned Zenith to Royal Caribbean after chartering a larger cruise ship. In July 2021, however, Pullmantur was completely liquidated.

Horizon and Zenith were sent for scrapping in Turkey and India in August and September 2022, respectively.

== Former fleet ==
Ship	Built	In service for Pullmantur	Capacity	Tonnage^{1}	Status as of 2020	Image
MV Pacific Dream / Horizon	1990	2009-2012; 2017–2020	1,875	47,427 GT	Previously Horizon, Island Star, Pacific Dream. Sailed as CDF Horizon from 2012 to 2017. Identical to the Zenith. Scrapped in Aliaga in 2022.	
MS Blue Moon	2000	2006–2007	702	30,277 GT	Since 2007 MS Azamara Quest with Azamara Cruises	
MS Blue Star; MS Blue Dream	2000	2003–2005; 2005–2007	702	30,277 GT	Since 2007 MS Azamara Journey with Azamara Cruises	
MS Empress	1990	2008–2016	1,840	48,563 GT	Formerly Empress of the Seas for Royal Caribbean Cruise Lines, transferred back to Royal Caribbean Cruise Lines in early 2016.	
MS Holiday Dream	1981	2004–2008	1,158	37,301 GT	Transferred to CDF Croisières de France as Bleu de France in May 2008.	
MS Majesty	1992	(2021) never entered service	2,767	74,077 GT	Plans to transfer her to Pullmantur in 2016 and later 2017 were cancelled in 2015.	
MS Monarch	1991	2013–2020	2,852	73,192 GT	Previously Monarch of the Seas. Transferred from Royal Caribbean International in April 2013. Scrapped in Turkey in 2020.	
Ocean Dream	1982	2008–2012	1,412	35,190 GT	Formerly Pacific Star for P&O Cruises Australia. The ship was on bare-boat charter to Peace Boat from April 2012 onwards. Scrapped in Alang in 2021.	
SS Oceanic	1965	2001–2009	1,800	38,772 GT	Previously operated for Peace Boat. Scrapped in 2012.	
MS Oceanic II	1966	2007	782	27,670 GRT	Scrapped at Alang, India in November 2015.	
MS Pacific	1972	2002–2008	626	20,636 GT	Scrapped at Aliaga, Turkey in 2013.	
MS R Five	2000	2002–2004	702	30,277 GT	Since 2004 MS Nautica with Oceania Cruises	
SS SeaWind Crown	1961	1999—2000	734	23,306 GRT	Scrapped in China, 2004.	
SS Sky Wonder; SS Atlantic Star	1984	2006–2009; 2009–2013	1,250	46,087 GT	Scrapped at Aliaga, Turkey in 2013.	
MS Sovereign	1988	2008–2020	2,852	73,529 GT	Previously Sovereign of the Seas. Transferred from Royal Caribbean International in November 2008.Scrapped in Turkey in 2020.	
MV Zenith	1992	2007–2014; 2017–2020	1,774	47,413 GT	Previously Zenith. Sailed as CDF Zenith from 2014 to 2017. Identical to the Horizon. The ship is on bare-boat charter to Peace Boat, after leaving the fleet early 2020. Scrapped in Alang in 2022.	
MS Grandeur	1996	(2021) never entered service		73,817 GT	In October 2019 it was announced that the former Grandeur of the Seas would join the fleet in 2021, but it was cancelled in mid-2020.	
? (Pride Of Aloha)	1998	(2008) never entered service	1,928	77,104 GT	Pullmantur Cruises was making the agreements to NCL America to buy the M.S Pride Of Aloha (Now Norwegian Sky) in 2008, but in the same year, Royal Caribbean bought Pullmantur, in the end the agreements for the purchase of the ship were cancelled because they had been bought by Royal Caribbean.	
^{1}May be specified in gross tonnage (GT) or gross register tons (GRT) if built pre-1982.

== See also ==
- Wamos Air
- Premier Cruise Lines
