= Blue Sapphire (ship) =

Cruise ship operating for ANEX Tour

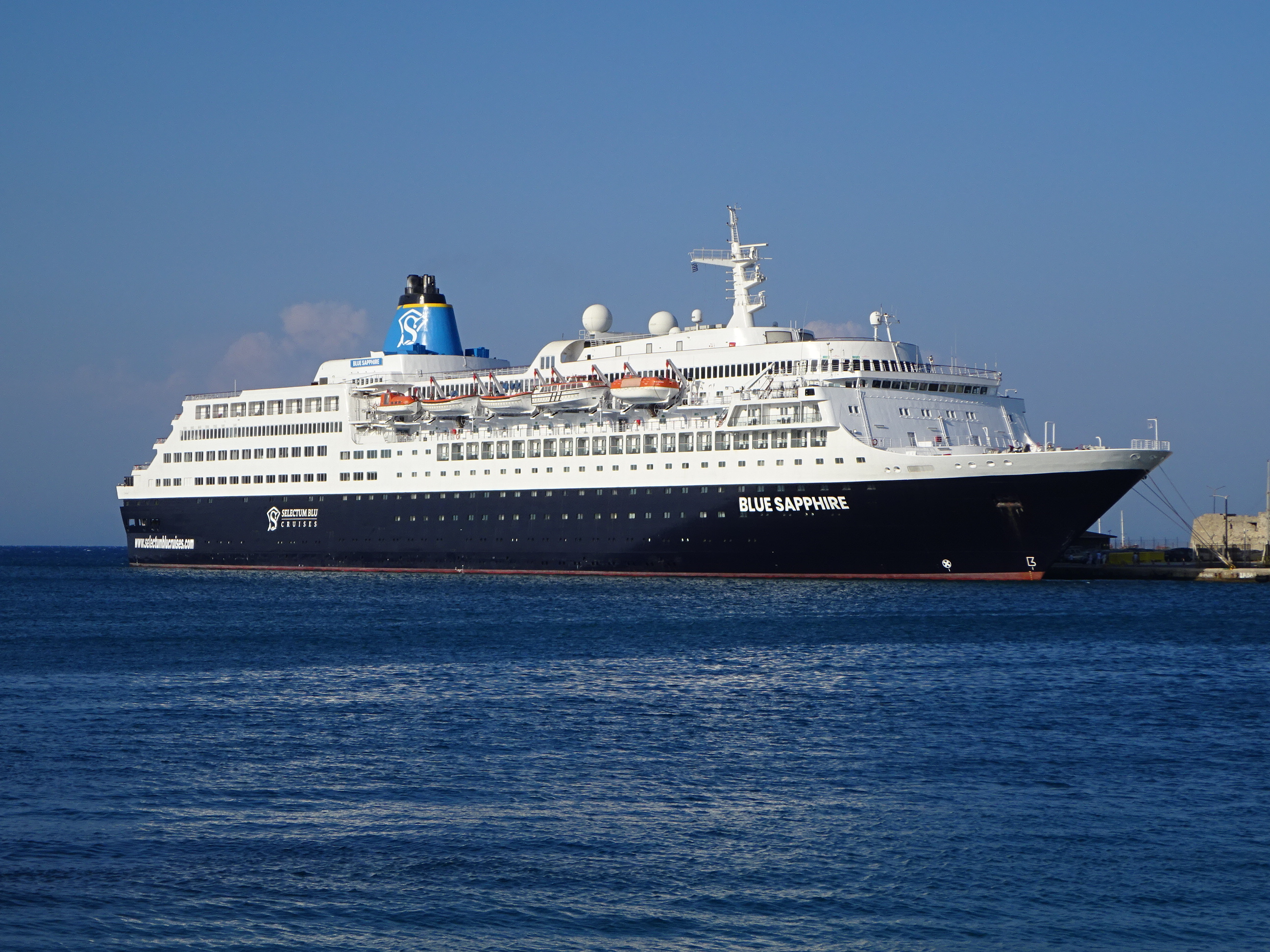
- Blue Sapphire in Rhodes, August 2024

History
- Name: 1981–1999: Europa; 1999–2000: SuperStar Europe; 2000–2004: SuperStar Aries; 2004–2008: Holiday Dream; 2008–2011: Bleu de France; 2011–2020: Saga Sapphire; 2020–present: Blue Sapphire
- Owner: 1981–1998: Hapag-Lloyd; 1998–2004: Star Cruises; 2004–2008: Club Vacaciones; 2008–2011: CDF Croisières de France; 2011–2020: Saga Cruises II Ltd; 2020–present: ANEX Tour
- Operator: 1981–1999: Hapag-Lloyd Cruises; 1999–2004; Star Cruises; 2004–2008: Pullmantur Cruises; 2008–2011: CDF Croisières de France; 2011–2020: Saga Cruises; 2020–present: ANEX Tour Selectum Blu Cruises
- Port of registry: 1981–1999: Bremen, Germany; 1999–2006: Nassau, Bahamas; 2006–2020: Valletta, Malta; 2020–2022: Nassau, Bahamas; 2022 onwards: Basseterre, Saint Kitts and Nevis
- Builder: Bremer Vulkan; Bremen, Germany
- Cost: US$120 million
- Yard number: 1001
- Laid down: April 1980
- Launched: 22 December 1980
- Completed: 1981
- Acquired: 5 December 1981
- Maiden voyage: 8 January 1982
- In service: 8 January 1982-present
- Identification: Call sign: 9HOF8; IMO number: 7822457; MMSI number: 256208000
- Status: In service

General characteristics (as built)
- Type: Cruise ship
- Tonnage: 37,049 GT; 5,168 DWT
- Length: 199.63 m (654.95 ft)
- Beam: 28.55 m (93.67 ft)
- Draught: 8.30 m (27.23 ft)
- Decks: 12
- Installed power: 2 × 7-cylinder MAN-Bremer Vulkan diesels; combined 21270 kW
- Speed: 21 knots (39 km/h)
- Capacity: 600 passengers

General characteristics (as Bleu de France)
- Type: Cruise ship
- Tonnage: 37,301 GRT
- Decks: 12 (10 passenger accessible)
- Speed: 19 kn (35 km/h)
- Capacity: 752 passengers (lower berths); 1,158 (all berths)
- Crew: 406

Blue Sapphire is a cruise ship owned and operated by ANEX Tour. She was originally built in 1981 by Bremer Vulkan of Germany for Hapag-Lloyd Cruises as Europa. In 1999, Europa was sold to Star Cruises and she was renamed SuperStar Europe and a year later, Superstar Aries. In 2004, she was sold to Pullmantur Cruises and renamed Holiday Dream. In May 2008, she was transferred to the fleet of CDF Croisières de France and renamed Bleu de France. In November 2010, she was sold to Saga Cruises, but retained on charter by CDF for a further 12 months. Following an extensive refit in Italy from November 2011 to March 2012, the vessel was renamed Saga Sapphire. Most recently, she was sold to ANEX Tour in June 2020 and renamed Blue Sapphire, scheduled for an official debut in 2021.

== Concept and construction ==
Since its formation in 1970, Hapag-Lloyd operated the former North German Lloyd liner Europa (originally Swedish American Line's Kungsholm) as the flagship of their cruise services. By the late 1970s the decision was made to replace the then-current Europa with a new state-of-the-art ship tailored specifically for the German cruise market, also to be called Europa. The new Europa would be the third ship to bear the name in the North German Lloyd/Hapag-Lloyd fleet. Designed before the advent of the mega cruise ship, at 33,000 gross register tons the new Europa was to be amongst the largest passenger ships in the world at the time.

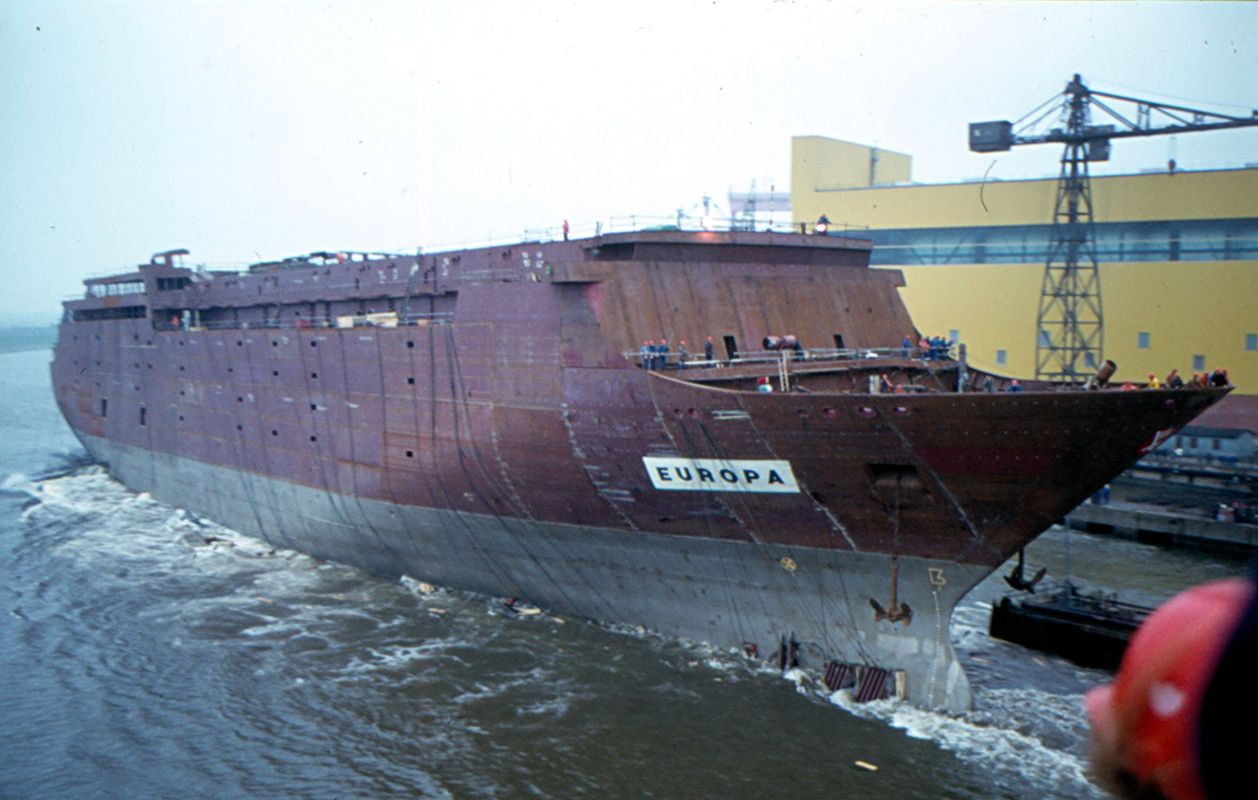
Europa being launched on 22 December 1980.

The order for the new Europa was placed with the Bremer Vulkan shipyard in Bremen, the home city of North German Lloyd. The ship was launched on 22 December 1980, and delivered to her owners on 5 December 1981.

Although Hapag-Lloyd originally considered a traditional two-funnel design for the fourth Europa, they finally opted for a modern, balanced design. The superstructure is moderately streamlined, with the boat deck located relatively high. The aft decks are tiered to allow a large amount of outer deck space. The exterior design of Europa was built similarly to Hadag Cruise Line's Astor, built at the same time as Europa by Howaldtswerke-Deutsche Werft at its yard at Hamburg.

For the interior of the ship, Hapag-Lloyd decided to adapt a design previously used in cruiseferries such as Svea Corona of 1975 and Finnjet of 1977, with the interiors divided vertically. Cabins are located to the front of the ship, furthest away from engine noise, while public spaces and various storages—where engine noise is not as big of an issue as in cabins—are located at the stern of the ship, above the engines. Most of the public spaces were built with higher than standard ceiling height.

Each cabin on the ship was completely pre-fabricated, with complete furnishing and soundproofing, and individually installed on board the ship. The ship was originally built with spacious cabins, all of which include illuminated closets, colour television and a VCR, with many cabins equipped with a bathtub. In 1999, a refit added six suites in the place of former officers' cabins, while six balconies were added to the existing suites under the bridge wings. During a 2011-12 refit, a small number of balcony cabins were created aft, while a considerable number of existing midships cabins were fitted with small French balconies.

The last iteration of the ship featured public spaces including a main restaurant spanning the entire width of the ship, a show lounge, two further dining facilities and several bars. There is one outdoor swimming pool situated amidships (the astern outdoor pool was removed) and also a large indoor swimming pool.

== Service history ==
=== Hapag-Lloyd ===
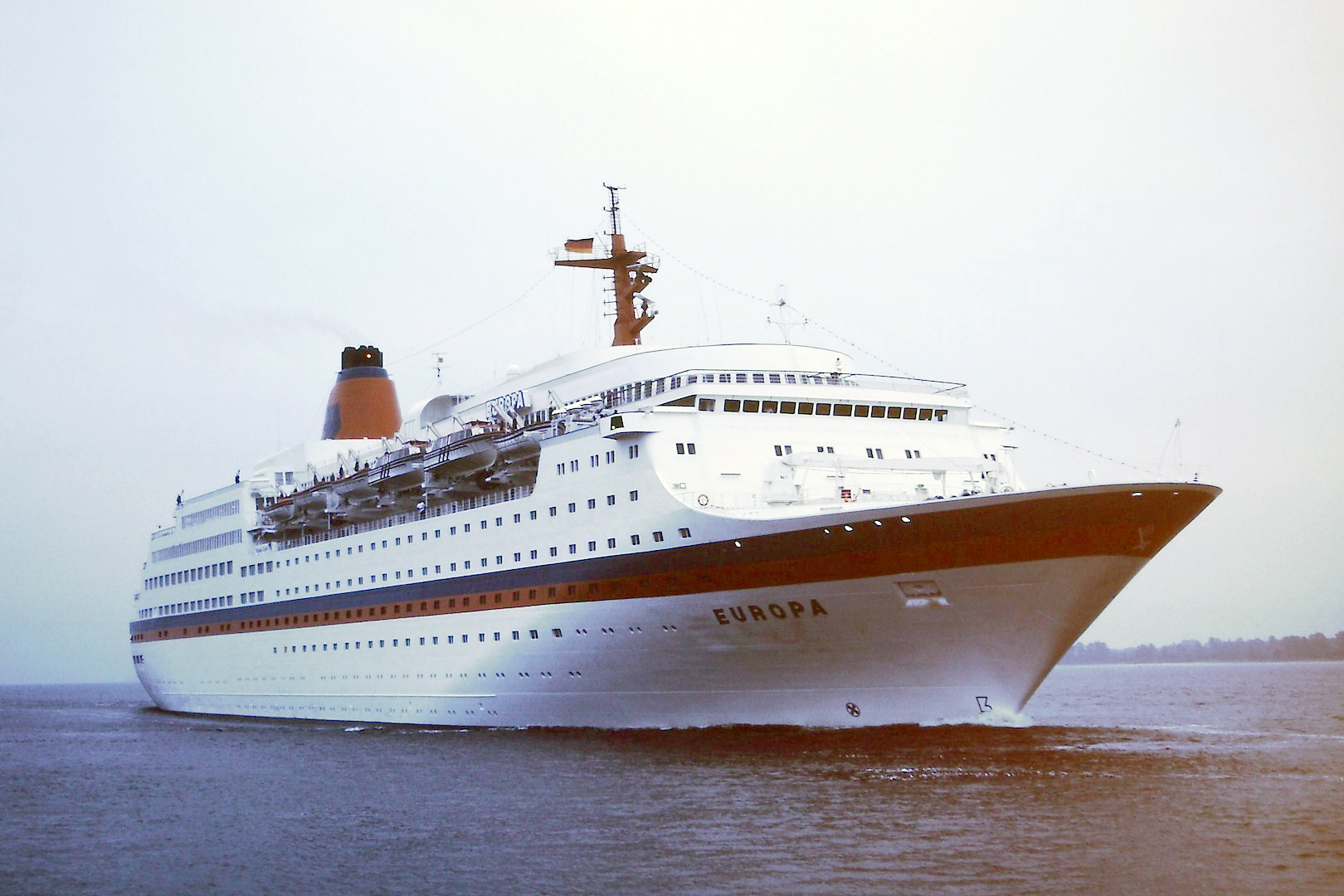
Europa at sea in 1985.

Europa left on her maiden voyage from Genoa on 8 January 1982, to destinations in Africa. Subsequently, she was used for luxury cruising all over the world, including on the Amazon River. On 3 August 1985, Europa ran aground off the coast of Greenland. She was refloated three days later.

On 30 April 1992, Europa collided with the Greece-registered container ship Inchon Glory outside Hong Kong. No passengers on board Europa were injured. Initially she was towed to Kaohsiung, where passengers were evacuated. Subsequently, the ship was towed to Singapore for repairs. After lengthy repairs, Europa re-entered service on 7 July 1992.

In the mid-1990s, Hapag-Lloyd decided to order a replacement for Europa (again, also named Europa). In preparation for delivery of the new Europa, the 1981 Europa was sold to Star Cruises on 5 April 1998, but was chartered back to Hapag-Lloyd until 30 June 1999.

=== Star Cruises ===
Star Cruises took over Europa in Hamburg on 1 July 1999. On the same date, she was renamed SuperStar Europe, and five days later, left Hamburg for Singapore, where she arrived on 31 July 1999. After receiving a $15 million renovation at Sembawang shipyard, in which balconies were added to the suites under the bridge wings, SuperStar Europe officially began operating for Star Cruises in October 1999, homeporting in Laem Chabang. After just five months of service as SuperStar Europe, the ship was renamed Superstar Aries in February 2000.

In March 2001, Star Cruises announced that SuperStar Aries would be transferred to the fleet of their subsidiary, Orient Lines, in 2002 as Ocean Voyager. However, these plans were shelved following the drop in passenger numbers caused by the September 11, 2001 attacks. As a result, SuperStar Aries was deployed to cruise from Thailand and Taiwan. During the SARS outbreak in 2003, the ship was based in Singapore, replacing SuperStar Virgo, which was redeployed to Australia. SuperStar Aries operated for Star Cruises until March 2004, when she was sold to Spain-based Pullmantur Cruises.

=== Pullmantur Cruises ===
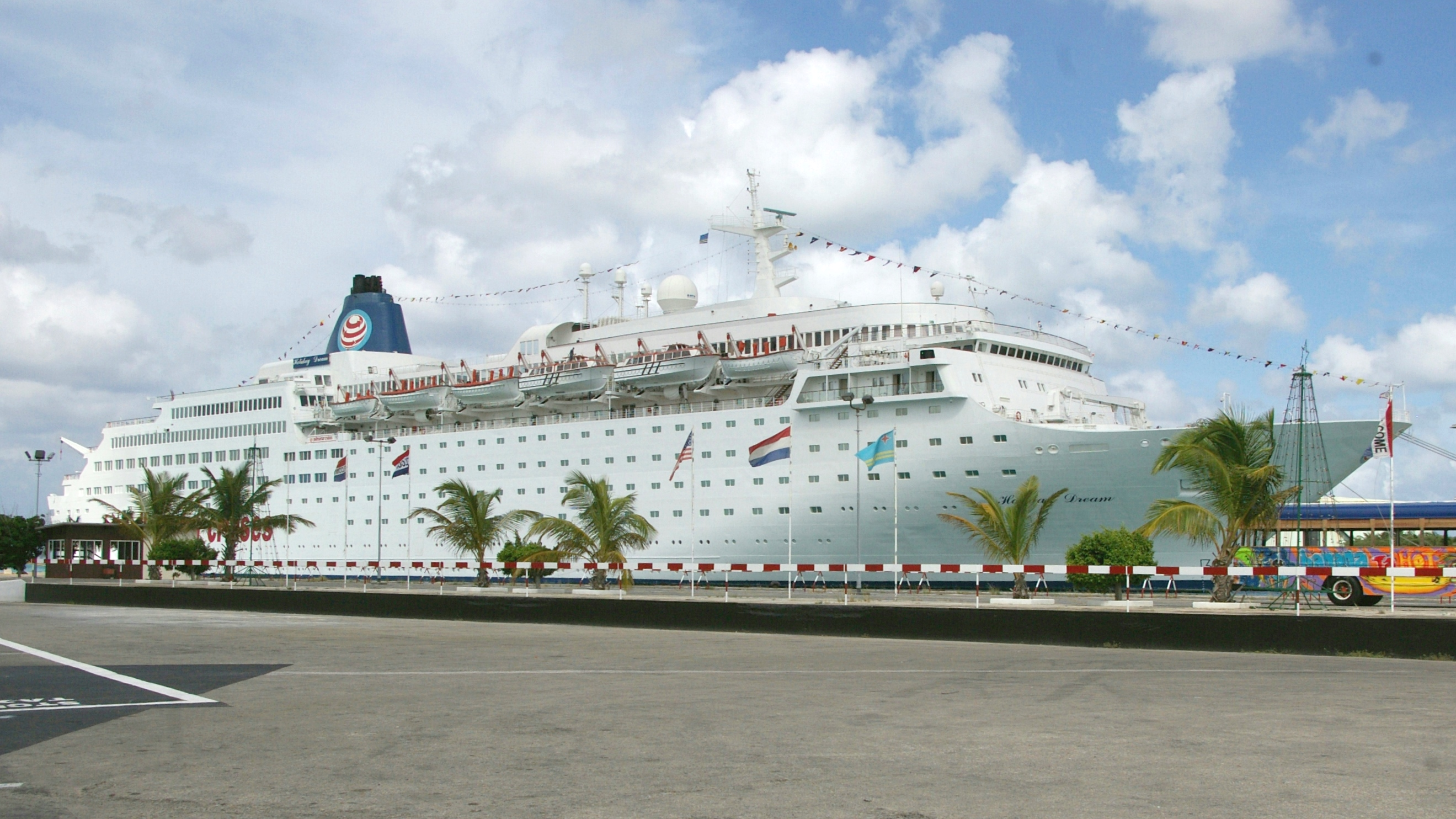
Holiday Dream in Willemstad in 2007.

Pullmantur Cruises renamed the ship Holiday Dream and primarily used her for cruises aimed at a Spanish-speaking clientele. She regularly operated cruises in the Caribbean.

=== Croisières de France ===
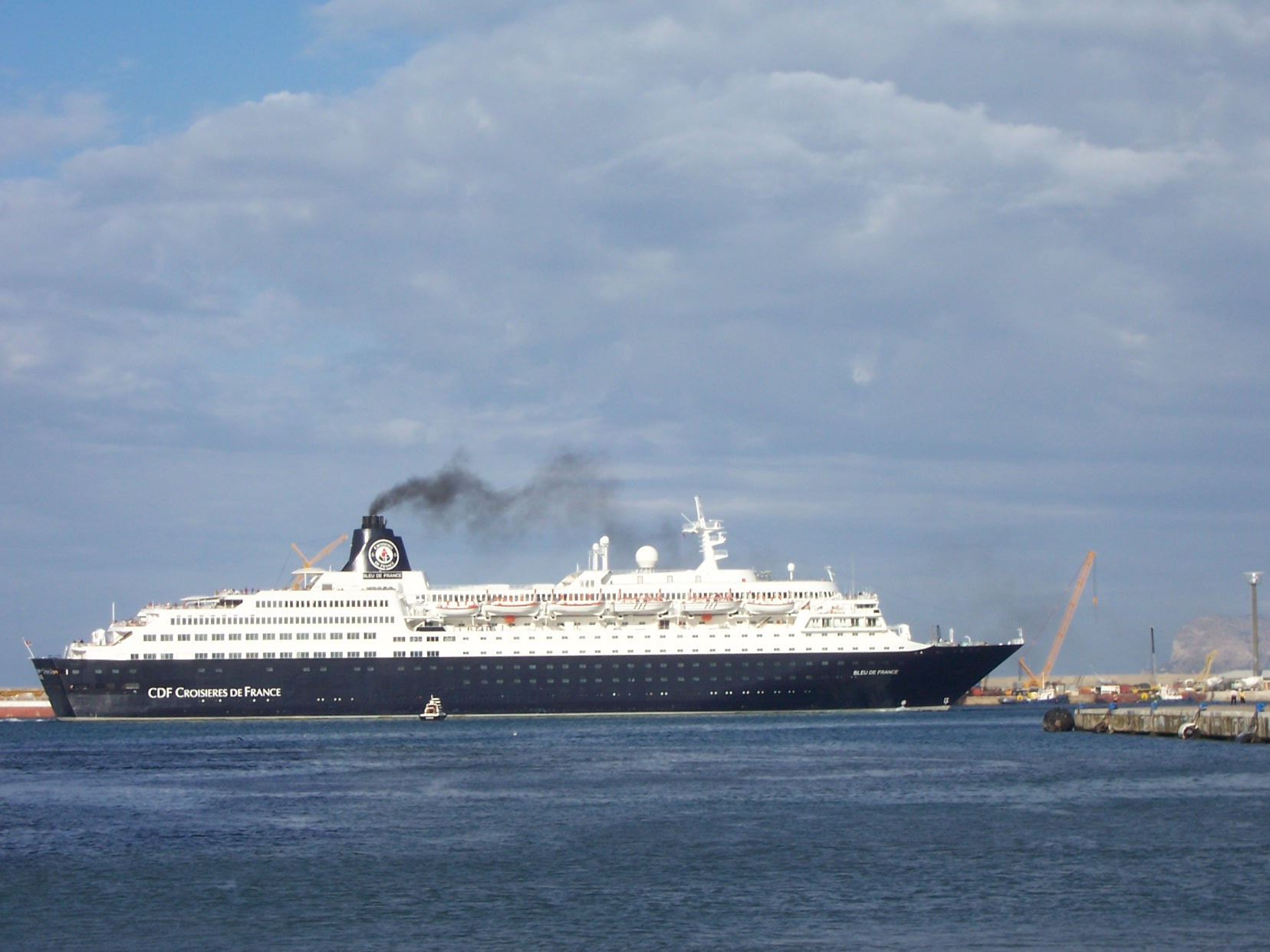
Bleu de France in Palermo in 2010.

In September 2007, Royal Caribbean Cruises Ltd., the new owner of Pullmantur Cruises, made public their plans for establishing Croisières de France, a new cruise line aimed at the French market. Holiday Dream was given a €30 million refit at Barcelona by Finnish MML Shipbuilding in spring 2008, with her interiors refurbished to accommodate French clientele.

Following the refit, the vessel was renamed Bleu de France and entered service as the first ship of the Croisières de France brand. During the northern hemisphere summer season, she operated cruises in the Mediterranean from Marseille, while for the winter season, she offered cruises in the Caribbean from La Romana.

=== Saga Cruises ===
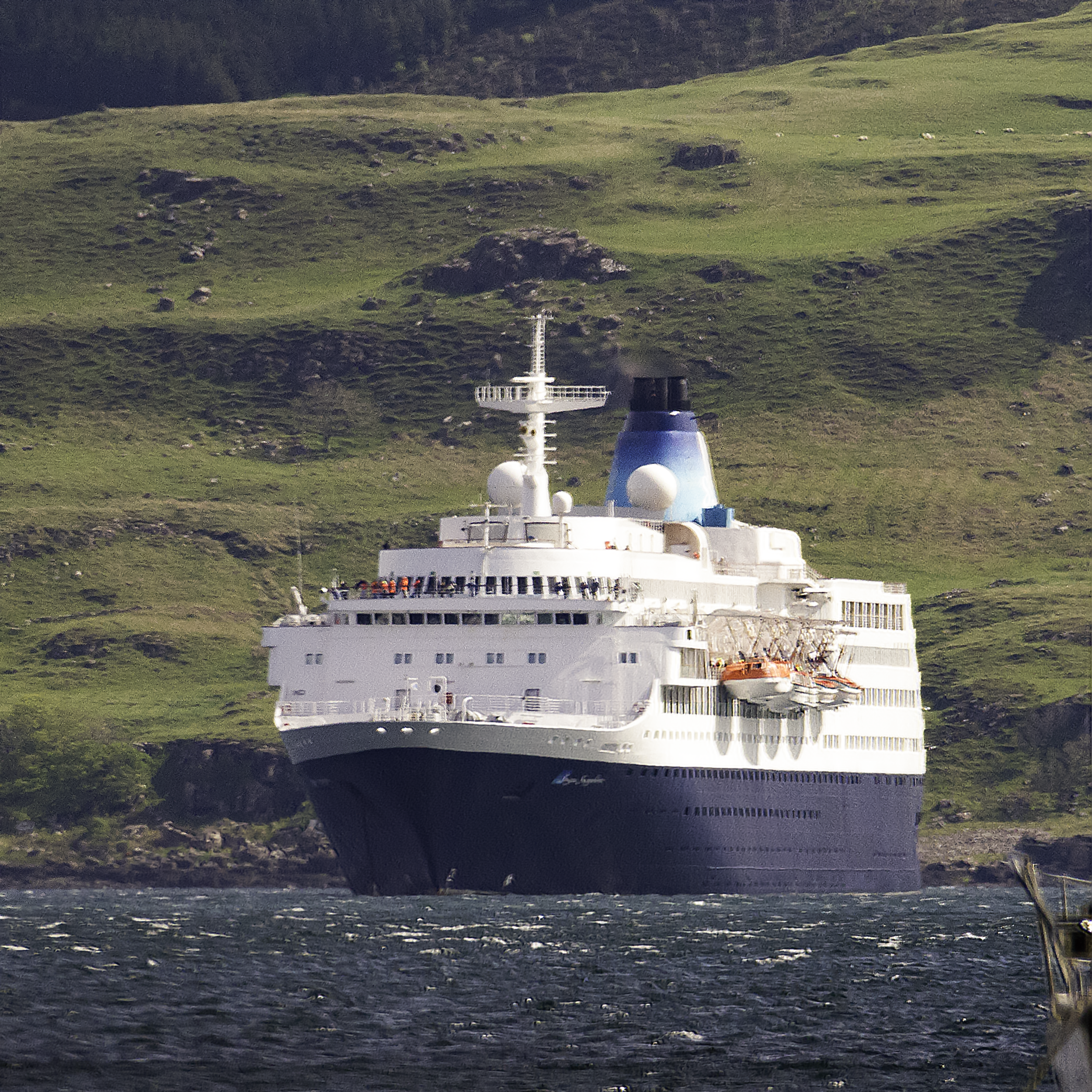
Saga Sapphire off Tobermory, Mull, Scotland in 2014.

British-based Saga Cruises acquired Bleu de France in 2011, after the vessel completed two seasons of cruising for the Brazilian cruise operator CVC.

The ship, renamed Saga Sapphire, received an extensive refit at Fincantieri between November 2011 and March 2012 before joining the Saga fleet. Work included refurbishing the interior, creating new cabins (including additional balcony accommodation to her superstructure), an overhaul of the machinery, and repainting and maintenance of the hull.

During her career with Saga, she experienced several incidents. In April 2012, during her maiden voyage, she suffered an engine failure, forcing Saga to cancel the 16-day voyage. In May 2014, while cruising near the Isle of Mull, in Scotland, an electrical fire aboard the ship knocked out her power supply. Repairs took place to an electrical panel while the ship was anchored off the island in calm seas for a few days.

=== ANEX Tour ===
In August 2019, Turkey-based ANEX Tour had reportedly purchased Saga Sapphire for its first ship to launch its cruise business, with a scheduled debut in mid-2020 from Antalya. In April 2020, Saga's managing director Nigel Banks said Saga's plans to transfer Saga Sapphire to ANEX Tour may be postponed due to the COVID-19 pandemic. On 18 June 2020, the sale was completed and it was announced the ship would debut for ANEX Tour in 2021 as Blue Sapphire.

In June 2023, most of the ship's sailings were cancelled. In July 2024, the ship returned to service.

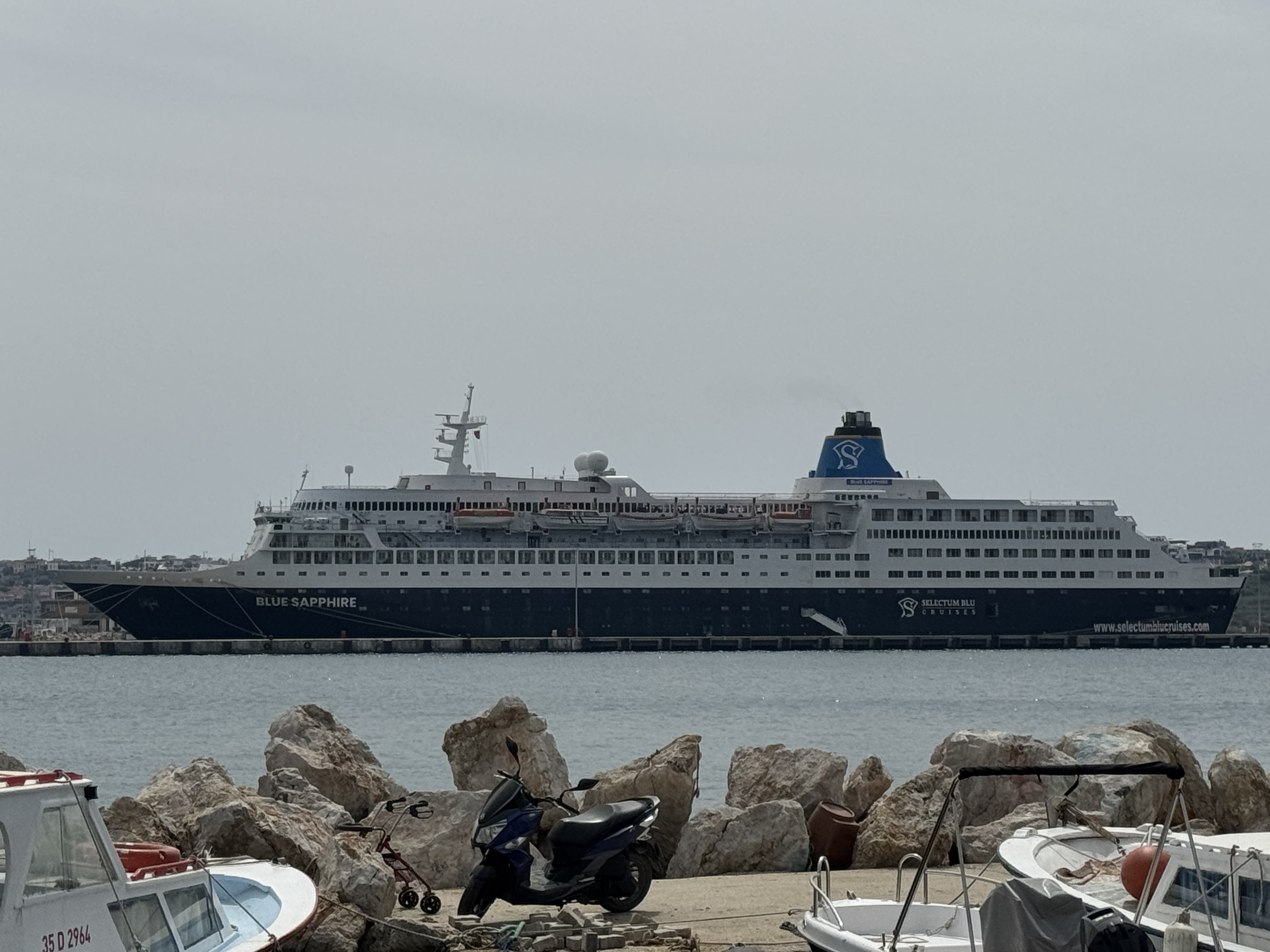
Blue Sapphire in Çeşme.
