= MS Regatta =

Cruise ship built in 1998

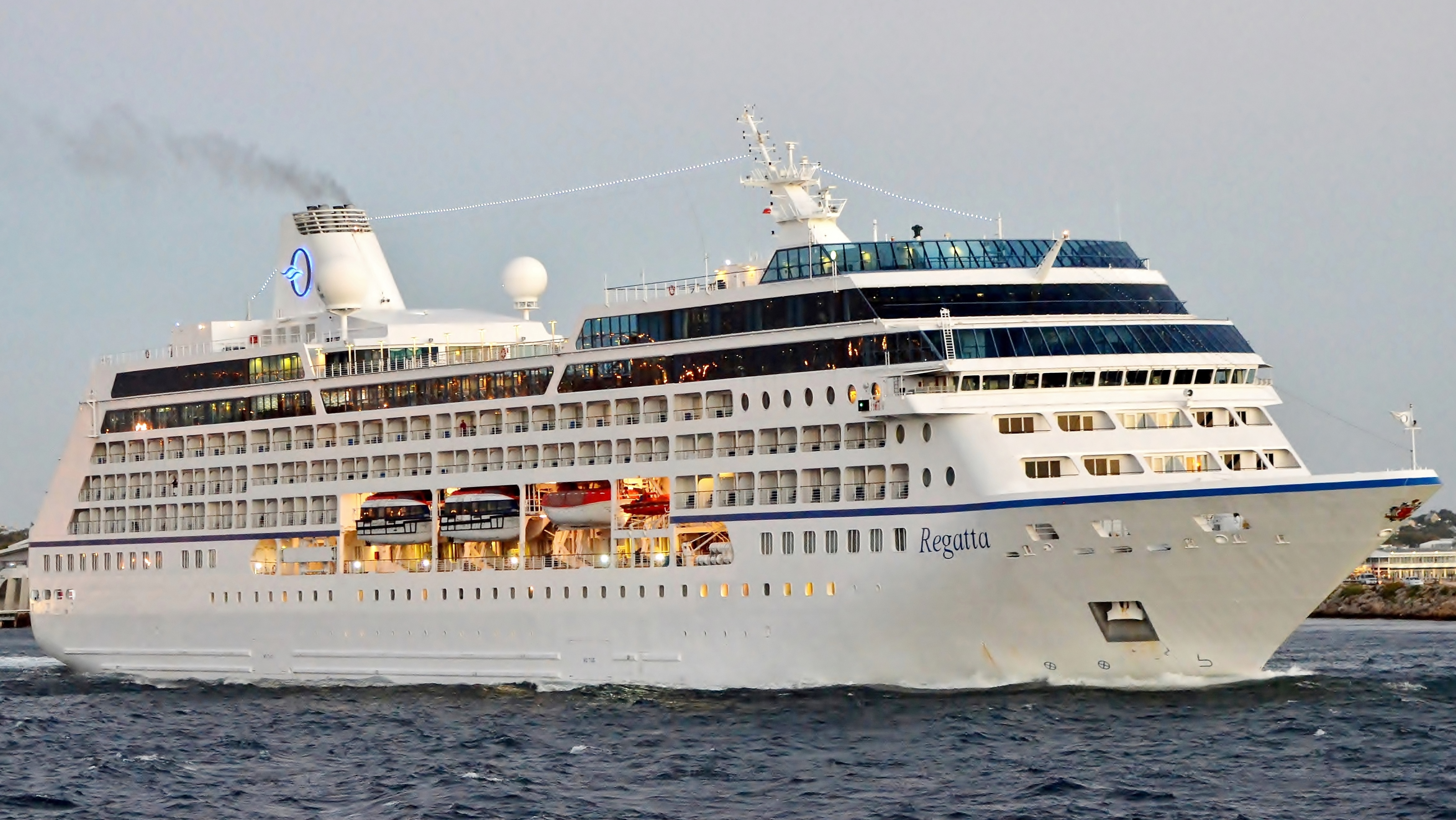
- Regatta in Fremantle, Australia, January 2018

History
- Name: 1998–2002: R Two; 2002–2003: Insignia; 2003—present: Regatta
- Owner: 1998–2001: Renaissance Cruises; 2001–2003: Cruiseinvest; 2003-2026: Norwegian Cruise Line Holdings; 2026 onwards: Ignite Travel Group
- Operator: 1998–2001: Renaissance Cruises; 2001–2002: laid up; 2002–2003: Oceania Cruises; 2003: TMR; 2003—2026: Oceania Cruises; 2026—present: Explorations by Norwegian
- Port of registry: 1998–2001: Monrovia, Liberia; 2001—present: Majuro, Marshall Islands
- Builder: Chantiers de l'Atlantique, St. Nazaire, France
- Cost: £150 million
- Yard number: I31
- Acquired: November 1998
- In service: 1998
- Identification: Call sign: V7DM3; IMO number: 9156474; MMSI number: 538001664
- Status: In service

General characteristics
- Class & type: R-class cruise ship (as built); Regatta-class cruise ship (currently)
- Tonnage: 30,277 GT; 2,700 DWT
- Length: 180.96 m (593 ft 8 in)
- Beam: 25.46 m (83 ft 6 in)
- Draught: 5.95 m (19 ft 6 in)
- Decks: 9 (passenger accessible)
- Installed power: 4 × Wärtsilä 12V32; 13,500 kW (18,100 hp) (combined)
- Propulsion: 2 propellers
- Speed: 18 knots (33 km/h; 21 mph)
- Capacity: 684 passengers (lower berths); 824 passengers (all berths)
- Crew: 386

MS Regatta was built for Renaissance Cruises as an R-class cruise ship, she is owned and operated by Oceania Cruises where she is part of their Regatta class. She was built in 1998 by the Chantiers de l'Atlantique shipyard in St. Nazaire, France, for Renaissance Cruises as R Two. Between 2002 and 2003 she sailed as Insignia before receiving her current name.

== Concept and construction ==
Renaissance Cruises had begun operations in 1989, with a series of eight small luxury cruise ships constructed during the course of the next three years. In the mid-90s the company placed an order for eight identical 30,277 gross tonnage (GT) vessels with Chantiers de l'Atlantique shipyard in France. The first ship in the series, MS R One, was delivered in June 1998, followed by R Two in November of the same year.

== Design ==
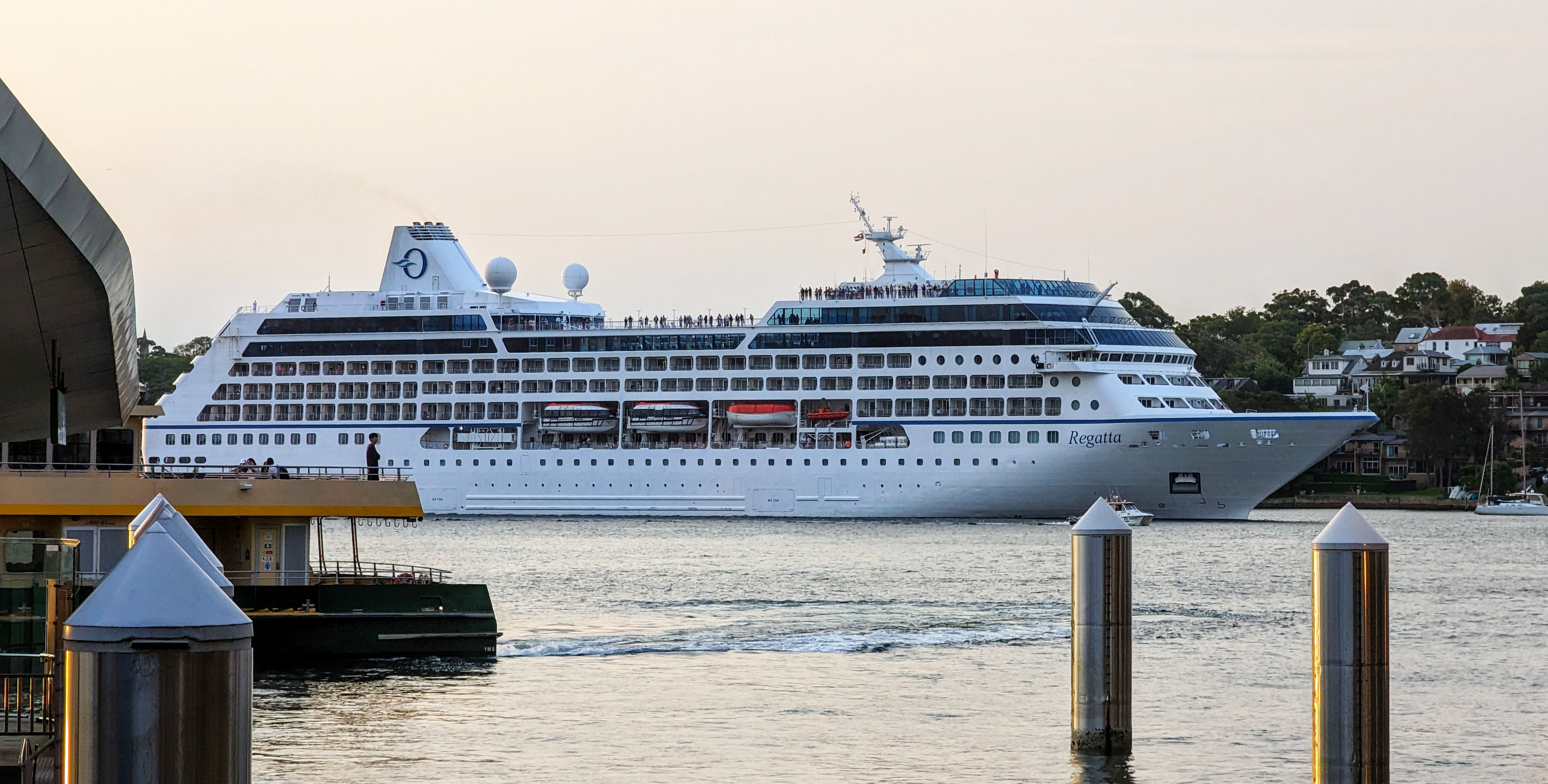
MS Regatta departing White Bay, viewed from Barangaroo ferry wharf

=== Exterior design ===
R Two was built to a somewhat boxy, functional exterior appearance with a large square funnel. In Renaissance Cruises service her hull was painted dark blue, but in Oceania service this was changed to white with a thin blue stripe separating the hull from the superstructure.

=== Interior design ===
The interiors of Regatta are decorated in art deco style similar to the ocean liners of the 1920s and 1930s with polished dark wood and warm colours, described by Douglas Ward, author of the Complete Guide to Cruising and Cruise Ships, as being "stunning and elegant". The ship retains most of her interior decorations from her days with Renaissance Cruises, although the lido area on deck 9 was entirely refurbished before she entered service for Oceania Cruises, while smaller changes were carried out in the cabins and restaurants.

=== Decks ===
Regatta has ten decks.

== Service history ==
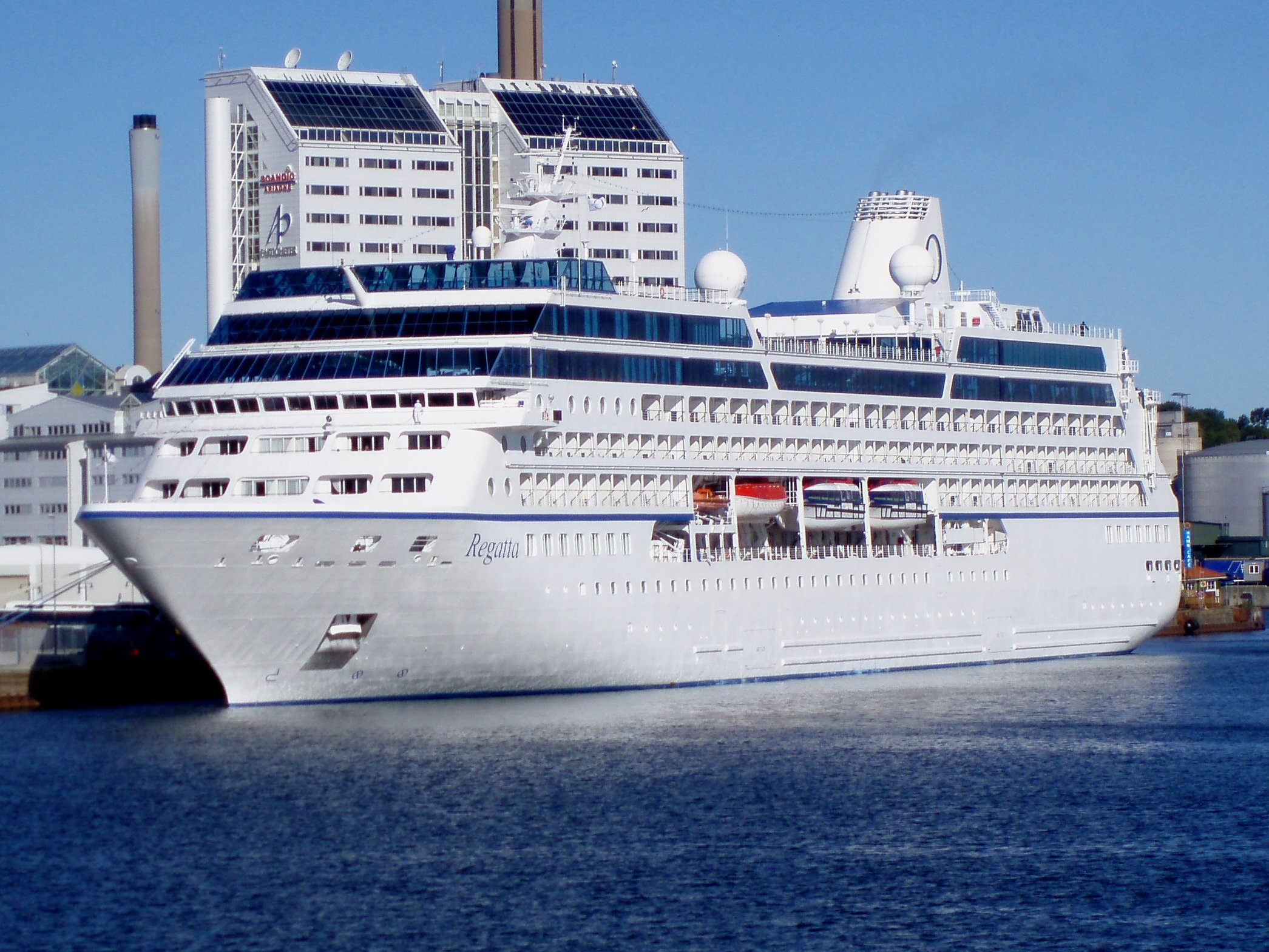
Regatta in Stockholm, Sweden, August 2007

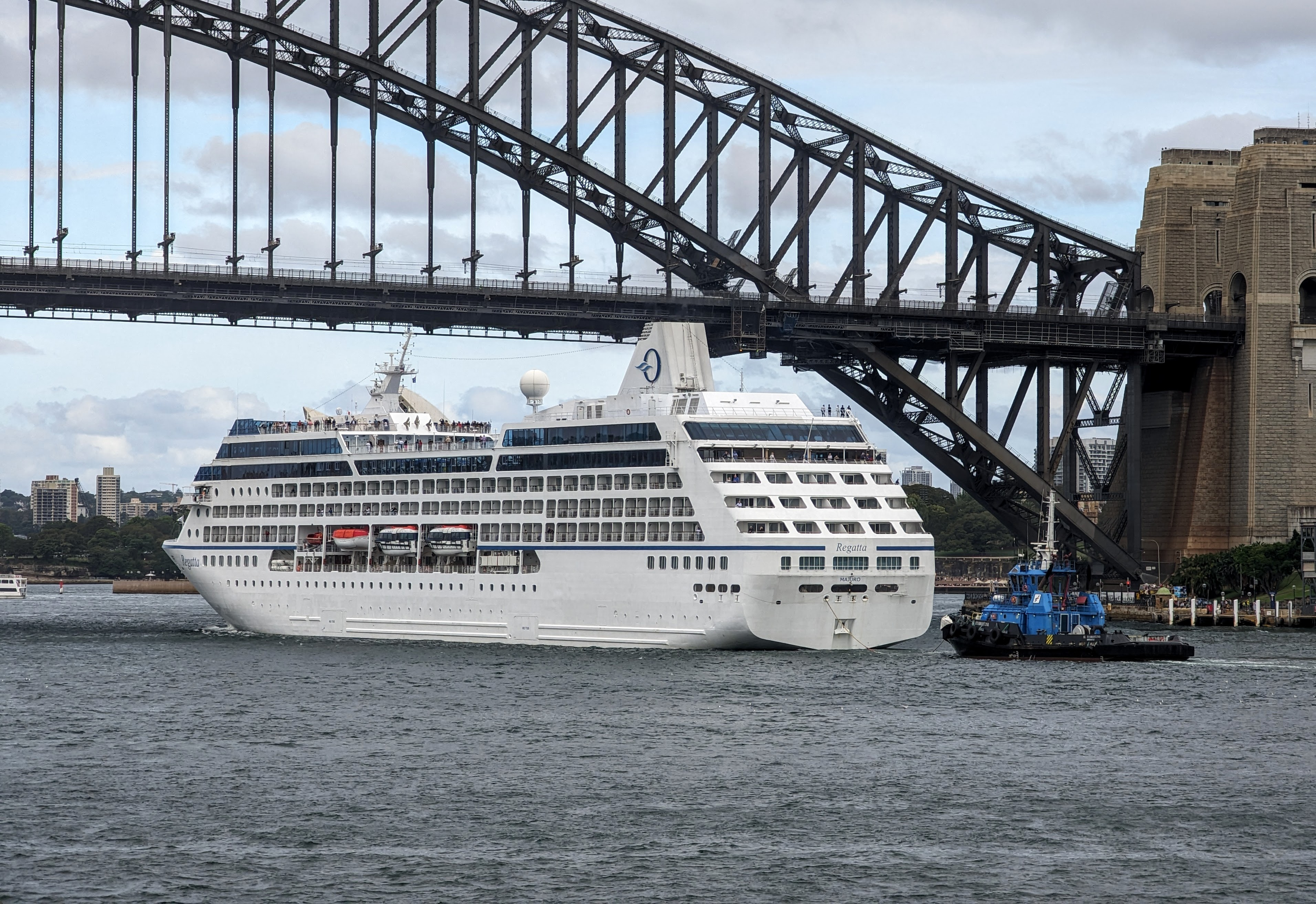
Leaving Sydney after departing White Bay Cruise Terminal, February 2024

Following her delivery to Renaissance Cruises in November 1998, R Two was placed on cruise traffic in the Mediterranean. Renaissance Cruises went bankrupt on September 25, 2001, following September 11, 2001 terrorist attacks, and, on October 7, 2001, the R Two was arrested in Gibraltar and subsequently laid up. Five of her sisters were also laid up in Gibraltar, with only MS R Three and MS R Four absent as they were in the Pacific Ocean at the time of the collapse of Renaissance. In December 2001, R Two and the other former Renaissance ships laid up in Gibraltar were sold to Cruiseinvest, and subsequently moved to Marseille, France, for further layup.

In October 2002, R Two was renamed Insignia, given a $10 million refit and chartered to Oceania Cruises, a new company founded by Frank Del Rio (the former vice president of Renaissance Cruises) and Joe Watters (the former CEO of Crystal Cruises). Between April 19 and June 14, 2003, Insignia was chartered to the French travel agency TMR, who marketed the ship under the name Vaisseau Renaissance (her registered name remained unchanged). On June 15, 2003, the ship returned to Oceania Cruises service, but was renamed Regatta, as the name Insignia had been passed to her sister R One that had also been chartered by Oceania.

Regatta was scheduled to undergo a significant renovation in September 2019 as a part of the company's $100 million OceaniaNEXT program.

Regatta will leave the Oceania Cruises fleet in August 2026, ahead of being delivered to My Cruises’ Explorations by Norwegian brand. As part of a previously announced charter deal, the 684-passenger vessel is scheduled to offer a 368-day world cruise for the Australian tour operator starting in September.
