= Regatta-class cruise ship =

Cruise Ship

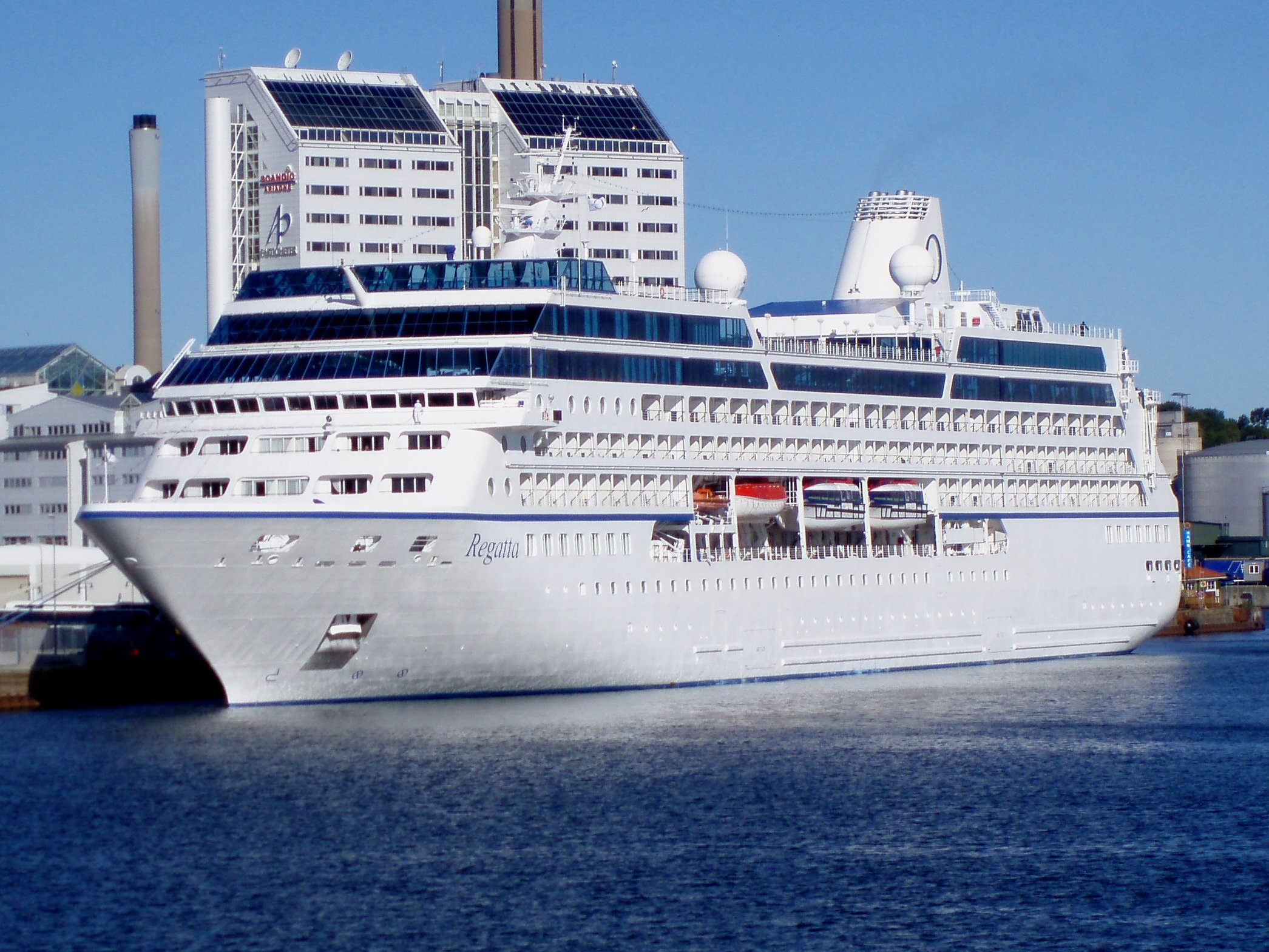
- Regatta in Stockholm, Sweden, August 2007

Class overview
- Builders: Chantiers de l'Atlantique
- Built: 1998–2000
- Planned: 4
- Completed: 4

General characteristics
- Type: Cruise ship
- Tonnage: 30,277 GT

The Regatta class is a class of cruise ships that are owned by Oceania Cruises.

The Regatta-class ships were built in 1998–2000 for Renaissance Cruises as a part of their R class. They have a gross tonnage of 30,277 and can accommodate a maximum of 824 passengers in 343 cabins.

When Oceania Cruises was founded in 2002, they took three of the R-class ships: R One which they rechristened MS Insignia, R Two which they rechristened MS Regatta, and R Five which they rechristened MS Nautica. Oceania referred to these collectively as the Regatta class.

Beginning in April 2012, Insignia began what was initially announced as a two-year lease to Hapag-Lloyd, who is currently operating the ship as MS Columbus 2. It returned to the fleet In 2014. In 2016, The former R Four was christened and entered service for Oceania as Sirena.

| Ship | Built | Entered service for Oceania | Flag | Notes |
|---|---|---|---|---|
| Regatta | 1998 | 2003 | Marshall Islands | Previously R Two, last refurbished in 2011 |
| Insignia | 1998 | 2003 | Marshall Islands | Previously R One and Columbus 2, leased to Hapag-Lloyd, last refurbished in 2014 |
| Nautica | 2000 | 2005 | Marshall Islands | Previously R Five, last refurbished in 2010 |
| Sirena | 1999 | 2016 | Marshall Islands | Previously R Four, Tahitian Princess, and Ocean Princess. |

Note: The R-Class was supposed to be ships for Princess Cruises and they would operate as expedition ships for Princess Expeditions.
