= Seven Seas Navigator =

Cruise ship of Regent Seven Seas Cruises

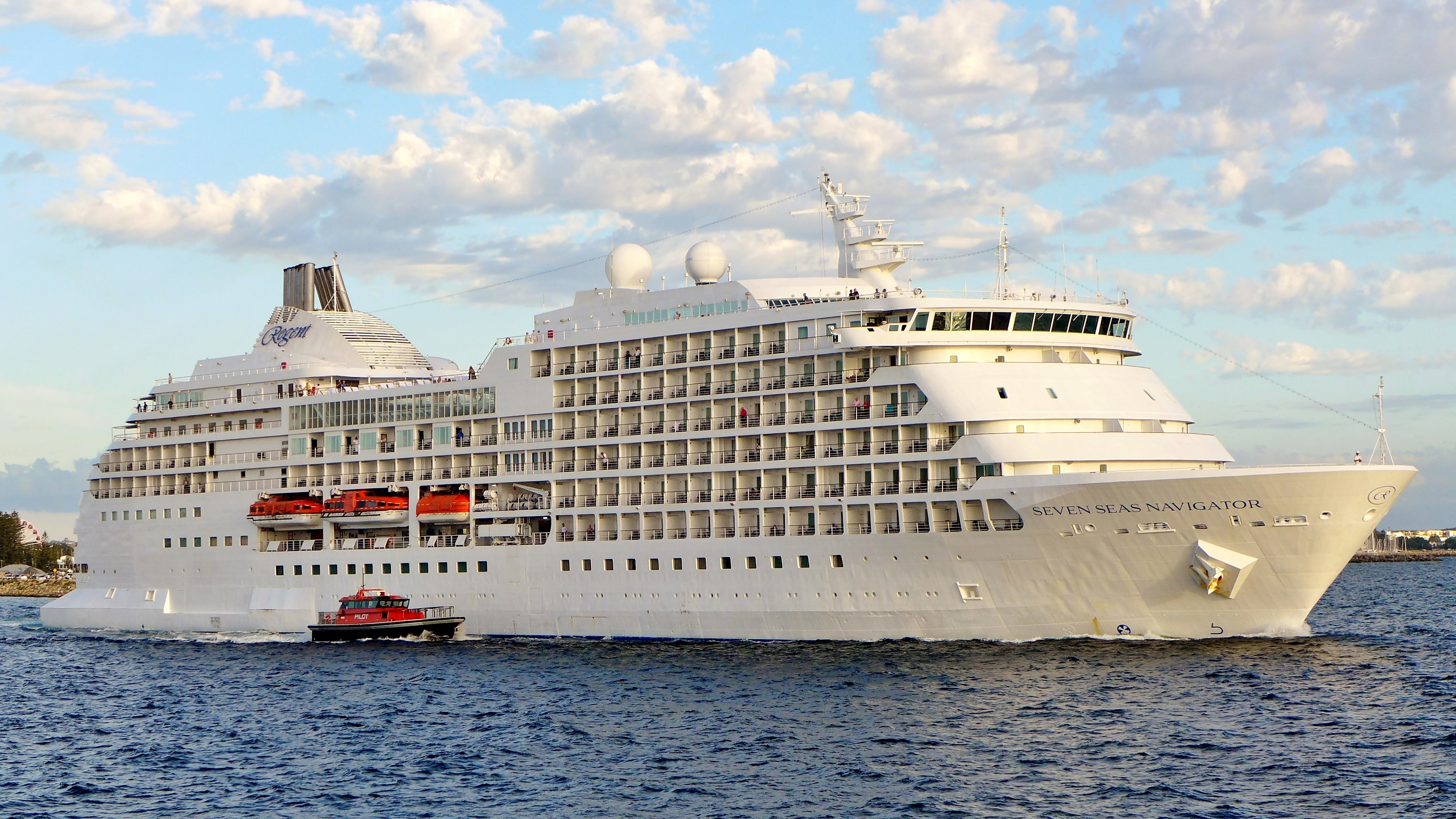
- Seven Seas Navigator in February 2018

History
- Name: Seven Seas Navigator (1999-2028); Avora Lumina (2028 - onwards)
- Owner: Radisson Seven Seas Cruises (1999–2006); Regent Seven Seas Cruises (2006–2028); Avora Residences (2028 - onwards)
- Operator: Radisson Seven Seas Cruises (1999–2006); Regent Seven Seas Cruises (2006–2028); Avora Residences (2028 - onwards)
- Port of registry: 1999–2006: Nassau, (The Bahamas); 2006–2011: Hamilton, (Bermuda); 2011–present: Nassau, (The Bahamas)
- Builder: Admiralty Shipyard, Leningrad, Soviet Union (hull); T. Mariotti, Genoa, Italy (superstructure and outfitting)
- Yard number: 6125
- Laid down: 12 April 1988
- Launched: 23 August 1991
- Completed: 25 August 1999
- Identification: Call sign: C6ZI9; DNV ID: 29871; IMO number: 9064126; MMSI number: 311050600
- Status: In service

General characteristics
- Type: Cruise ship
- Tonnage: 28,550 GT; 9,839 NT; 3,342 DWT
- Length: 170.69 m (560 ft 0 in)
- Beam: 24.8 m (81 ft 4 in)
- Height: 39 m (127 ft 11 in)
- Draft: 7.3 m (23 ft 11 in)
- Depth: 12.3 m (40 ft 4 in)
- Decks: 13 (8 passenger decks)
- Installed power: 4 × Wärtsilä 8L38
- Propulsion: Two controllable pitch propellers
- Speed: 19.5 knots (36.1 km/h; 22.4 mph)
- Capacity: 490 passengers
- Crew: 340

Seven Seas Navigator is a luxury cruise ship operated by Regent Seven Seas Cruises (RSSC). She entered service for Radisson Seven Seas Cruises in 1999. Ninety percent of her cabins have their own private verandas. The hull was constructed in the USSR for use as a satellite tracking ship. The hull was purchased by RSSC and the superstructure was finished by Mariotti Yards, Italy.

== Construction ==
The vessel was laid down in Leningrad, Soviet Union as Akademik Nikolay Pilyugin, a Russian ship capable of tracking satellites. However, by November 1993, as a consequence of the fall of the Soviet Union, construction was suspended. The unfinished hull was later sold to V-Ships.

== History ==
In 2004, the ship was featured and used as a focal point for the movie After the Sunset. The movie starred Pierce Brosnan and Salma Hayek.

In early 2006, Radisson Seven Seas Cruises re-branded as Regent Seven Seas Cruises. Seven Seas Navigator continued to sail under the brand Regent Seven Seas Cruises. Seven Seas Navigator underwent a $40 million refurbishment in March/April 2016 that upgraded the common areas and suites.

During the COVID-19 pandemic, on 21 May 2020, it was reported that a female crew member aboard Seven Seas Navigator had tested positive for SARS-CoV-2, and that a second crew member was also showing symptoms of the virus. The ship had subsequently requested entry to the Port of Barcelona, and the Ministry of Health granted them an exception to do so. After docking, both sick crew members were given serological tests, and both returned positive. (Note: They were also given polymerase chain reaction tests, but no results appeared to have been reported as of 23 May 2020.) Both crew members were isolated, and the rest of the roughly 450 crew members of the ship were placed under quarantine.

The holding company Norwegian Cruise Line Holdings chartered the ship and Insignia to Crescent Seas in 2025. The vessel will leave RSSC in 2026.

It was announced in November 2025, Crescent Seas would no long charter the ship, moving forward with a new build. Seven Seas Navigator will remain in the fleet and will receive a multi-million dollar refurbishment
