= Seven Seas Explorer =

Cruise ship operated by Regent Seven Seas Cruises

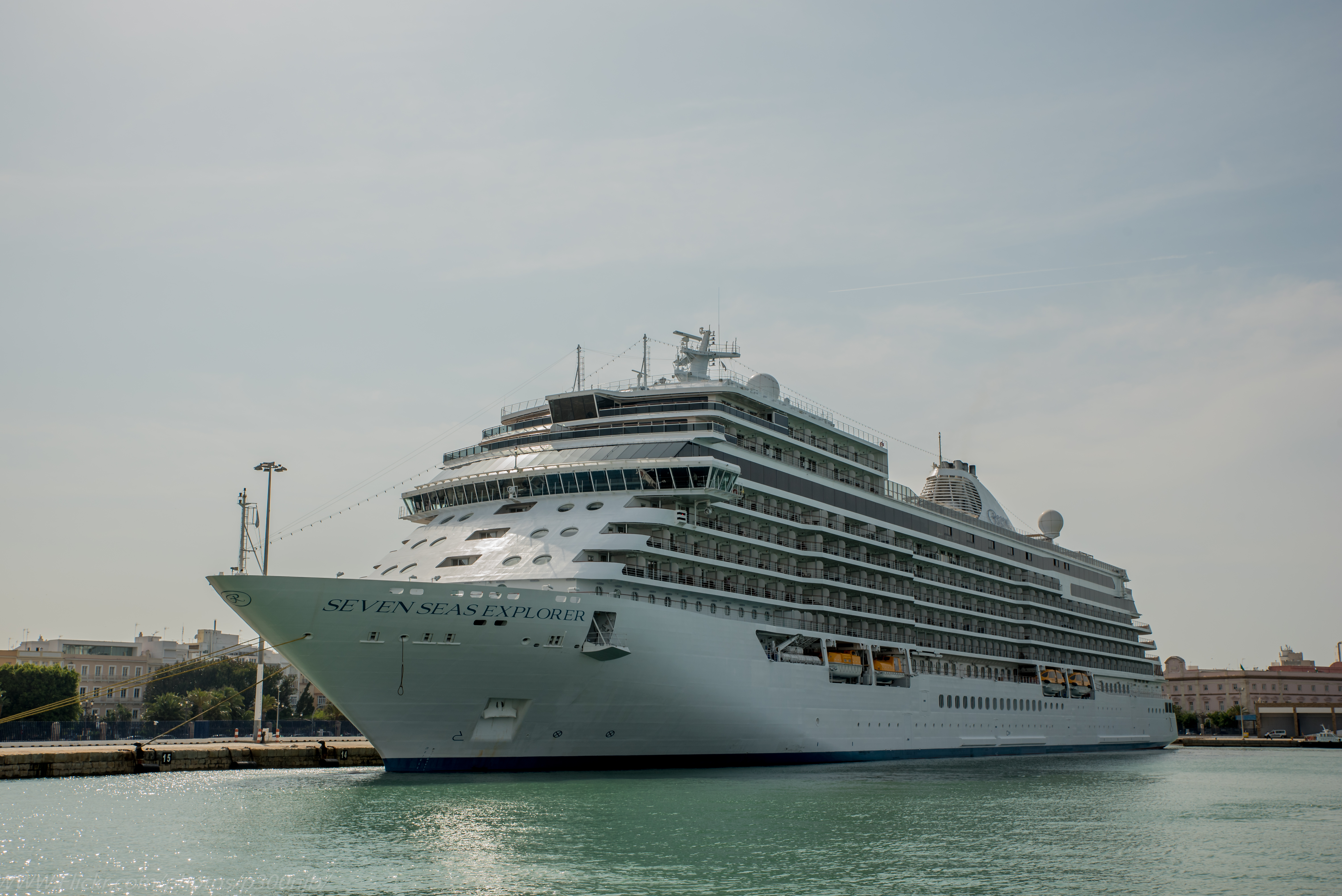
- Seven Seas Explorer in Cádiz, 2017

History
- Name: Seven Seas Explorer
- Owner: Norwegian Cruise Line Holdings
- Operator: Regent Seven Seas Cruises
- Port of registry: Majuro, Marshall Islands
- Ordered: 10 July 2013
- Builder: Fincantieri, Sestri Ponente, Genova
- Yard number: 6250
- Laid down: 21 January 2015
- Launched: 30 October 2015
- Sponsored by: Charlene, Princess of Monaco
- Christened: 13 July 2016
- Completed: 30 June 2016
- In service: July 2016—present
- Identification: Call sign: V7QK9; IMO number: 9703150; MMSI number: 538006712
- Status: In service

General characteristics
- Class & type: Explorer-class cruise ship
- Tonnage: 55,254 GT
- Length: 223.6 m (734 ft)
- Beam: 31 m (102 ft)
- Draught: 7.02 m (23.0 ft)
- Decks: 13 total decks; 10 passenger decks
- Installed power: 4 × MaK 8M43C Diesel generators producing 8,000 kW (11,000 hp) each; Total Installed Power: 32,000 kW (43,000 hp)
- Propulsion: 2 × 9,000 kW (12,000 hp) Wärtsilä
- Speed: Service speed: 19.4 knots (35.9 km/h; 22.3 mph); Maximum: 20.5 knots (38.0 km/h; 23.6 mph)
- Capacity: 750 passengers
- Crew: 552 crewmembers

Seven Seas Explorer is an Explorer-class cruise ship currently operated by Regent Seven Seas Cruises, a subsidiary of Norwegian Cruise Line Holdings. Debuting in 2016, she became the first new-build ship for Regent in more than a decade and the fourth largest ship to ever operate for Regent.

== History ==
=== Planning ===
On 10 July 2013, Regent Seven Seas Cruises announced it had entered into a contract with Italian shipbuilder, Fincantieri, to build a new vessel named Seven Seas Explorer. The ship was initially designed to house 738 passengers, a 5% increase in passenger capacity over existing Regent vessels at the time, and would also be 12% larger, at 54,000 GT, providing more space per passenger. As on Seven Seas Voyager and Seven Seas Mariner, Regent intended to make Seven Seas Explorer an all-suite ship. The order for the ship reportedly cost US$450 million, with each berth costing over US$600,000, and was scheduled to debut in the summer of 2016. The debut of Seven Seas Explorer would reportedly mark an increase in Regent's capacity by up to 40%.

=== Construction ===
On 15 July 2014, Regent celebrated the steel cutting of the new ship at Fincantieri's yard in Sestri Ponente, near Genoa.

On 21 January 2015, a coin ceremony was performed for the laying of the ship's keel. Three different coins were welded into the keel: a 1921 Peace dollar, a 1959 Italian lira, and a commemorative coin minted for the ceremony.

On 30 October 2015, Seven Seas Explorer floated out from the dry dock at the shipyard following completion of her exterior outfitting. The remainder of the construction was completed with the ship in wet dock.

=== Delivery and christening ===
Seven Seas Explorer was delivered to Regent on 30 June 2016. She was christened in Monte Carlo by Charlene, Princess of Monaco on 13 July 2016.

=== In media ===
- The World's Most Expensive Cruise Ship Channel 5

== Design and specifications ==
Seven Seas Explorer currently features a total of 377 passenger cabins, all of which are suite accommodations. There are also a total of 325 crew cabins, making for a total capacity of 1,360 passengers and crew. She currently has 13 decks, a length of 223.6 metres (734 ft), a draft of 7.02 metres (23.0 ft), and a beam of 31 metres (102 ft). She is powered by a diesel-electric genset system, with four total MaK engines, producing a total output of 32 megawatts (43,000 hp). Main propulsion is via two Wärtsilä propellers, each driven by a 9 megawatts (12,000 hp) electric motor. The system gives the vessel a service speed of 19.4 knots (35.9 km/h; 22.3 mph) and a maximum speed of 20.5 knots (38.0 km/h; 23.6 mph).

The ship features all-inclusive dining establishments, including a steakhouse, a main dining room, and a convertible buffet-restaurant. There is also a two-level theater and different lounges, including an observation lounge and a music lounge. There are multiple suite categories among the offered accommodations, with each category of cabin showcasing different layouts and design elements, as well as including verandas with every cabin.

== Service history ==
=== Deployments ===
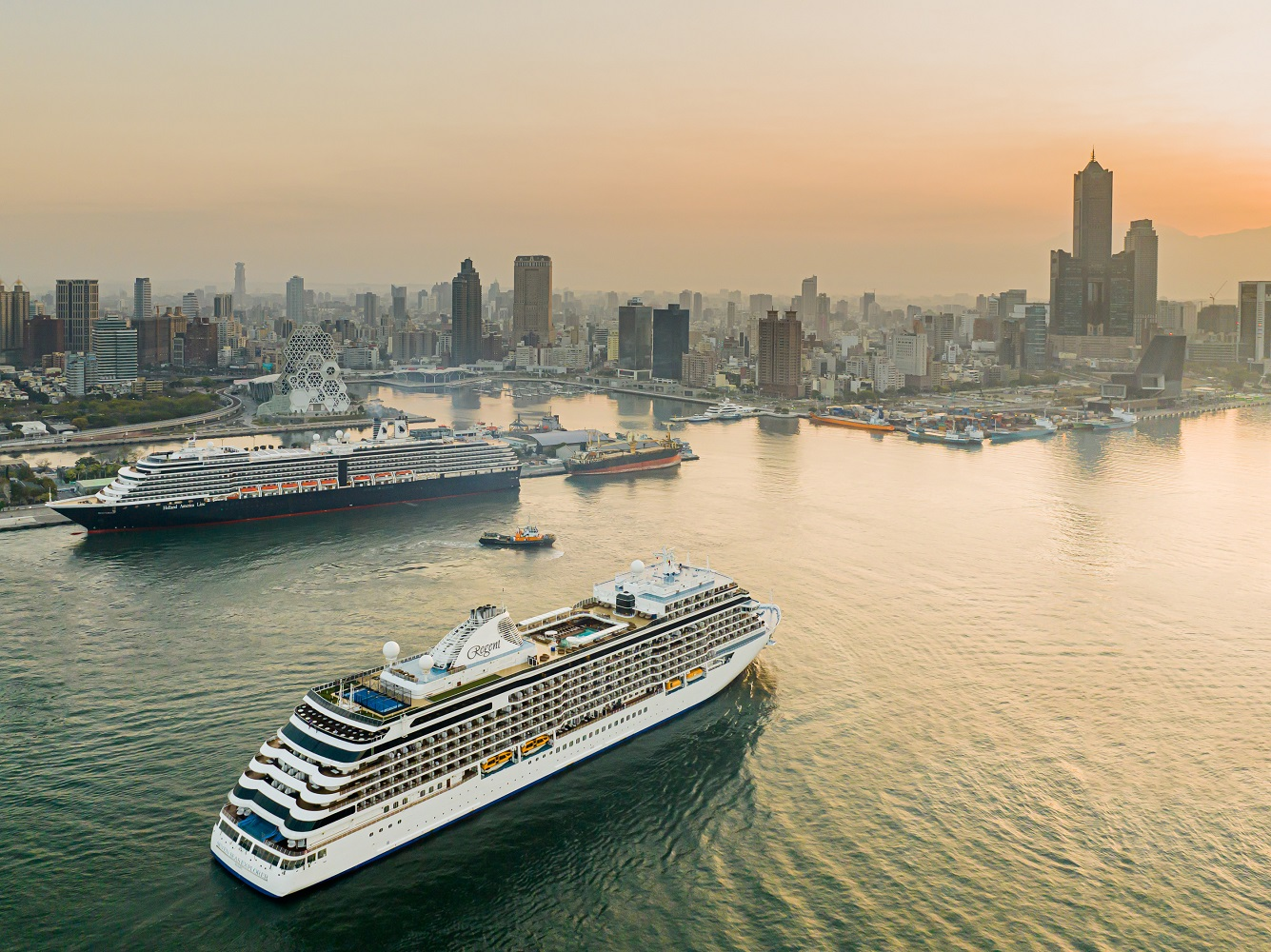
Seven Seas Explorer in Kaohsiung, Taiwan in 2023

Seven Seas Explorer set sail on her 14-night maiden voyage on 20 July 2016 from Monte Carlo to Venice. The ship spent her inaugural season sailing in the Mediterranean, before re-positioning to Miami for cruises in the Caribbean. Since then, Seven Seas Explorer has also visited ports in Northern Europe, Africa, and South America.

As of February 2020, Seven Seas Explorer was sailing Caribbean voyages and Panama Canal transits, and re-positioned to Europe in April, sailing Northern Europe and Mediterranean itineraries. In the latter half of 2020, she was to debut in Asia, and sail her maiden Alaska season in the summer of 2021, however, these voyages were disrupted by the COVID-19 pandemic and the subsequent suspension of cruises embarking through September 2021. The ship had also been due to sail in Oceania in the winter of 2021.
