= MS Insignia =

R class cruise ship

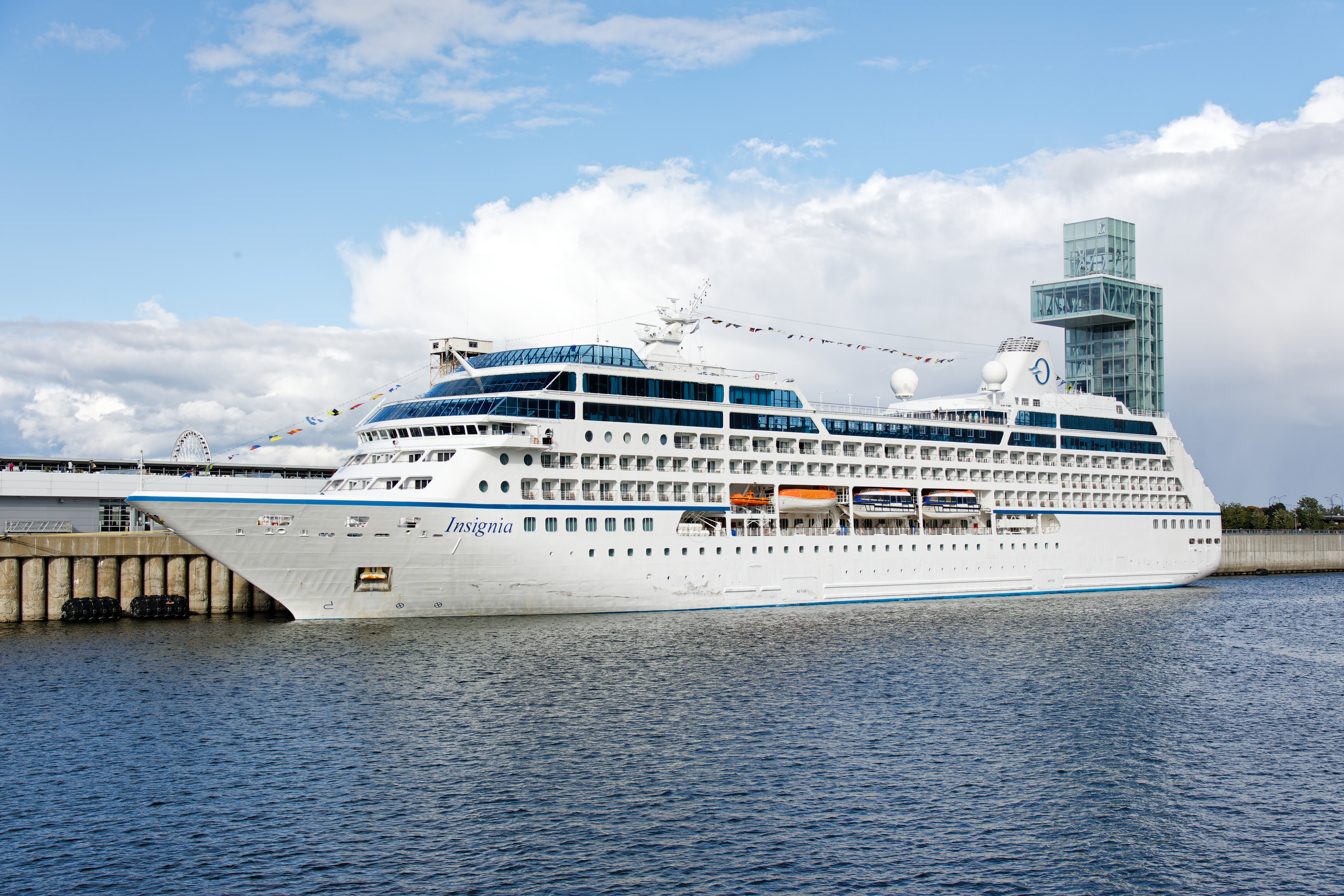
- Insignia in Montreal, October 2023

History
- Name: R One (1998–2003); Insignia (2004–2012); Columbus 2 (2012–2014); Insignia (2014–present)
- Owner: Renaissance Cruises (1998–2001); Cruiseinvest (2001–2006); Oceania Cruises (2006–2012); Hapag-Lloyd (2012–2014); Oceania Cruises (2014–present)
- Operator: Renaissance Cruises (1998–2001); laid up (2001–2002); Oceania Cruises (2003–2012); Hapag-Lloyd Cruises (2012–2014); Oceania Cruises (2014–present)
- Port of registry: Monrovia, Liberia (1998–2001); Majuro, Marshall Islands (2001–present)
- Builder: Chantiers de l'Atlantique, St. Nazaire, France
- Cost: GB£150 million
- Yard number: H31
- Launched: 24 January 1998
- Completed: 1998
- Acquired: November 1998
- In service: 1998
- Identification: Call sign: V7DM2; IMO number: 9156462; MMSI number: 538001663
- Status: Operational

General characteristics
- Class & type: R-class cruise ship (as built); Regatta-class cruise ship (present)
- Tonnage: 30,277 GT; 2,700 DWT
- Length: 180.45 m (592 ft 0 in)
- Beam: 25.73 m (84 ft 5 in)
- Draught: 5.95 m (19 ft 6 in)
- Decks: 9 (passenger accessible)
- Installed power: 4 × Wärtsilä 12V32 diesels; combined 13,500 kW (18,100 hp)
- Propulsion: 2 propellers
- Speed: 18 knots (33 km/h; 21 mph)
- Capacity: 698 passengers (lower berths); 824 passengers (all berths)
- Crew: 400

MS Insignia is the lead ship of the R class of cruise ships built for Renaissance Cruises. She is now owned by Oceania Cruises as part of its Regatta class of ships, but recently sailed for Hapag-Lloyd as the Columbus 2. She was built in 1998 by the Chantiers de l'Atlantique shipyard in St. Nazaire, France for Renaissance Cruises as MS R One. On 11 December 2014, three crew members died in a fire that broke out in the engine room when the ship was docked at Saint Lucia.

== Concept and construction ==
Renaissance Cruises had begun operations in 1989, with a series of eight small luxury cruise ships constructed during the course of the next three years. In the mid-90s the company placed an order for eight identical 30,277 GT vessels with Chantiers de l'Atlantique shipyard in France. The first ship in the series, MS R One, was delivered in June 1998, followed by R Two in November of the same year.

MS Insignia is scheduled to undergo a significant renovation as a part of the company's $100 million OceaniaNEXT program. The refurbished cruise ship will debut in December 2018.

== Lease to Hapag-Lloyd ==
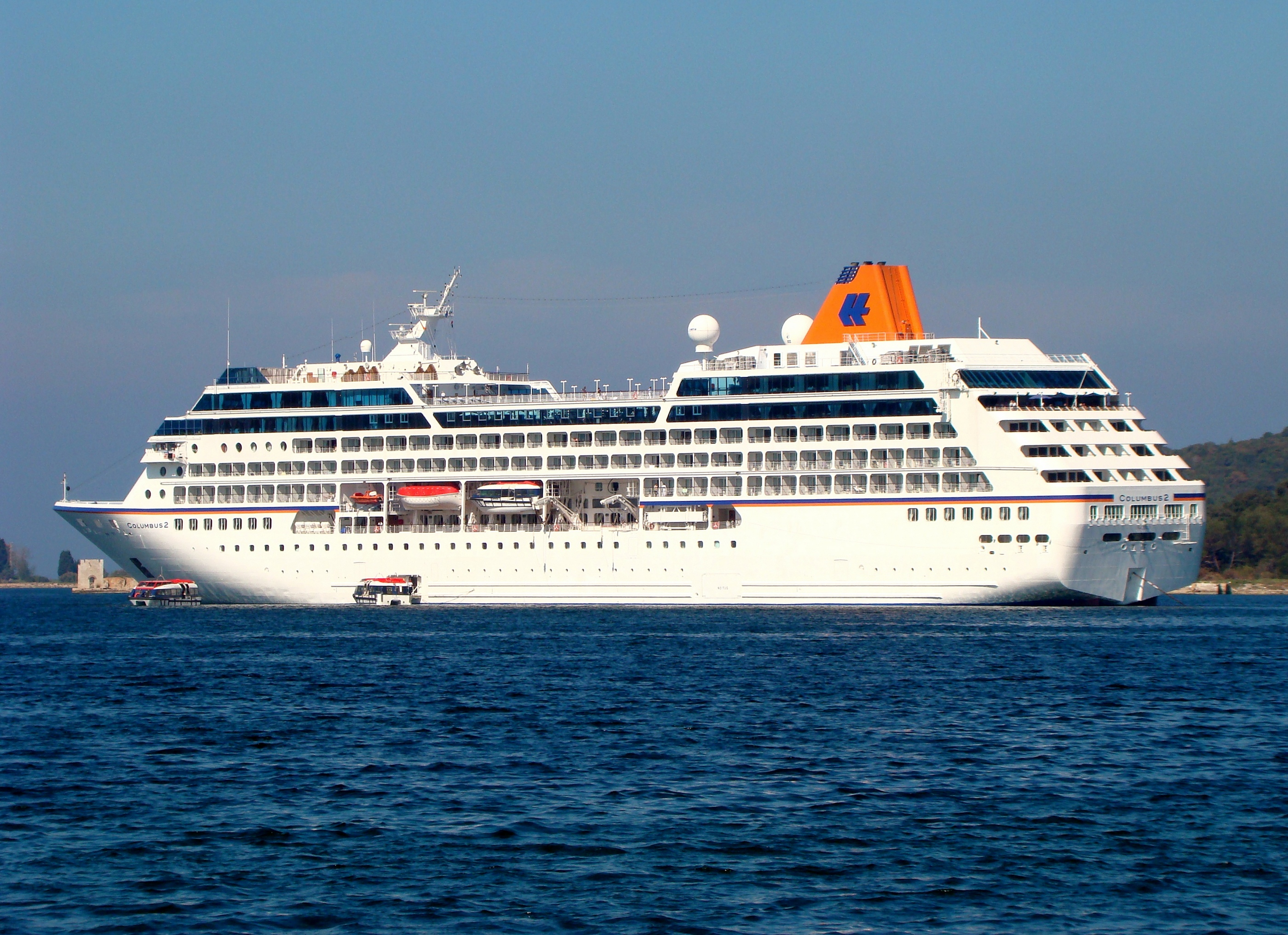
MS Columbus 2 in Pula, Croatia, May 2012

Beginning in April 2012, MS Insignia began what was initially announced as a two-year lease to Hapag-Lloyd, which renamed the ship Columbus 2.

Hapag-Lloyd decided that after 2014 they would not renew the charter of the Columbus 2, in favor of focusing their luxury product. Insignia rejoined the Oceania fleet on 31 May 2014.

== Engine fire ==
On 11 December 2014 whilst alongside in Castries, St. Lucia, Insignia experienced a major fire in her engine room. Two Wartsila N.A. field service engineers and one crew member, working in the engine room at the time, lost their lives. The resulting damages made it necessary to end the voyage started just 4 days prior in Miami. All passengers were disembarked and flown to their home towns. After minor repairs to restore power, MS Insignia was towed to San Juan, Puerto Rico where she was fully repaired.

The ship was back in service by 22 March 2015 to start a world cruise from Singapore. The delayed departure date for the cruise resulted in a heavily modified itinerary, although many of the principal cruise destinations were still visited.

== Sale ==
The Holding Company Norwegian Cruise Line Holdings chartered her and the Seven Seas Navigator to Crescent Seas in 2025. She will join the fleet in the end of 2027.

It was announced in November 2025, Crescent Seas would no long charter the ship, moving forward with a new build. Insignia will remain in the fleet.
