= MS Marina =

Cruise ship

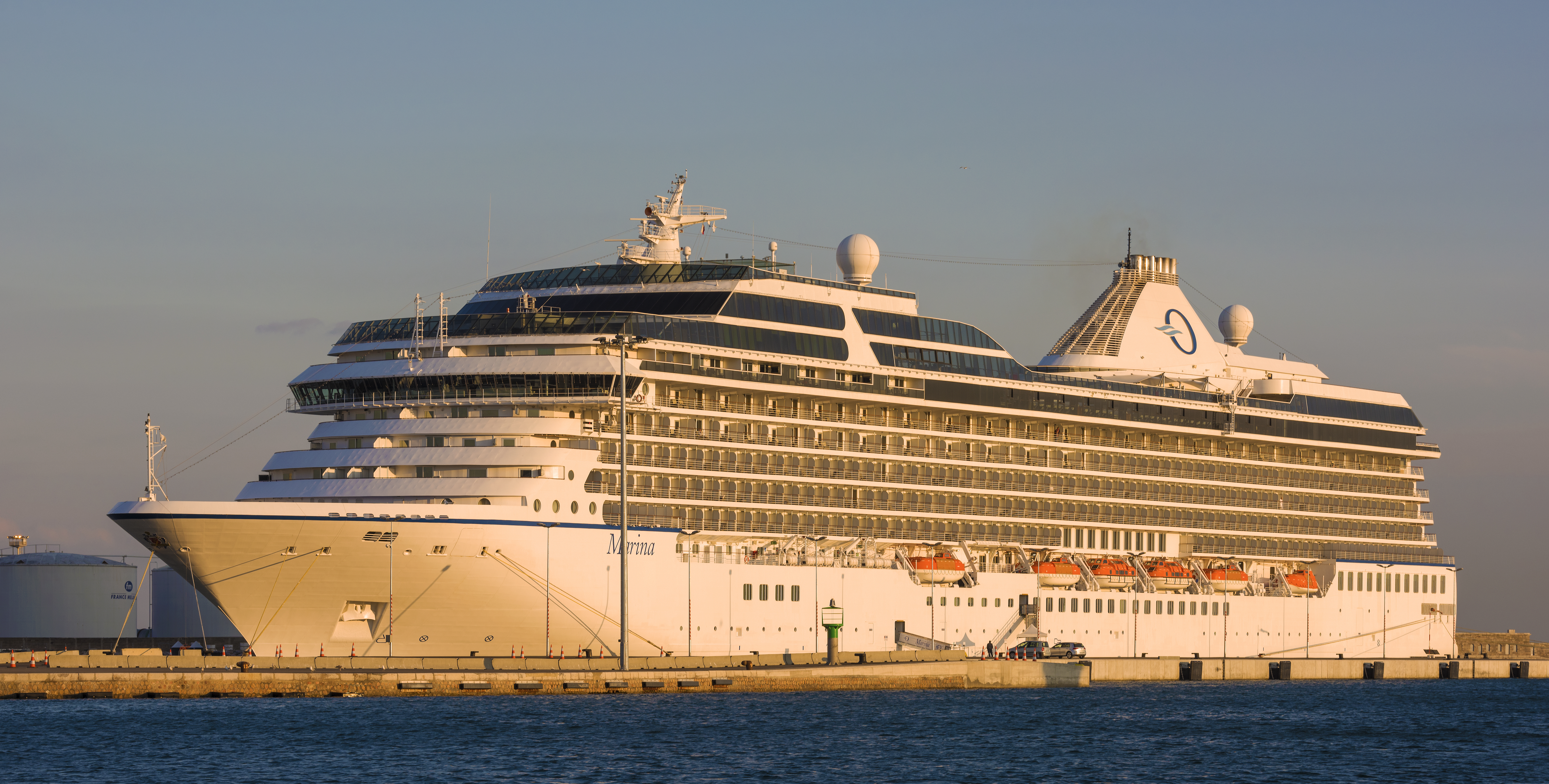
- MS Marina docked in Sète, October 2015

History
- Name: Marina
- Owner: Oceania Cruises
- Port of registry: Majuro, Marshall Islands
- Ordered: 2007
- Builder: Fincantieri Sestri Ponente
- Yard number: 6194
- Laid down: 10 March 2009
- Launched: 4 April 2010
- Completed: 19 January 2011
- Maiden voyage: 22 January 2011
- Identification: IMO number: 9438066; MMSI number: 538003668
- Status: In active service

General characteristics
- Class & type: Oceania-class cruise ship
- Tonnage: 66,084 GT
- Length: 782 ft (238.35 m)
- Beam: 105 ft (32.00 m)
- Draught: 24 ft (7.32 m)
- Installed power: 2 x 12,600 kW Wartsila 12V46C 2 x 8,400 kW Wartsila 8L46C
- Propulsion: 2 x 12 MW Electric motors affixed to fixed pitch propellers 2 x 2,200 kW bow thrusters 1 x 1,900 kW stern thruster
- Speed: 20 knots (37 km/h)
- Capacity: 1,250 passengers (double occupancy)
- Crew: 780 crew

MS Marina is an Oceania-class cruise ship, which was constructed at Fincantieri's Sestri Ponente yards in Italy for Oceania Cruises. Marina is the first in a duo of cruise ships, and was followed by MS Riviera in May 2012. The option for the third ship was declined. The ship was named in Miami by Mary Hart on 5 February 2011.

== Concept and construction ==
The finalization of contract for the construction of Marina and her sister ship, plus an option for a third, was reached on 18 June 2007. Marina was designed by Norwegian architectural firm Yran & Storbraaten (Y&S). The keel of Marina was laid on 10 March 2009 and included the welding of a U.S. silver dollar coin and a pre-Castro Cuban peso coin in the keel, which according to shipbuilding tradition is believed to bring fortune to the ship, its passengers and crew during their seagoing life. Marina has a diesel-electric powerplant with a pair of fixed pitch propellers.

The ship measures 66,084 gross tons and has the capacity for 1,250 passengers at double occupancy.
