= Seven Seas Mariner =

Cruise ship of Regent Seven Seas Cruises

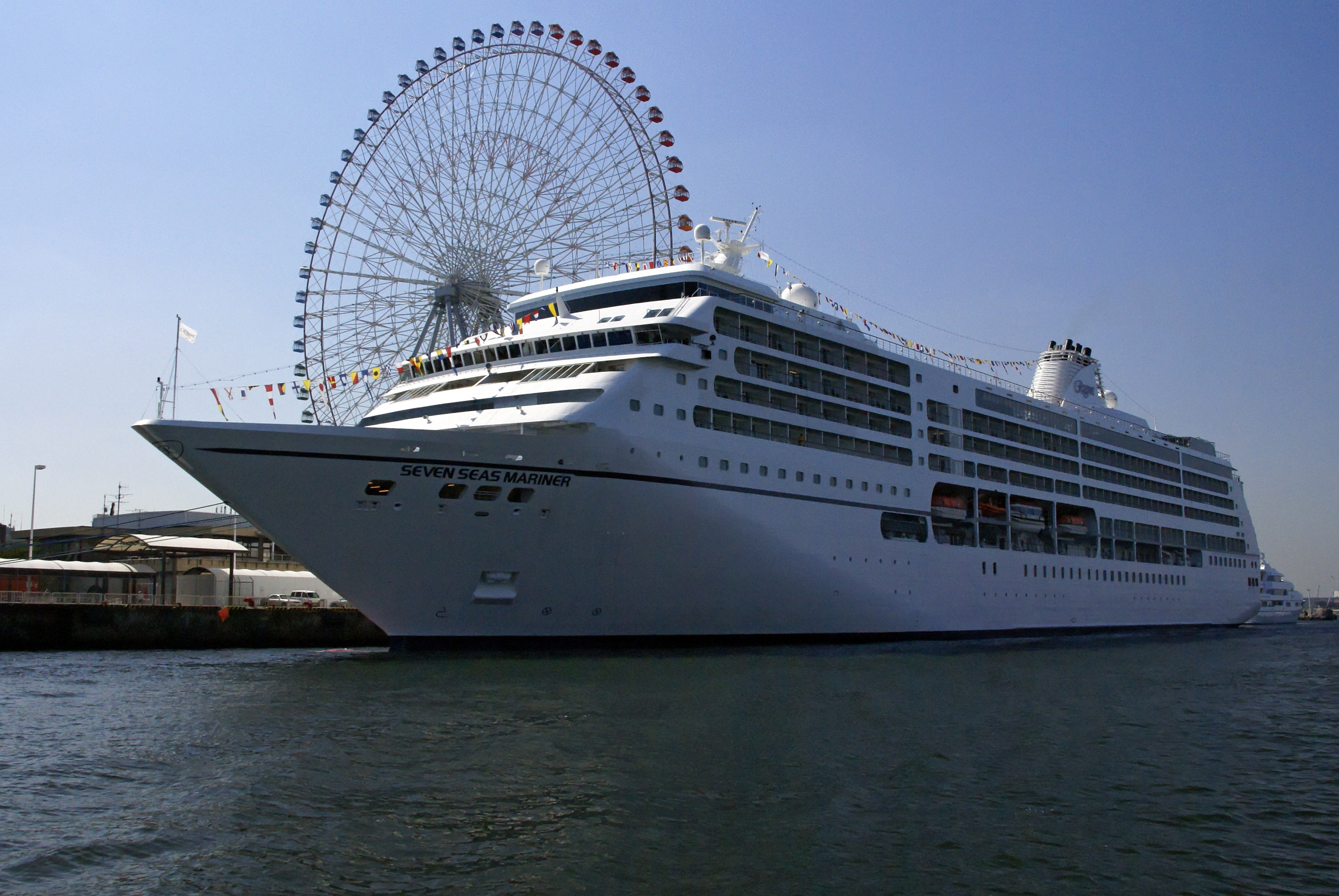
- Seven Seas Mariner at Port of Osaka

History
- Name: Seven Seas Mariner
- Owner: Mariner LLC
- Operator: Regent Seven Seas Cruises
- Port of registry: Nassau, Bahamas
- Builder: Chantiers de l'Atlantique; Saint-Nazaire, France
- Laid down: 17 January 2000
- Launched: 8 September 2000
- Completed: 8 March 2001
- In service: 2001
- Identification: Call sign: C6VV8; DNV ID: 29872; IMO number: 9210139; MMSI number: 311622000
- Status: In service

General characteristics
- Type: Mistral-class cruise ship
- Tonnage: 48,075 GT; 17,600 NT; 4,700 DWT
- Length: 216.1 m (709 ft)
- Beam: 28.3 m (93 ft)
- Draught: 21 ft (6.4 m)
- Decks: 8
- Installed power: 4 x 7920 kW Wärtsilä 12V38A gensets
- Speed: 20 knots (37 km/h; 23 mph)
- Capacity: 700 passengers
- Crew: 445

Seven Seas Mariner is a cruise ship operated by Regent Seven Seas Cruises (formerly Radisson Seven Seas Cruises). She was the first all-suite, all-balcony ship in the world, and was awarded "Ship of the Year" in 2002 by Ocean and Cruise News. Also, she was the first to offer dining by the famous Le Cordon Bleu of Paris in one of the onboard restaurants. Her staff to guest ratio is 1 to 1.6.

In 2009, Seven Seas Mariner made the news when it rescued an around-the-world-sailor from a crippled sailing yacht west of New Zealand.

In March 2022, the ship was almost hit by a tornado as it departed the port of New Orleans. No damage or casualties were reported.

In February, 2026 the ship was hit with a mass outbreak of gastrointestinal illness while sailing from Miami to Honolulu.
