= Regent Seven Seas Cruises =

Cruise line

- Company type: Subsidiary
- Industry: Tourism
- Founded: 1992
- Headquarters: Miami-Dade County, Florida, United States
- Area served: Worldwide
- Products: Cruises
- Parent: Norwegian Cruise Line Holdings
- Website: www.rssc.com

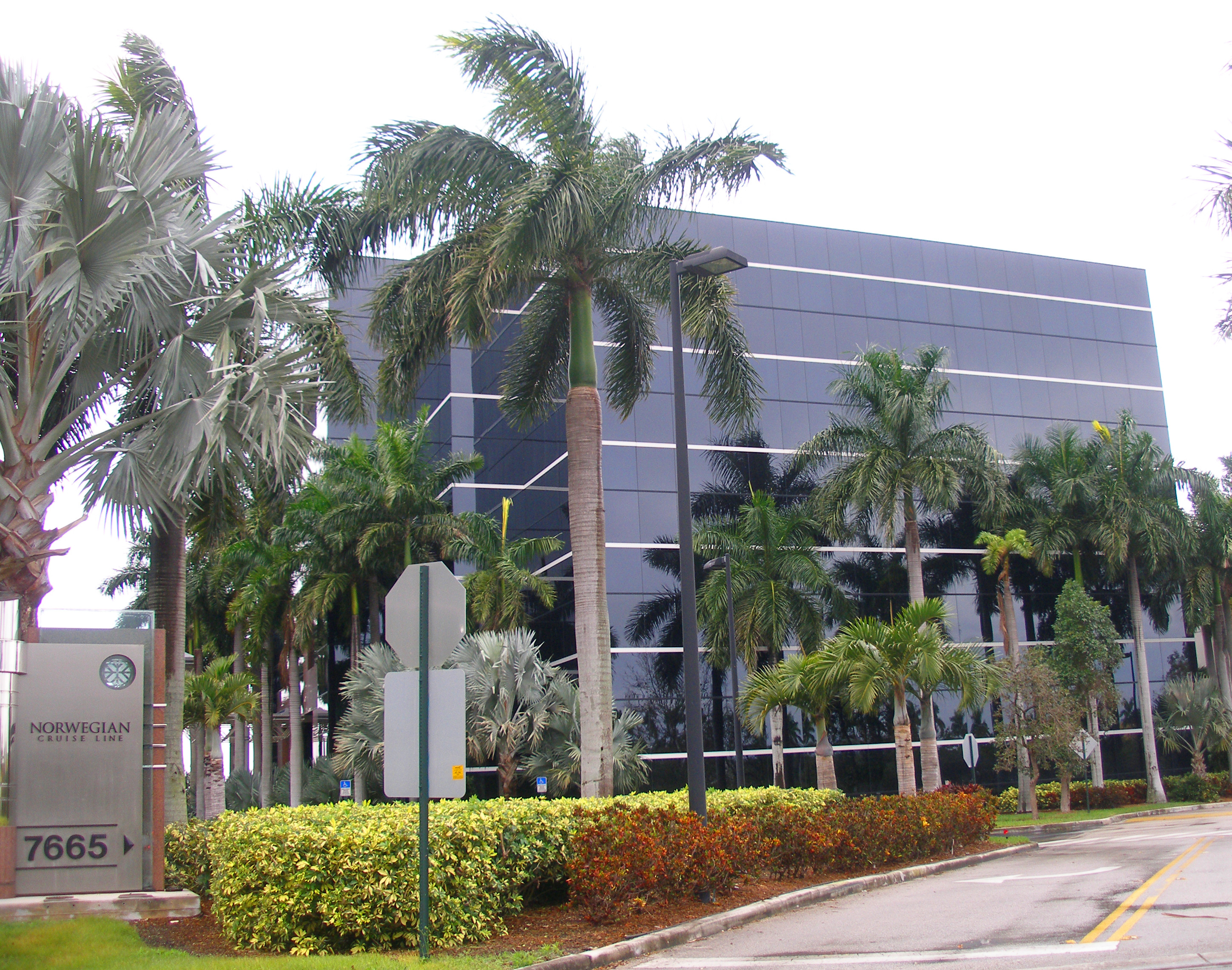
The Norwegian Cruise Line headquarters also houses this cruise line

Regent Seven Seas Cruises (RSSC), formerly known as Radisson Seven Seas Cruises, is a luxury cruise line headquartered in Miami-Dade County, Florida, United States.

Since September 2014, Regent Seven Seas Cruises has been a wholly owned subsidiary of Norwegian Cruise Line Holdings, which also owns Norwegian Cruise Line and Oceania Cruises.

== Ownership ==
Apollo Global Management, a New York-based private equity firm, purchased Regent Seven Seas Cruises from Carlson Companies for $1 billion in February 2008. Apollo also owned Oceania Cruises and 15.8% of Norwegian Cruise Line. Carlson retained ownership of the master Regent brand, along with the operations of Regent Hotels & Resorts around the world.

Following the purchase, Apollo made public their plans to order a new ship for Regent. The new ship was planned to be of similar dimensions and capacity as the Seven Seas Voyager and Seven Seas Mariner, but with larger accommodations and expanded public spaces. This was to be the Seven Seas Explorer.

On September 2, 2014 Norwegian Cruise Line Holdings purchased Prestige Cruise Holdings, the parent company of Oceania Cruises and Regent Seven Seas Cruises, for $3.025 billion.

== Fleet ==
=== Current fleet ===
Ship	Built	Builder	Pax	Gross tonnage	Flag	Image
Seven Seas Navigator	1999	T. Mariotti, Genoa, Italy	496	28,803 GT	Bahamas	
Seven Seas Voyager	2003	T. Mariotti, Genoa, Italy	698	42,363 GT	Bahamas	
Seven Seas Mariner	2001	Chantiers de l'Atlantique, Saint-Nazaire, France	700	48,075 GT	Bahamas	
Seven Seas Explorer	2016	Fincantieri, Sestri Ponente, Genova	746	55,254 GT	Marshall Islands	
Seven Seas Splendor	2020	Fincantieri, Ancona	746	56,182 GT	Marshall Islands	
Seven Seas Grandeur	2023	Fincantieri, Ancona	744	56,199 GT	Marshall Islands	

=== Future fleet ===
Ship	Due	Builder	Pax	Gross tonnage	Flag	Notes
Seven Seas Prestige	2026	Fincantieri, Marghera	822	77,000 GT	Marshall Islands	Largest vessel ever built for Regent. Construction started in October 2024. keel laid on March 27, 2025 Hull 6354 / TSL 76550
TBA	2029	Fincantieri	822	77,000 GT	Marshall Islands	Sister ship to largest vessel ever built for Regent.
TBA	2033	Fincantieri	822	77,000 GT	Marshall Islands	Sister ship to largest vessel ever built for Regent.
TBA	2036	Fincantieri	822	77,000 GT	Marshall Islands	Sister ship to largest vessel ever built for Regent.

=== Former fleet ===
Ship	Built	In service for Regent	Builder	Pax	Gross tonnage	Status	Image
Song of Flower	1973/1986	1990–2003	KMV, Kristiansand, Norway	200	8,282 GRT	Scrapped 2024	
Radisson Diamond	1992	1992–2005	Finnyards Rauma, Finland	354	20,295 GT	Wrecked in 2022	
Paul Gauguin	1997	1997–2010	Chantiers de l'Atlantique, France	332	19,200 GT	Sailing for Ponant Cruises	

== See also ==
- Oceania Cruises
- Seabourn Cruise Line
- Silversea Cruises
