= Seven Seas Voyager =

Cruise ship of Regent Seven Seas Cruises

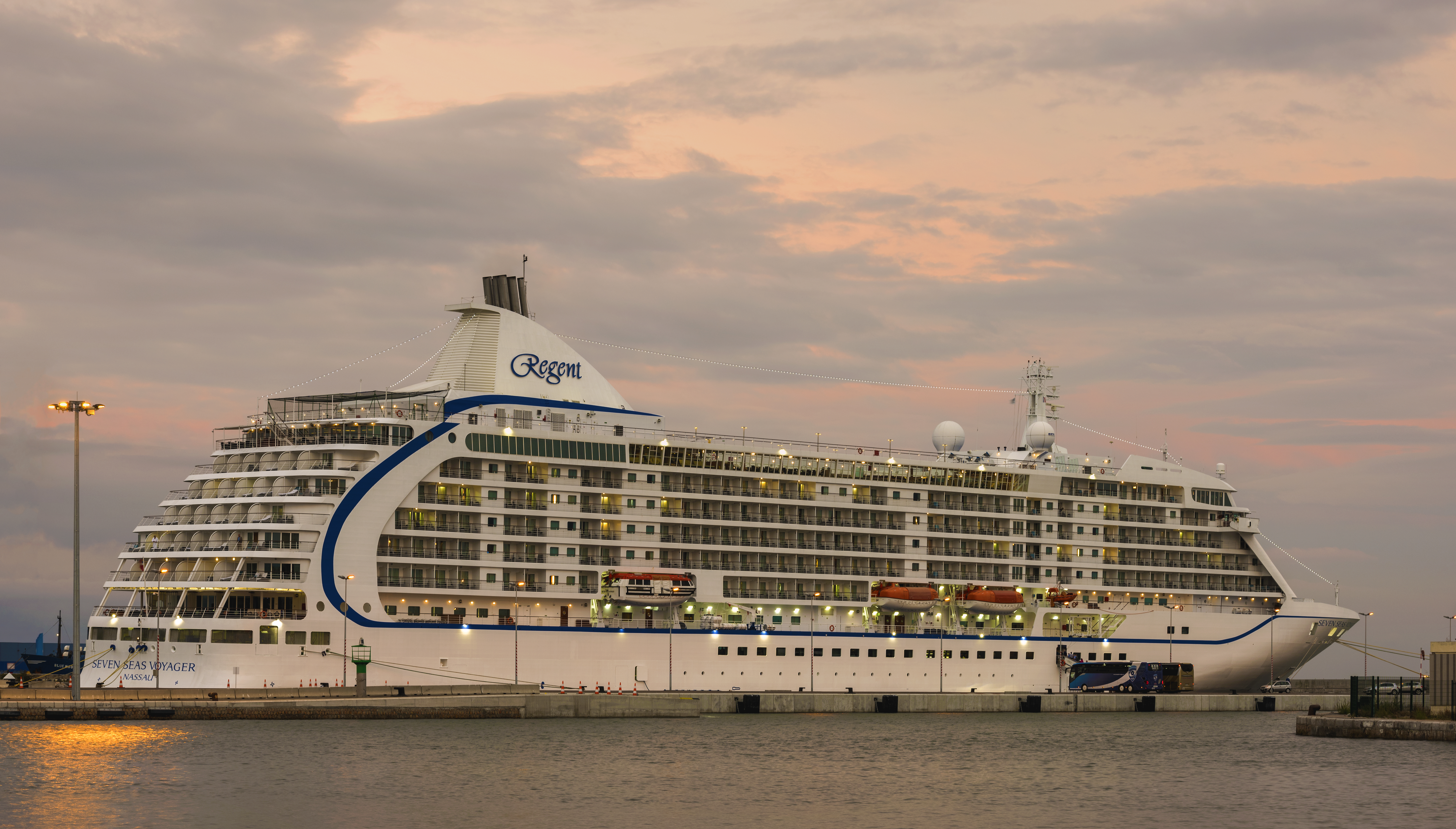
- Seven Seas Voyager in Sète, 2015

History
- Name: Seven Seas Voyager
- Owner: 2003–2009: Regent Seven Seas Cruises; 2009–2013: Supplystill; 2013–Present : Voyager Vessel Company
- Operator: Regent Seven Seas Cruises
- Port of registry: Nassau, Bahamas
- Builder: T. Mariotti, Genoa, Italy
- Yard number: 736
- Laid down: 30 March 2001
- Launched: 22 September 2001
- Completed: 27 February 2003
- Identification: Call sign: C6SW3; IMO number: 9247144; MMSI number: 311513000
- Status: In service

General characteristics
- Type: Cruise ship
- Tonnage: 42,363 GT
- Length: 206.5 m (677.49 ft)
- Beam: 28.83 m (94.59 ft)
- Height: 184 ft (56.1 m)
- Draft: 7.05 m (23.13 ft)
- Decks: 12
- Installed power: 4 × Wärtsilä 9L38 (4 × 5760 kW)
- Propulsion: Diesel-electric; Two Dolphin DPP395 azimuth thrusters (2 × 7 MW)
- Speed: 20 knots (37 km/h; 23 mph)
- Capacity: 706 passengers
- Crew: 447

Seven Seas Voyager is a cruise ship operated by Regent Seven Seas Cruises. She entered service in 2003. Every cabin on board is a suite with a balcony. In 2006, a Forbes article listed the Asia leg of the Voyager's world cruise as the most expensive cruise in the Asia region.

== Incidents ==
=== 2010 accident ===
On 14 March 2010, as Seven Seas Voyager sailed out of Victoria Harbour, Hong Kong, it collided with the stern of a Star Ferry, Twinkling Star, and caused minor damage to the ferry. No one was injured.

=== 2013 incident ===
On 3 February 2013, Jackie Kastrinelis, of Groveland, Massachusetts, was found dead inside her cabin on the Seven Seas Voyager in Darwin Harbour, Australia. The 24-year-old woman had been a crew member since 2011 and was the lead singer in the ship's musical show. Circumstances surrounding Jackie's death included a head injury the night before during a rehearsal, medication given by a doctor on the ship, and romantic relationships with a few crew members. The official reasoning behind the death of Jackie Kastrinelis was "sudden unexplained death syndrome".

=== 2018 collision ===
On the evening of September 25, 2018 the Seven Seas Voyager was sailing from the Italian port of Civitavecchia when strong winds caused the vessel to strike a pier. The vessel came to a halt shortly thereafter and remained tied up in the port overnight to assess damage. The damage was determined to be largely cosmetic and the vessel continued its itinerary although the incident caused it to miss the scheduled stop at Sorrento, Italy. Temporary cosmetic repairs were completed in Koper, Slovenia, before the cruise came to its scheduled conclusion in Venice, Italy.
