= MS Riviera =

Cruise ship

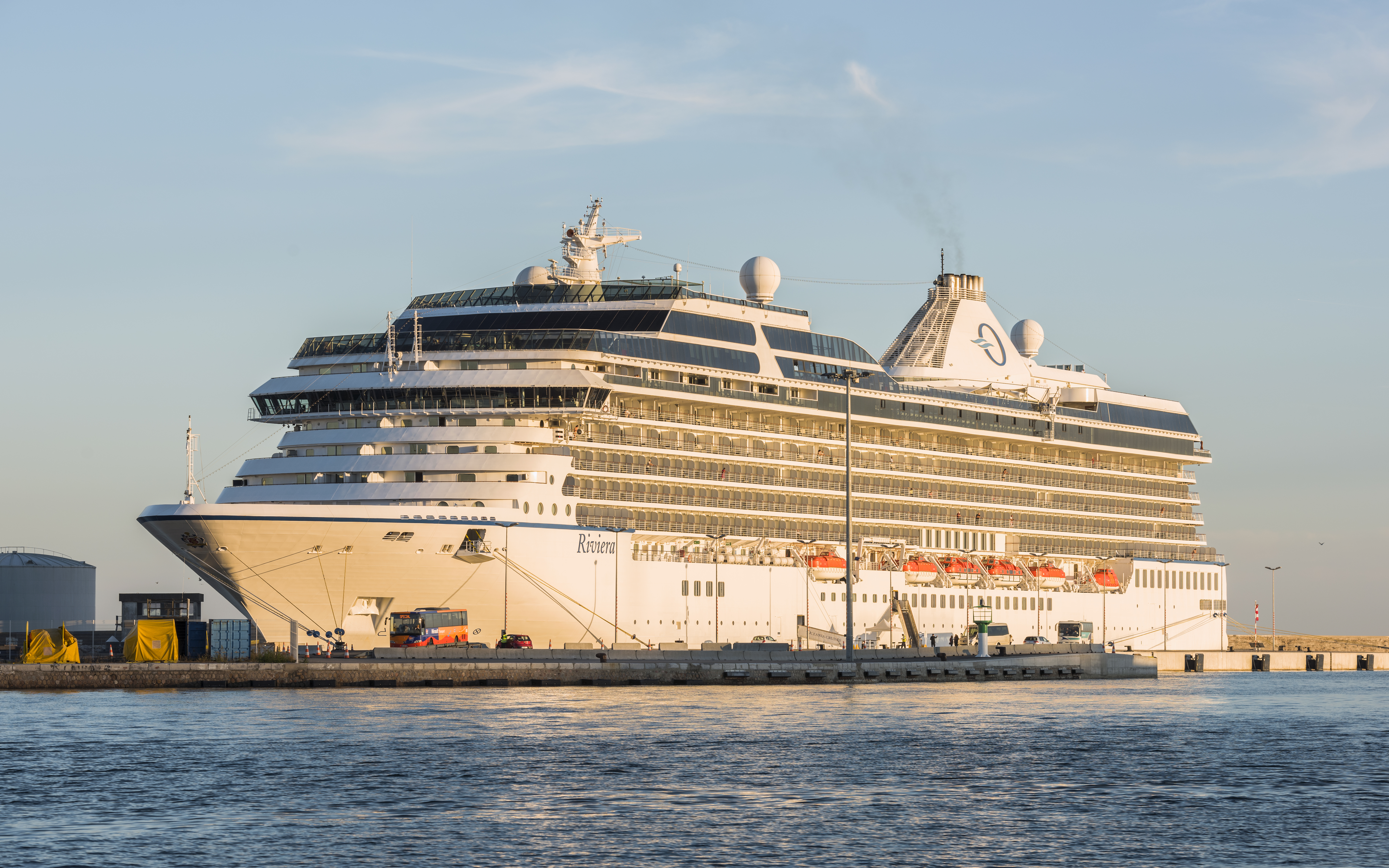
- MS Riviera at Sète, France, October 2016

History
- Name: Riviera
- Owner: Oceania Cruises
- Operator: Oceania Cruises
- Port of registry: Marshall Islands
- Ordered: 2007
- Builder: Fincantieri Sestri Ponente
- Yard number: 6195
- Launched: 16 July 2011
- Christened: May 2012
- Maiden voyage: May 2012
- Identification: IMO number: 9438078; MMSI number: 538004353
- Status: In Active Status as of 2012

General characteristics
- Class & type: Oceania-class cruise ship
- Tonnage: 66,172 GT
- Length: 785 ft (239.27 m)
- Beam: 106 ft (32.31 m)
- Height: 157.5 ft (48.01 m)
- Draught: 24 ft (7.32 m)
- Decks: 15 (11 guest decks)
- Installed power: 2 x 12,600 kW Wartsila 12V46C 2x 8,400 kW Wartsila 8L46C
- Propulsion: 2 x 12 MW electric motors affixed to fixed pitch propellers 2 x 2,200 kW bow thrusters 1 x 1,900 kW stern thruster
- Speed: 20-knot (37 km/h)
- Capacity: 1,250 passengers (double occupancy)
- Crew: 800 crew

MS Riviera is an Oceania-class cruise ship (of 15 decks) which entered service with Oceania Cruises in May 2012. She is the sister ship of MS Marina.

Riviera was built by Fincantieri in Sestri Ponente, Italy, and was launched in July 2011. The vessel was originally scheduled to be christened in Monte Carlo on 19 April 2012, but in January 2012 it was announced that the ship's maiden voyage would be delayed to May due to shipyard labor strikes. Riviera was christened in Barcelona on 11 May 2012, and embarked on her 10-day maiden voyage from Venice to Athens on 16 May 2012.

In September 2024, Oceania announced that Riviera would be sailing Alaska in 2025, marking the first time the ship sails those waters.

Riviera has tonnage of 66,084 gross tons, with a capacity of 1,250 passengers housed in 625 staterooms.

== Coronavirus pandemic ==
During the coronavirus pandemic, the CDC reported, as early as 22 April 2020, that at least one person who tested positive for SARS-CoV-2 was symptomatic while on board.
