= Oceania Cruises =

Cruise company

- Type: Subsidiary
- Industry: Tourism
- Founded: 2002
- Founder: Frank Del Rio; Bob Binder; Joe Watters
- Headquarters: Miami-Dade County, Florida, United States
- Area served: Worldwide
- Key people: John W. Chidsey (president and CEO)
- Products: Cruises
- Parent: Norwegian Cruise Line Holdings
- Website: oceaniacruises.com

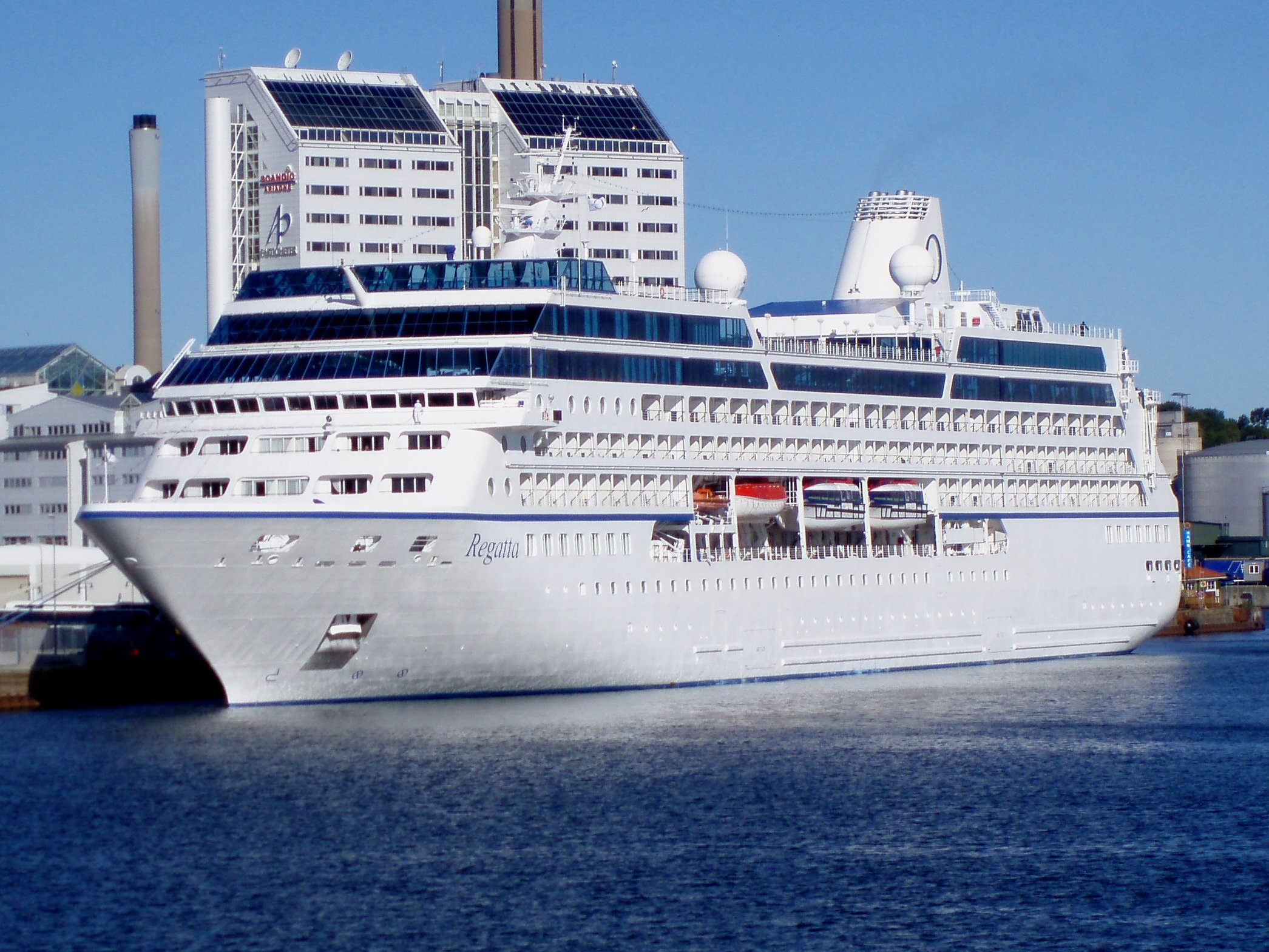
Regatta in Stockholm, summer 2007

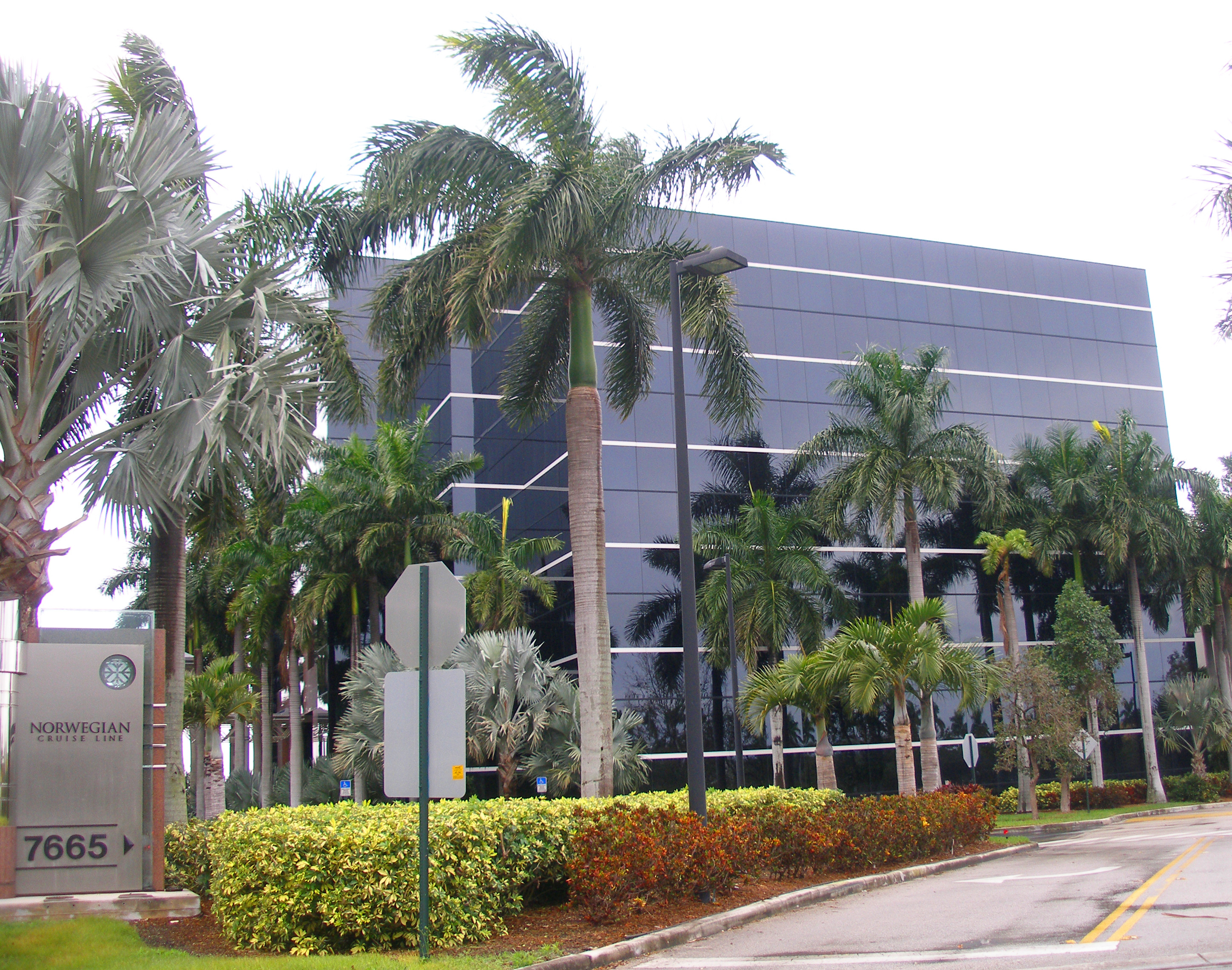
The Norwegian Cruise Line headquarters also houses this cruise line

Oceania Cruises is a cruise line based in Miami-Dade County, Florida, that operates eight cruise ships on worldwide itineraries. It typically offers cruises that last between 10 and 14 days, but it is also known for its long cruises lasting up to 195 days. The line's president was Frank A. Del Rio Jr. who is the son of the co-founder of the brand, Frank A. Del Rio Sr., until February 18, 2025, when Jason Montague took over the brand's day to day oversight.

Since September 2014, Oceania Cruises has been a wholly owned subsidiary of Norwegian Cruise Line Holdings, which also owns Norwegian Cruise Line and Regent Seven Seas Cruises.

== History ==
Oceania Cruises was founded in 2002. The company chartered the former Renaissance Cruises ship R Two from Cruiseinvest and renamed her Insignia in October 2002. In April 2003 the Insignia was chartered to the French travel agency TRM for three months, during which Oceania Cruises operated no vessels. On 15 June 2003 Oceania Cruises re-commenced service with two ships: Insignia was renamed Regatta and a new ship (R One, a sister ship of Insignia/Regatta, also chartered from Cruiseinvest) entered service as the new Insignia.

In November 2005, a third R-class ship entered service for Oceania Cruises when the company chartered the R Five from Cruiseinvest and renamed her Nautica. At the naming ceremony of the Nautica, Frank del Rio announced the plan of adding a fourth ship, Marina, to the Oceania Cruises fleet in July 2007, but this never came to pass.

In February 2007, the majority of Oceania Cruises' stock was sold to the New York-based private equity firm Apollo Global Management. The following month, Oceania made a memorandum agreement with the Fincantieri shipyard in Italy to construct two new 1,250-passenger ships. The contract was finalized in June 2007, with delivery dates for the new Oceania-class ships set for January 2011 and July 2011. The contract also included an option for a third vessel of the same type that could be delivered in May 2012, but Oceania declined the option.

After being leased out for two years to Hapag-Lloyd as the Columbus 2, the Insignia returned to the fleet in 2014.

In May 2014, it was announced that Oceania and Fincantieri were close to making a deal on two additional ships for the Oceania class. The order for these additional ships never came to fruition.

On September 2, 2014, Norwegian Cruise Line Holdings purchased Prestige Cruise Holdings, the parent company of Oceania Cruises and Regent Seven Seas Cruises, for $3.025 billion.

On November 25, 2014, Norwegian Cruise Line Holdings Ltd announced a definitive agreement with Princess Cruises to purchase the Ocean Princess for Oceania Cruises. Upon delivery in March 2016, the ship underwent a 35-day, $40 million refurbishment in Marseille, France, to become the Sirena.

In August 2018, Oceania Cruises announced its intention to renovate each of its four ships as a part of the $100 million "OceaniaNEXT" program.

On January 8, 2019, Oceania Cruises announced it ordered a new class of ships, the Allura class. The order will consist of two new ships to be built by Fincantieri at a cost of more than $650 million per ship. The ships will be 67,000 gross tons and have a 1,200-passenger capacity. They are scheduled to be delivered in 2022 and 2025.

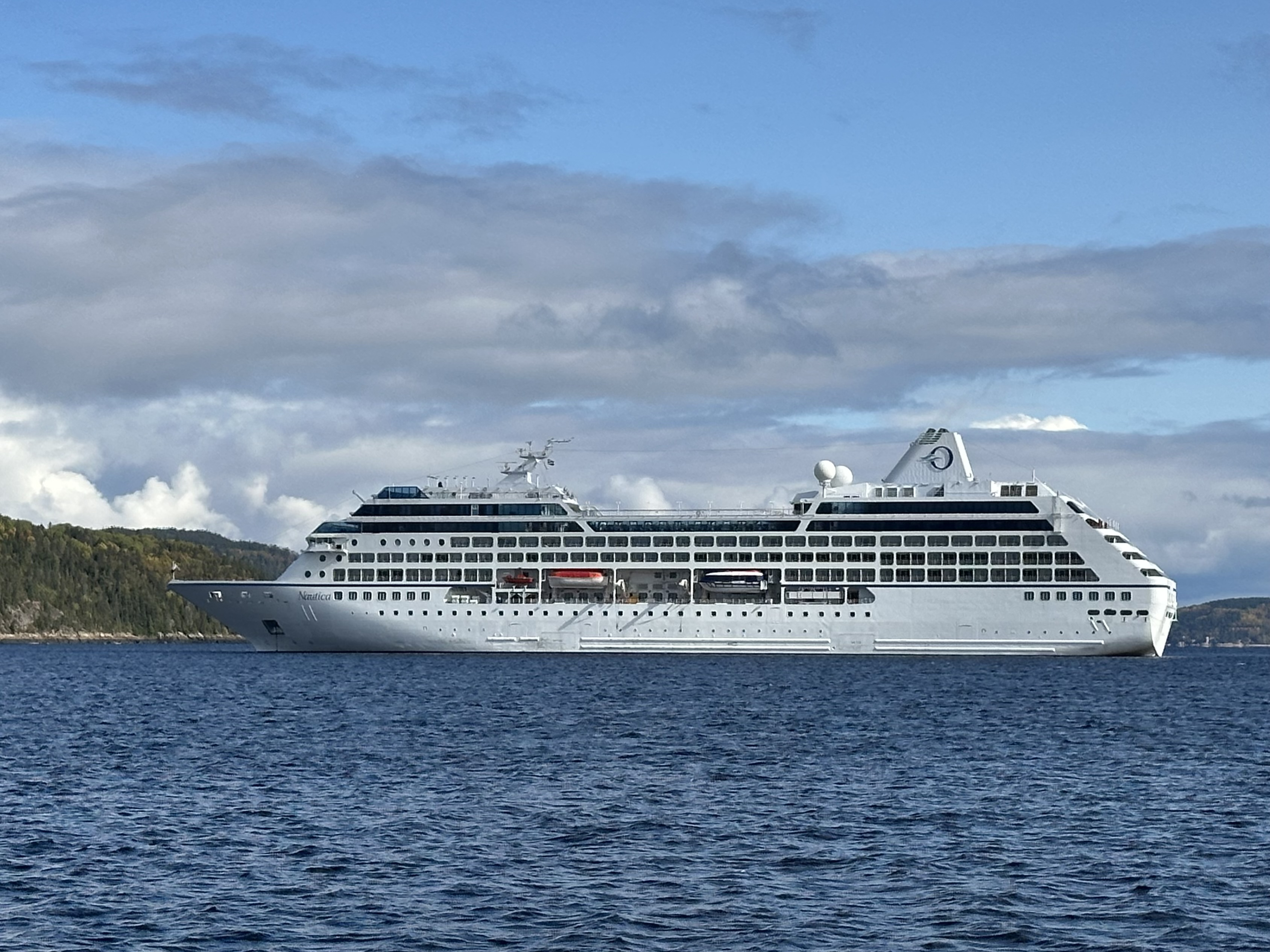
The Nautica anchored off Saguenay, Quebec, Canada October 8, 2024

== Services ==
Oceania Cruises markets itself as having "The Finest Cuisine at Sea" and has gone so far as to trademark that phrase. In 2003, the cruise line appointed celebrity chef Jacques Pépin as its Executive Culinary Director; he "is credited with helping it achieve its reputation for culinary excellence and style".

The validity of the phrase and the reputation have been considered by reviewers. Brian Johnston, writing for Stuff.co.nz about a cruise on Marina in 2018, asked, "So, does [the ship] offer the finest cuisine at sea?" and answered, "Yes, if you choose your dining venues and dishes well." In 2019, in The CEO Magazine, Skye Hoklas was even more cautious: "We enjoyed the culinary experience ..." The following year, Isabella Sullivan wrote for World of Cruising that the phrase was "... a bold statement to make, but one that Oceania Cruises can confidently lay claim to." In 2023, in a review of a cruise aboard Vista, Sue Bryant opined in The Times:

It's certainly an audacious claim, but I'm embarrassingly picky about food and this week I've given into temptation at every turn. I'd say Vista is right up there. Just go on a diet before you sail. Or consider elasticated waistbands.

== Fleet ==
=== Regatta class ===
The Regatta-class ships were built in 1998–2000 for Renaissance Cruises as a part of their R class. They have a gross tonnage of 30,277 and can accommodate a maximum of 824 passengers in 343 cabins.

Ship	Built	Builder	Entered service for Oceania	Gross Tonnage	Flag	Notes	Image
Nautica	2000	Chantiers de l'Atlantique	2005	30,277 tons	Marshall Islands	Previously R Five, Refurbished in 2021. Scheduled to undergo major renovation in 2027 and be renamed Aurelia.	
Insignia	1998	Chantiers de l'Atlantique	2004/2014	30,277 tons	Marshall Islands	Previously R One and Columbus 2, Reentered the fleet in May 2014. Leaving the Oceania fleet in 2027.	
Sirena	1999	Chantiers de l'Atlantique	2016	30,277 tons	Marshall Islands	Previously R Four, Tahitian Princess, and Ocean Princess. Leaving the Oceania fleet in the Spring of 2028.	

=== Oceania class ===
The Oceania class consists of two 1,250-passenger, 66,084-gross ton ships built by Fincantieri in Italy, with the first, MS Marina, delivered in January 2011, and the second, MS Riviera, delivered in May 2012. These were the first ships built for Oceania. On these vessels 580 of the 625 cabins and suites have private balconies.

Ship	Built	Builder	Entered service for Oceania	Gross Tonnage	Flag	Notes	Image
Marina	2011	Fincantieri	2011	66,084 tons	Marshall Islands	First new build for Oceania.	
Riviera	2012	Fincantieri	2012	66,172 tons	Marshall Islands	Marina's sister ship.	

=== Allura class ===
In January 2019, two 1,200-passenger, 67,000-gross ton ships were ordered from Fincantieri, with the first to be delivered in 2023 and the second to be delivered in 2025.

Ship	Built	Builder	Entered service for Oceania	Gross Tonnage	Flag	Notes	Image
Vista	2023	Fincantieri	April 2023	67,817 tons	Marshall Islands	Third new build for Oceania.	
Allura	2025	Fincantieri	10 July 2025	67,817 tons	Marshall Islands	Fourth new build for Oceania.	

=== Sonata class ===
In April 2024, two 1,450-passenger, 86,000-gross ton ships were ordered from Fincantieri, with the first to be delivered in 2027 and the second to be delivered in 2029. In July 2025 Oceania Cruises has confirmed it will double its newbuild order with Fincantieri as two more 1,450-guest ships will debut for the brand in 2032 and 2035, respectively. In February 2026 Oceania confirmed a fifth Sonata Class ship has been ordered, due to enter service in 2037.

These vessels were called "an evolution of the Allura class series" by the shipyard.

Ship	Built	Builder	Will Enter Service for Oceania	Gross Tonnage	Flag	Notes	Image
Sonata	2027	Fincantieri	2027	86,000 tons	Marshall Islands	Largest vessel ever built for Oceania. Hull No. 6359	
Arietta	2029	Fincantieri	2029	86,000 tons	Marshall Islands	Sister ship to largest vessel ever built for Oceania.	
ΤΒΑ	2032	Fincantieri	2032	86,000 tons	Marshall Islands	Sister ship to largest vessel ever built for Oceania.	
ΤΒΑ	2035	Fincantieri	2035	86,000 tons	Marshall Islands	Sister ship to largest vessel ever built for Oceania.	
ΤΒΑ	2037	Fincantieri	2037	86,000 tons	Marshall Islands	Sister ship to largest vessel ever built for Oceania.	

=== Former Fleet ===
Ship	Built	Builder	Service Period for Oceania	Gross Tonnage	Flag	Notes	Image
Regatta	1998	Chantiers de l'Atlantique	2003-2026	30,277 tons	Marshall Islands	Previously R Two and Insignia, Left the Oceania fleet in 2026 and currently sailing for Explorations by Norwegian.	

== See also ==
- Regent Seven Seas Cruises
- Seabourn Cruise Line
- Silversea Cruises
