= MS Sirena =

Cruise ship (built 1999)

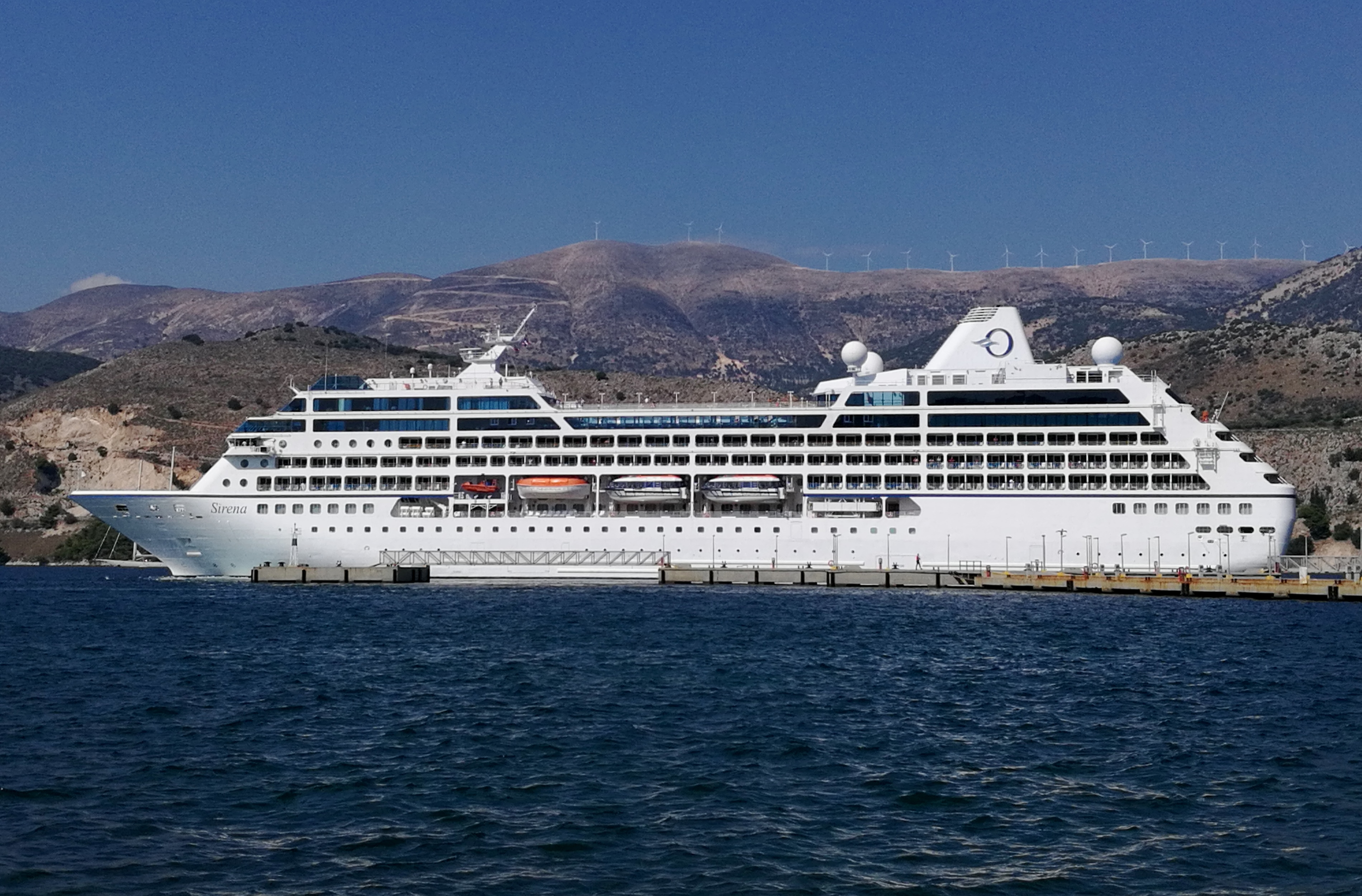
- Sirena at the port of Argostoli, Kefalonia in 2018.

History
- Name: 1999–2002: R Four; 2002–2009: Tahitian Princess; 2009-2016: Ocean Princess; 2016-present: Sirena
- Owner: 1999–2001: Renaissance Cruises; 2002–2016: Princess Cruises; 2016-present: Oceania Cruises
- Operator: 1999–2001: Renaissance Cruises; 2001–2002: laid up; 2002–2016: Princess Cruises; 2016-present: Oceania Cruises
- Port of registry: Liberia, Monrovia 1999–2002; Gibraltar 2002–2005; Bermuda, Hamilton 2005–2016; Marshall Islands 2016–present
- Builder: Chantiers de l'Atlantique; St. Nazaire, France
- Cost: GB£150 million
- Yard number: O31
- Christened: December 1999
- Acquired: 1999
- Identification: Call sign: ZCDS4; IMO number: 9187899; MMSI no.: 310505000
- Status: In service

General characteristics (as Ocean Princess)
- Class & type: R-class cruise ship (as built); Regatta-class cruise ship (currently)
- Tonnage: 30,277 GT; 2,700 DWT
- Length: 181.00 m (593 ft 10 in)
- Beam: 25.46 m (83 ft 6 in)
- Draught: 5.80 m (19 ft 0 in)
- Decks: 11 (9 passenger accessible)
- Installed power: 4 × Wärtsilä 12V32; 13,500 kW (combined)
- Propulsion: Twin propellers
- Speed: 18 knots (33 km/h; 21 mph)
- Capacity: 688 (lower berths); 826 (all berths)
- Crew: 373

Sirena, formerly R Four, Tahitian Princess, and Ocean Princess, is an R-class cruise ship formerly owned by Princess Cruises. When part of the Princess fleet, along with the Pacific Princess, Ocean Princess was one of the two smallest in the fleet. In March 2016, she was sold to Oceania Cruises and renamed Sirena.

== History ==
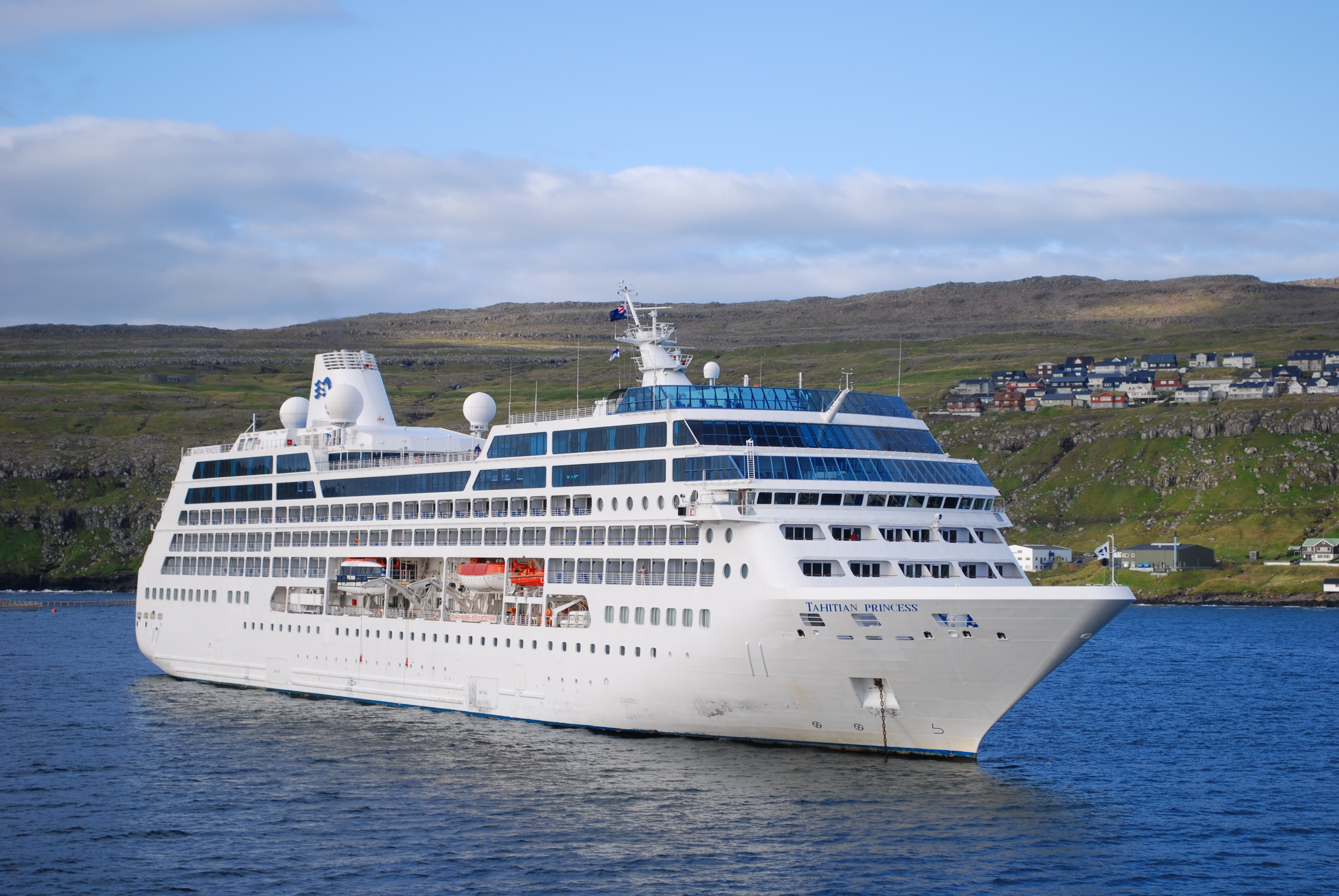
Tahitian Princess anchored in Tórshavn, Faroe Islands, 17 August 2009

The vessel entered operation in 1999 under the flag of Renaissance Cruises. The ship was not owned by the company; instead she was owned by a group of French investors. When Renaissance declared bankruptcy in 2001, the ship was seized by creditors, along with the other seven vessels in the fleet.

In 2002, Princess Cruises secured a two-year lease for R Four and her sister ship R Three (now Pacific Princess). The vessel entered operation at the end of 2002, and was renamed Tahitian Princess. At the end of the lease, Princess Cruises purchased both vessels.

In November 2009 the Tahitian Princess was renamed Ocean Princess to "reflect a more global theme."

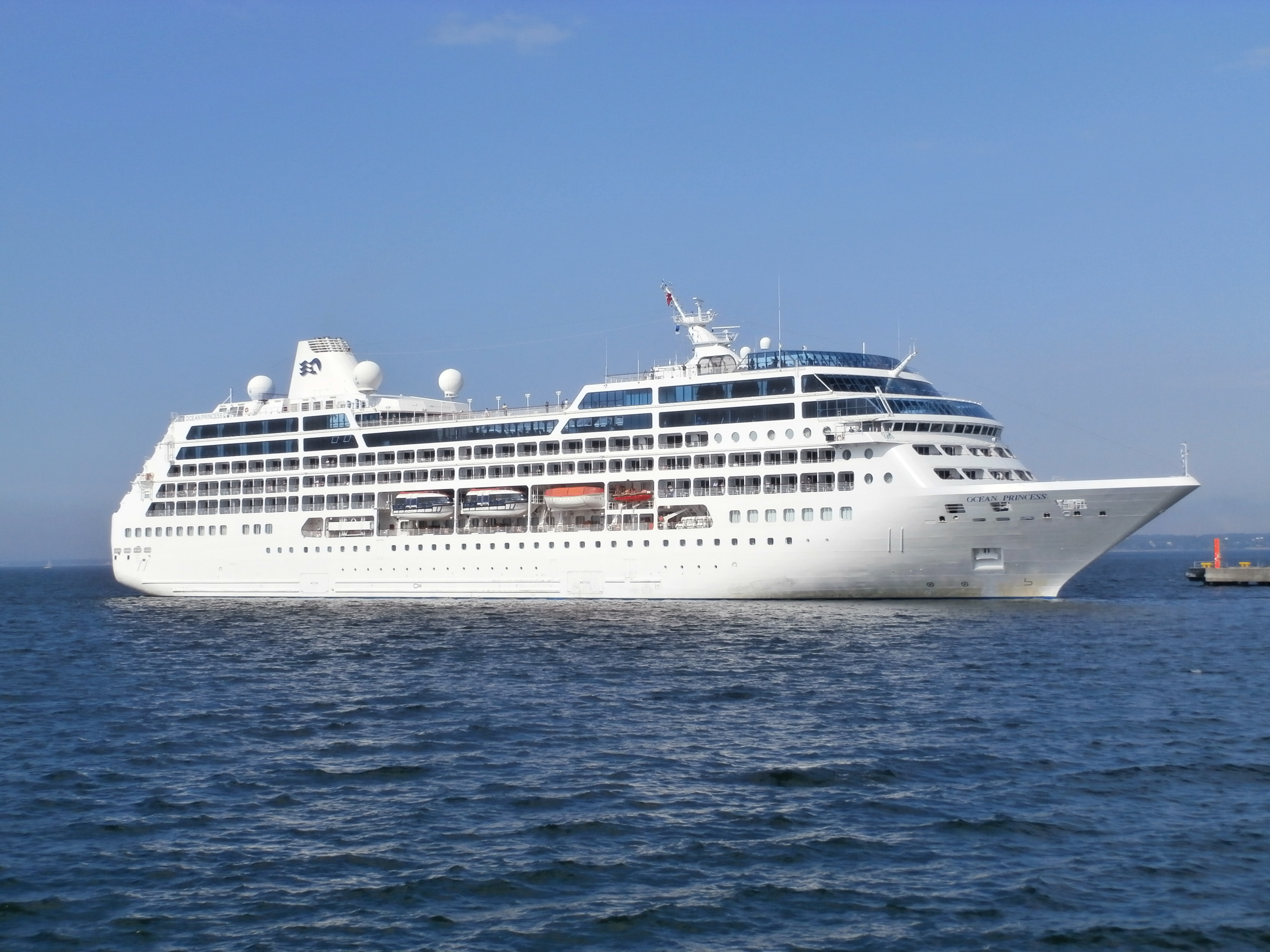
Ocean Princess departing Tallinn, Estonia, 23 June 2013

It was announced on 25 November 2014, that the ship was to be sold to Oceania Cruises for $82 million under a finance agreement. She departed the Princess fleet in March 2016 and underwent a 35-day, $40 million refurbishment in Marseille, France, to become Sirena. On 27 April 2016, The Sirena was christened and entered service for Oceania.

In September 2026, the ship was bought by Ambassador Cruise Line, with plans to rename it in spring 2028 to Ambella and configure it specifically for the German-speaking market, with the study-abroad program Semester at Sea using it during the winter months.
