= SS Eugenio C =

Ocean Liner/Cruise Ship Owned By Costa Cruises

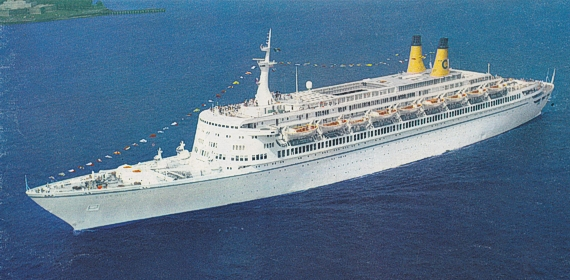
- Eugenio C

History
- Name: 1966–1987: Eugenio C; 1987–1999: Eugenio Costa; 1999–2000: Edinburgh Castle; 2000–2004: The Big Red Boat II; 2004–2005: Red Boat
- Owner: 1966–1996: Costa Cruises; 1996–1998: Bremer Vulkan shipyard; 1998–1999: Lowline Shipping; 1999–2003: Cammell Laird; 2003–2005: Argo Ship Management
- Operator: 1966–1996: Costa Cruises; 1998–1999: Direct Cruises; 1999–2000: Premier Cruise Line; 2000–2005: laid up
- Builder: Cantieri Riuniti dell'Adriatico
- Launched: 21 November 1964
- Christened: by Pinuccia Costa Musso
- In service: 31 August 1966
- Out of service: May 2005
- Identification: IMO number: 6502024
- Fate: Scrapped at Alang, India June 2005

General characteristics
- Tonnage: 32,753 GRT
- Length: 217.3 m (712 ft 11 in)
- Beam: 29.3 m (96 ft 2 in)
- Draught: 8.6 m (28 ft 3 in)
- Speed: 27 knots (50 km/h; 31 mph)
- Capacity: 1,636 passengers
- Crew: 424 (maximum)

Eugenio C was a 1966 Italian-built ocean liner/cruise ship originally owned by Costa Cruises. She was scrapped as Red Boat at Alang, India in June 2005.

== History ==
Eugenio C was ordered for the South American service by Costa (Linea C), to replace Frederico C on that route. Her keel was laid on 4 January 1964 at the Cantieri Riunite dell'Adriatico shipyard in Monfalcone, with Eugenio C being delivered to Costa on 22 August 1966, the same day she set out on her maiden trans-Atlantic voyage. For ten years she only operated trans-Atlantic voyages between Genoa and South America, until passenger loading dropped rapidly in the 1970s, when Eugenio C began cruising. After 1983 she would cross the Atlantic Ocean twice a year on a repositioning voyage. In 1984 she was extensively renovated and renamed Eugenio Costa. It was planned the vessel would be renamed American Adventure and transferred to American Family Cruises, which was to be a branch of Costa, but this plan was never realized. Eugenio Costa completed her last cruise for her original owners in November 1996.

Costa sold Eugenio Costa to the Bremer Vulcan shipyards in part exchange for the construction of Costa Victoria. Lowline Shipping would go on to acquire her and charter her to Direct Cruises, a British cruise line which offered budget cruises marketed via telemarketing. $12 million USD was spent on refitting Eugenio Costa into Edinburgh Castle. The vessel's mechanical problems brought about great difficulty to Direct and Lowline, until Direct filed for liquidation and Lowline Shipping filed for bankruptcy in 1999. Ownership of Edinburgh Castle was passed on to Lowline's main creditor, shipbuilder Cammell Laird.

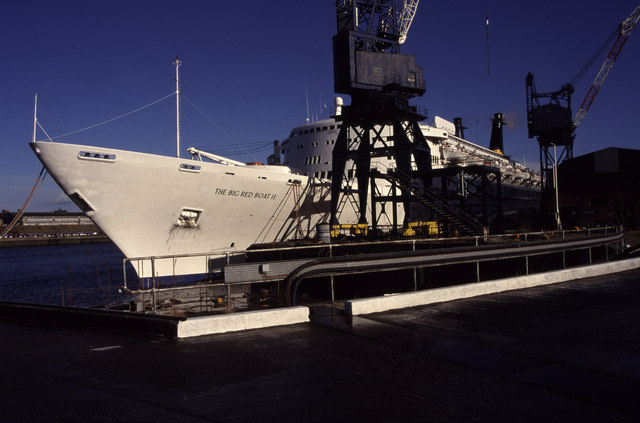
Eugenio C as The Big Red Boat II but still bearing her Edinburgh Castle colors

Cammell Laird chartered the vessel to Premier Cruises, renaming her The Big Red Boat II and having her go under a ten-month, $25 million USD overhaul. In June 2000, Big Red Boat II damaged a submerged power line in Narragansett Bay with its anchor while leaving Newport, Rhode Island, and severed the power connection to the nearby island town of Jamestown. The incident resulted in 6,000 Newport and Jamestown residents losing power for up to 17 hours.

Premier went into liquidation in September 2000, as a result Cammell Laird briefly chartered her to the United States Government, after which time she was laid up at Freeport, Bahamas alongside fellow ex-Premier fleet mates Rembrandt and Big Red Boat III.

The Big Red Boat II was sold to Argo Ship Management, who kept her up on the market. By 2005 it was obvious cruise companies were not willing to take their chances with her due to her history of mechanical problems. The vessel was renamed Red Boat, stopping in the Azores to refuel before being broken up for scrap at Alang scrapyards.
