= SS Oceanic (1963) =

Italian cruise ship built 1963-65

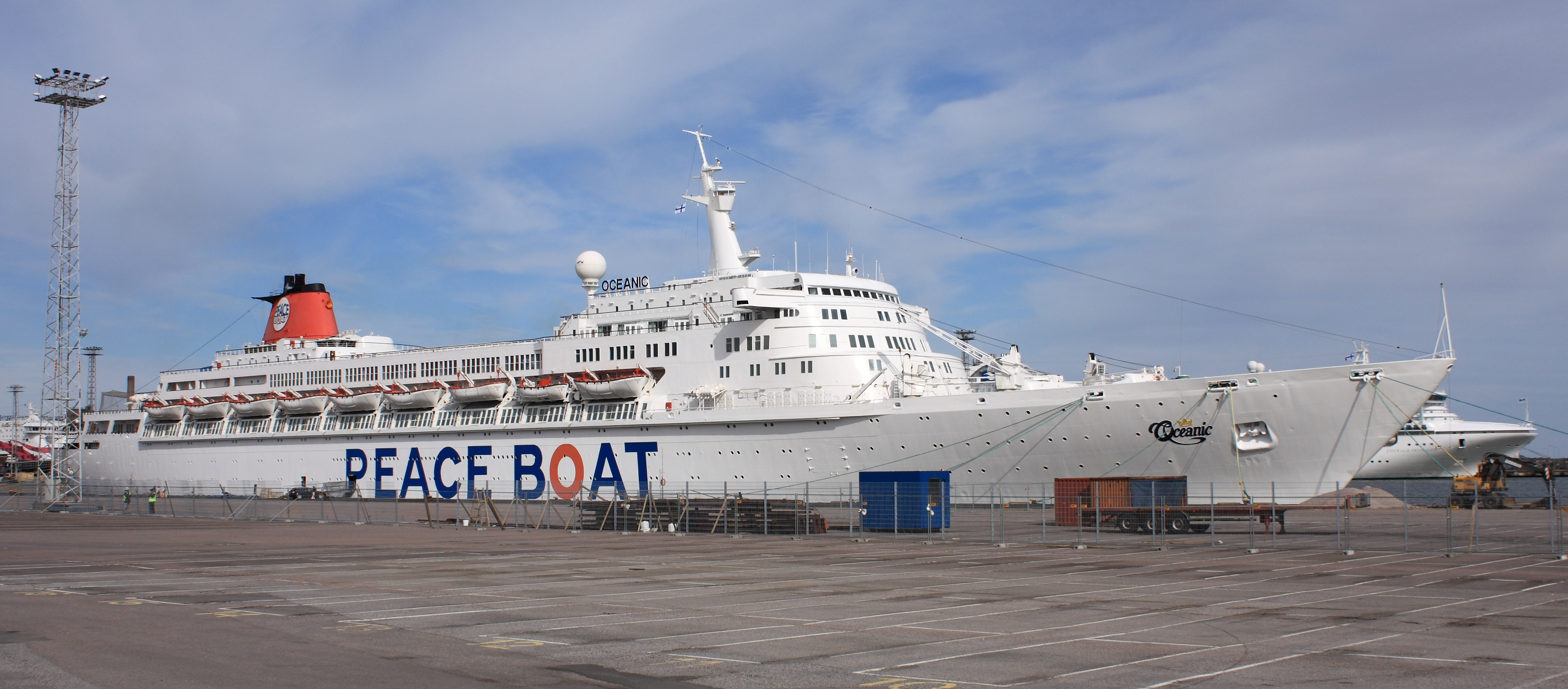
- Oceanic in Helsinki, June 2009

History
- Name: 1965–1985: Oceanic; 1985–2000: StarShip Oceanic; 2000: Big Red Boat I; 2001–2009: Oceanic; 2009–2012: The Oceanic
- Owner: 1965–1985: Home Lines; 1985–1996: Premier Cruise Line; 1996–2000: Premier Cruises; 2001–2009: Pullmantur Cruises; 2009–2012: Peace Boat
- Operator: 1965–1986: Home Lines; 1986–2000: Premier Cruise Line / Premier Cruises; 2001–2009: Pullmantur Cruises; 2009–2012: Peace Boat
- Port of registry: 1965–1990: Panama City, Panama; 1990–2000: Nassau, Bahamas; 2000–200?: Unknown, Spain; 2006–2009: Valletta, Malta; 2009–2012: Panama City, Panama; 2012: Tuvalu
- Builder: Cantieri Riuniti dell'Adriatico, Monfalcone, Italy
- Cost: $40 million
- Yard number: 1876
- Launched: 15 January 1963
- Completed: 1965
- Acquired: March 1965
- Maiden voyage: 31 March 1965
- In service: 31 March 1965
- Out of service: 2012
- Identification: IMO number: 5260679
- Fate: Scrapped at Zhoushan, China in 2012
- Notes: Sold for scrap in June 2012

General characteristics (as built, 1965)
- Type: cruise ship
- Tonnage: 39,241 GRT (British measurement); 19,141 NRT; 29,000 GRT (Panamian measurement); 8,738 t DWT
- Length: 238.44 m (782 ft 3 in)
- Beam: 29.42 m (96 ft 6 in)
- Draught: 8.60 m (28 ft 3 in)
- Installed power: 4 × DeLaval steam turbines; combined 44500 kW
- Propulsion: Two propellers
- Speed: 26.5 knots (49.1 km/h; 30.5 mph) service speed; 27.25 knots (50.47 km/h; 31.36 mph) maximum speed
- Capacity: 1,600 passengers (maximum)
- Crew: 560

General characteristics (as rebuilt, 2000)
- Tonnage: 38,772 GT
- Decks: 10 (passenger accessible)
- Speed: 18 knots (33 km/h; 21 mph) service speed
- Capacity: 1,800 passengers (maximum)
- Crew: 565
- Notes: Otherwise the same as built

SS Oceanic was a cruise ship built in 1963 by Cantieri Riuniti dell' Adriatico, Monfalcone, Italy for Home Lines. Between 1985 and 2000, she sailed for Premier Cruise Line under the names Starship Oceanic and Big Red Boat I, before being sold to Pullmantur Cruises and reverting to her original name. In 2009 was sold to a new owner-operator, Peace Boat, which kept her until 2012. She was broken up in China later that year.

== Concept and construction ==
Oceanic was the first newbuilt ship ordered by Genoa-based Home Lines, which had been founded in 1946. She was ordered from the Cantieri Riuniti dell' Adriatico shipyard at Monfalcone, Italy. She was designed as a combined two-class ocean liner and one-class cruise ship, running line voyages from Cuxhaven, Southampton, and Le Havre to Canada during the Northern Hemisphere summer and cruising during the winter.

According to William H. Miller's book, Greek Passenger Liners, the main designer behind the ship was in fact Home Lines' executive vice president, Charalambos Keusseuglou, who drew up the plans together with Mr. Costanzi, who had designed the SS Galileo Galilei and SS Guglielmo Marconi of Lloyd Triestino. The ship included many forward-looking features that are still included in present-day cruise ships, such as a magrodome covering the pool area, and life-boats located not on the top of the ship, but on separate lifeboat bays, lower on the hull.

Oceanic was launched from drydock on 15 January 1963. She was originally to be launched a week before, but due to unusually cold weather in Italy, the launch had to be delayed. Her fitting out took over two years, until the ship was finally delivered to Home Lines in March 1965. By this time, the company had decided to abandon transatlantic service due to falling passenger numbers and the establishment of the associated Hamburg Atlantic Line. As a result, Oceanic never in fact was used on the Europe–Canada service. Home Lines (incorrectly) marketed her as "the largest ship ever designed for year-round cruises". In their marketing material, Home Lines also used British tonnage measurement for the ship (giving her tonnage as 39,000 GRT), even though she was registered in Panama, and by Panamanian measurements she was only 29,000 GRT.

== Service history ==
=== 1965–1985: Career with Home Lines ===
The ship in the 1960s, illustrated on its dinner mneu

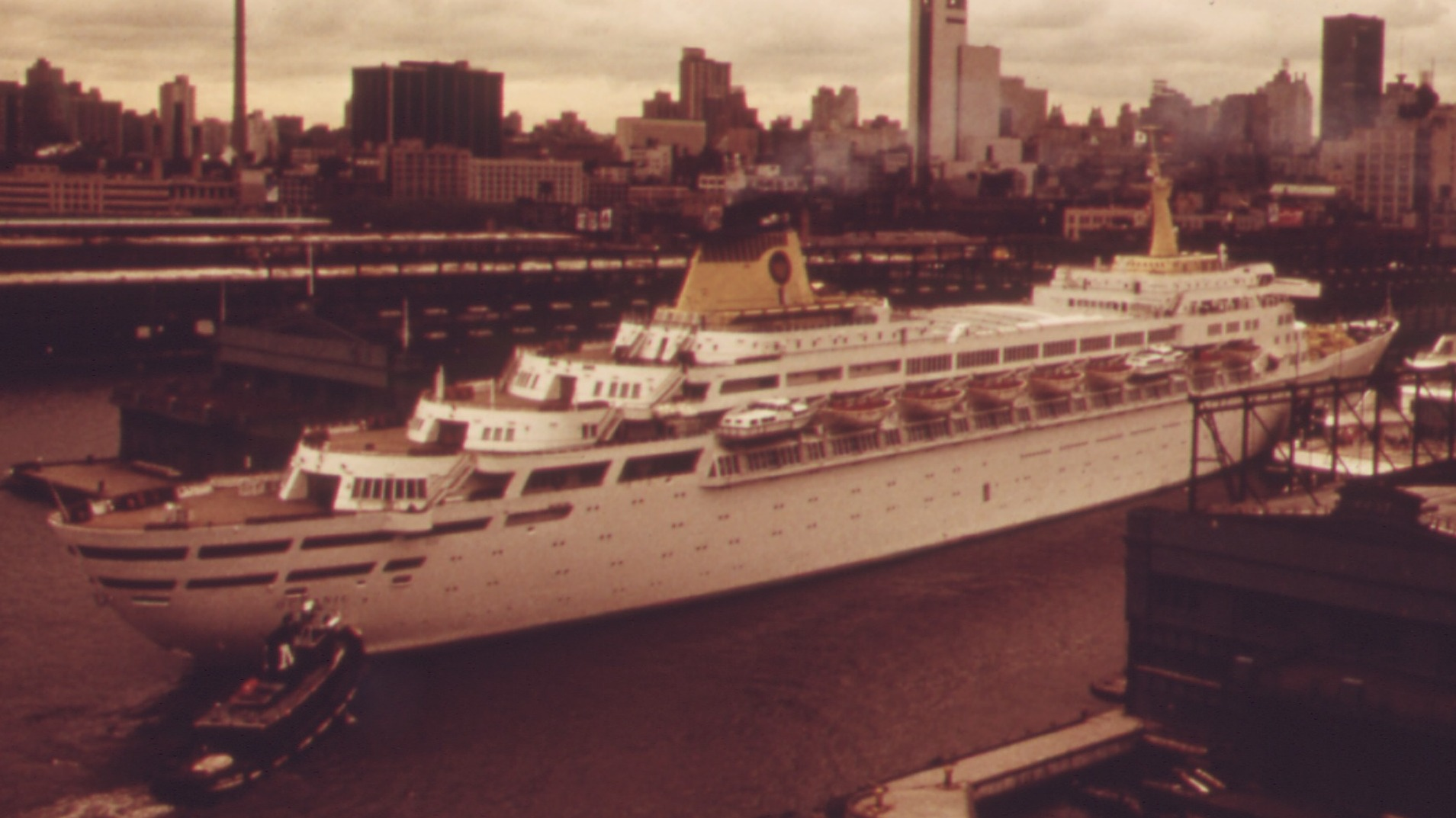
Oceanic in New York City in 1973

Oceanic was delivered to Home Lines in March 1965. On 31 March, she left on a transatlantic crossing with fare-paying passengers (only 200 of them) from Genoa to New York City. She made a short series of transatlantic crossings, following which she entered cruise service from New York to the Bahamas on 24 April 1965, operating in tandem with the company's older SS Homeric. During summers, Oceanic ran seven-day cruises from New York to the Bahamas with longer cruises to the Caribbean during the winter. Oceanic was one of the most successful cruise ships of her time, operating consistently at 95% capacity with cruises booked up to one year in advance.

In 1982, Home Lines took delivery of the new MS Atlantic, which supplanted the Oceanic as the company flagship. Another new ship, MS Homeric, was slated for delivery in 1986. In preparation for this, Oceanic was sold to Premier Cruise Line in 1985.

=== 1985–2000: Career with Premier Cruises ===
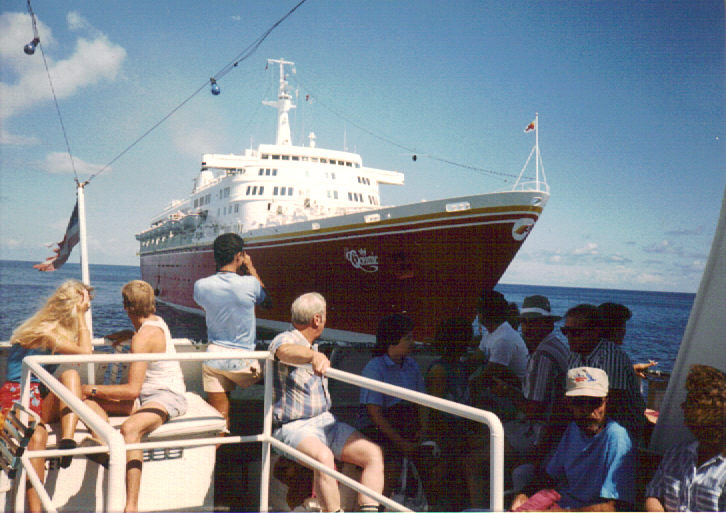
StarShip Oceanic repainted with the Premier Cruise Lines livery

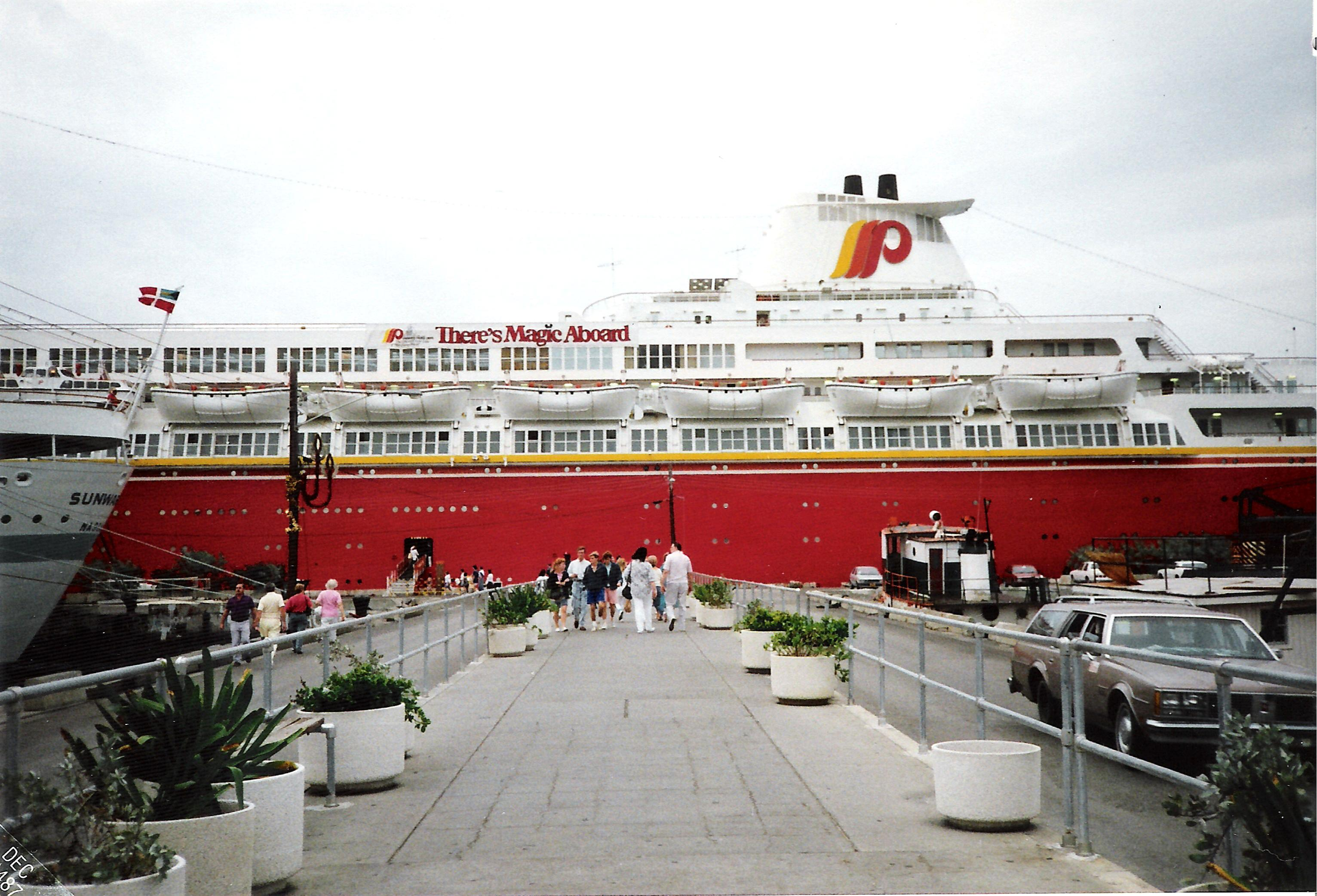
Oceanic at Nassau, Bahamas in December 1987

The Oceanic was renamed the StarShip Oceanic by Premier Cruise Lines and initially placed on three- and four-day cruises from Port Canaveral to Nassau and Salt Cay in the Bahamas. This cruise could be combined with a stay at Walt Disney World. Later, during her career with Premier Cruises, she was often marketed as the Big Red Boat before being renamed Big Red Boat I in 2000. However, Premier Cruise Line went bankrupt in September 2000. The Oceanic was detained by port authorities at Freeport, Bahamas, laid up and placed for sale.

=== 2000–2009: Career with Pullmantur Cruises ===
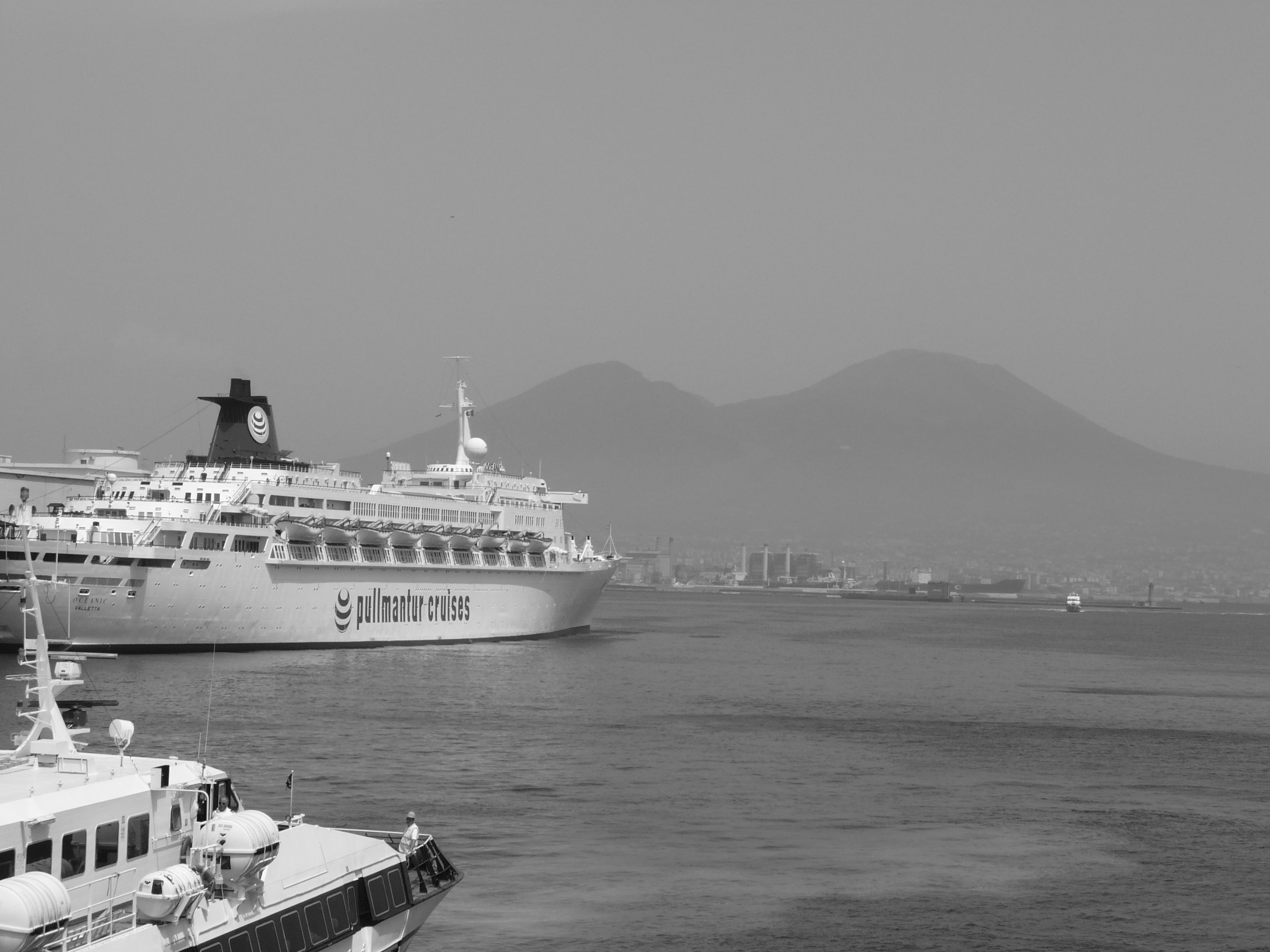
Oceanic photographed during her service with Pullmantur Cruises

On 30 December 2000, the Big Red Boat I was acquired by the newly founded, Spain-based Pullmantur Cruises. She reverted to the name Oceanic and sailed to Cádiz, Spain, for refurbishment. Following completion of her refurbishment, the ship entered service on cruises from Barcelona in May 2001. During her career with Pullmantur, Oceanic gradually had her flammable materials replaced in order to comply with SOLAS regulations that took effect in 2010.

Oceanic was reportedly due to be withdrawn from service with Pullmantur in September 2009. In March 2009, the ship was sold to the Japan-based Peace Boat, with delivery date already in April 2009.

=== 2009–2012: Career with Peace Boat ===
Oceanic entered service with Peace Boat on 23 April 2009, departing Yokohama on an around-the-world cruise that was due to conclude in Yokohama on 6 August 2009. Oceanic's circumnavigation was Peace Boat's 66th "Global Voyage for Peace", and the first to feature extensive visits to various ports in Scandinavia, with a goal of learning about the northern European welfare and education systems.

Sometime during the week between 3 and 9 May 2010, the Oceanic came under attack by pirates while off the coast of Yemen. The ship was attacked by grenades, but managed to avoid being boarded by adopting zig-zag manoeuvres and blasting the pirates with high-pressure water hoses. Reportedly the pirates were subsequently apprehended by NATO forces.

=== 2012: Scrapping ===
On Friday 5 May 2012, the Oceanic sailed to Yokohama on its last cruise for Peace Boat. The vessel returned to Pullmantur Cruises in exchange for the Ocean Dream, which became the new Peace Boat vessel. The Oceanic was sent to Zhoushan, China for scrapping in July 2012.
