= Premier Cruise Lines =

Former cruise line

- Type: Cruise line
- Industry: Leisure
- Founded: November 1982
- Founders: Bjornar K. Hermansen; Bruce Nierenberg
- Defunct: September 14, 2000
- Headquarters: Cape Canaveral, Florida
- Parent: The Greyhound Corporation (1985–1990); Greyhound Dial Corporation (1990); The Dial Corporation (1991–1996); Premier Cruises (1996–2000)

Premier Cruise Lines, a subsidiary of Premier Cruises, was a cruise line headquartered in Cape Canaveral, Florida. From 1985 to 1993, it operated as the official cruise line of Walt Disney World and used the trademark "The Big Red Boat," referring to the distinctive color scheme of some of its ships.

== Company history ==
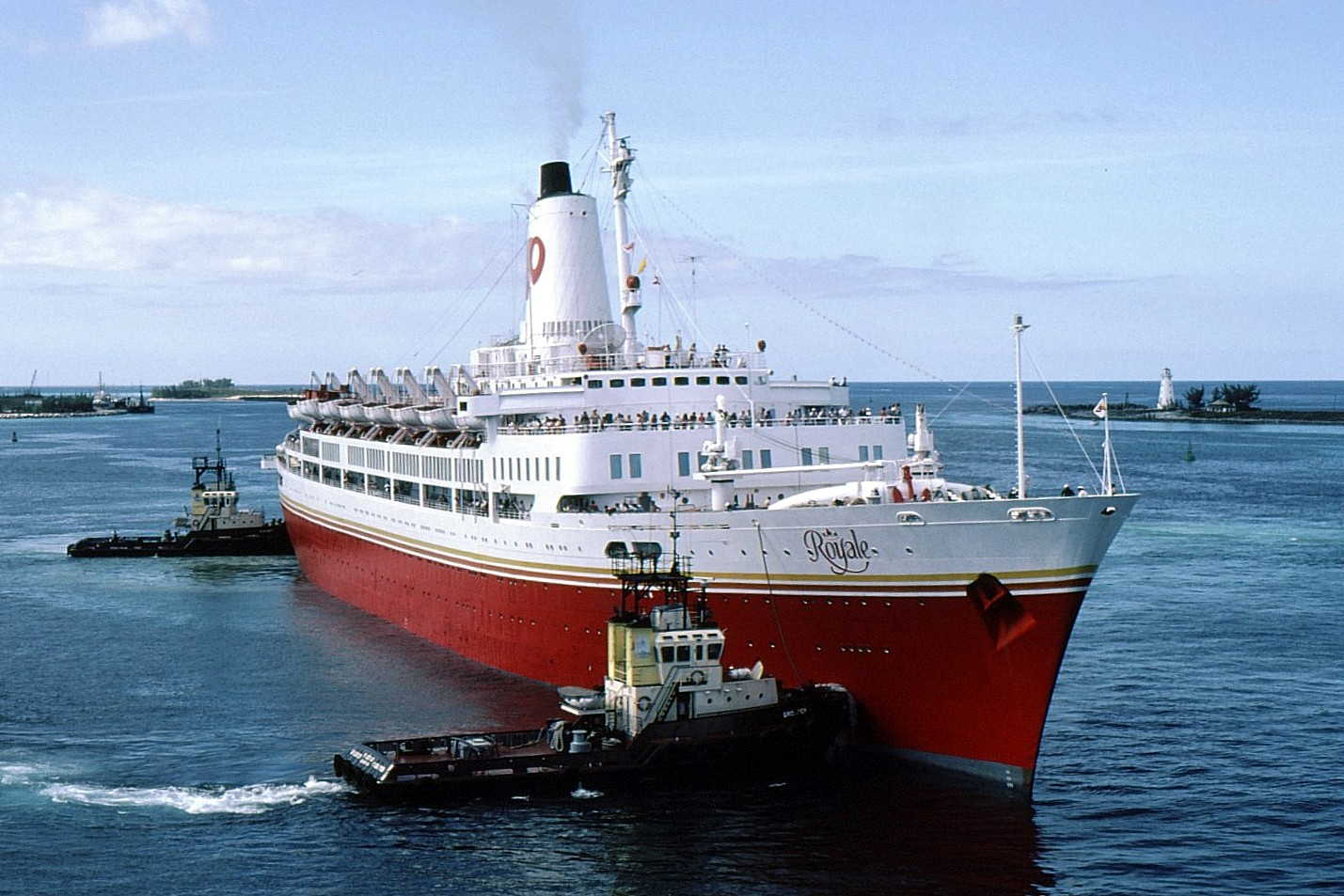
Premier Cruise Lines' first ship, the Royale

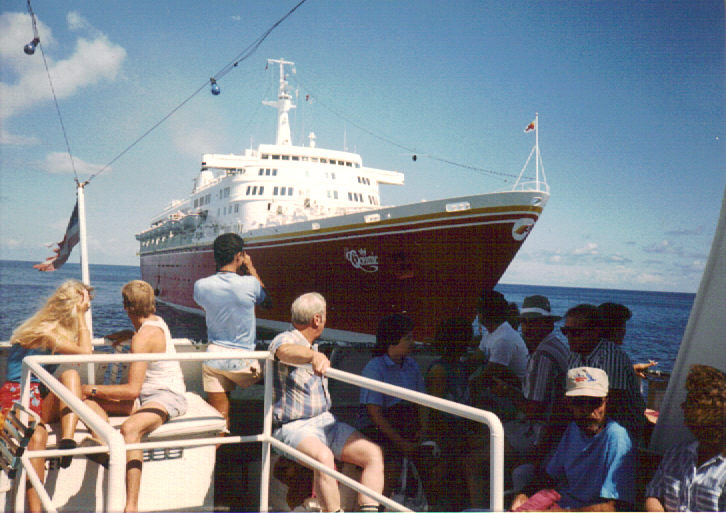
The Oceanic in September 1987

Premier Cruise Line was formed in November 1982 by Bruce Nierenberg of NCL with plans to begin operations in June 1983 with the aim of offering affordable family cruises. Prior to the company's inaugural cruise The Greyhound Corporation acquired an ownership stake. Bjornar Hermansen later joined the company in a senior leadership role before service began.

The company's first vessel was the former Federico C of Costa Cruises, which was acquired and renamed Royale. The ship was refurbished and repainted with a red hull, which led to the nickname "The Big Red Boat". The inaugural cruise was delayed until March 1984. Royale operated three- and four-night cruises from Port Canaveral to the Bahamas, typically calling at Nassau and Salt Cay, the company's private island destination in the Out Islands.

In 1985, Premier acquired its second ship, the Oceanic, from Home Lines. At approximately 40,000 GT, it was among the larger cruise ships in service at the time. In 1988, the Atlantic replaced Royale, and the company further expanded by acquiring Sun Princess from Princess Cruises, renaming it Majestic. The fleet was later marketed under the "StarShip" branding.

During the 1980s, the company reported annual gross revenues of approximately US$100 million.

Under the leadership of 20-year cruise veteran Jim Naik, the company returned to profitability, despite operating an aging fleet of Italian-designed ships competing against newer, larger vessels. Naik achieved profitability in his first quarter with the company.

Under CEO Bjørn Stensby, Premier expanded from one to six ships, operating itineraries in the United States, Bahamas, South America, the Caribbean, and Europe. By the fall of 1997, when Stensby resigned as chairman and CEO, Premier had grown to annualized revenues exceeding $200 million, an operating profit above 20%, and over 3,000 employees. With 5,500 lower berths, Premier Cruises was then the largest privately held cruise line in the world.

=== Walt Disney World partnership ===
Beginning in 1985, Premier entered into an exclusive agreement with The Walt Disney Company to offer a combined week-long land-and-sea vacation package. Under the arrangement, guests spent three or four nights at the Walt Disney World resort and three or four nights on a Premier cruise. Premier was also licensed to use Disney characters aboard its ships.

The exclusive arrangement ended in 1993. Premier continued to offer land-and-sea vacation packages with Disney but also introduced a similar package in partnership with Universal Orlando. Disney subsequently permitted other cruise lines to offer comparable packages. Disney's license allowing Premier to use Disney characters expired effective March 31, 1994. Premier thereafter licensed the Looney Tunes characters from Warner Bros.

In 1994, Disney announced plans to establish its own cruise line by 1998, later launched as Disney Cruise Line.

=== New ownership and rebranding ===
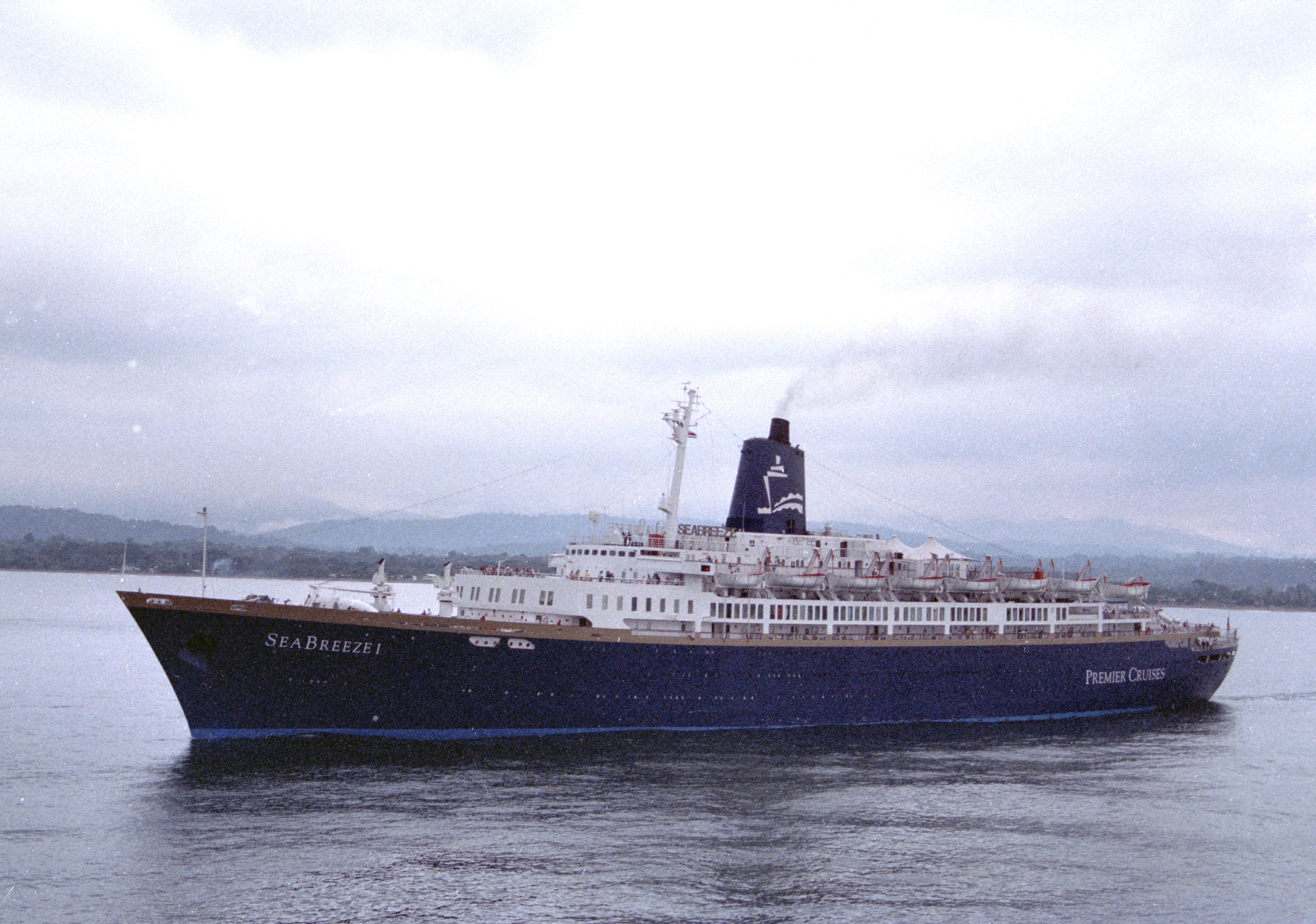
Seabreeze in the Premier Cruises livery

Premier's parent company, Dial, sold the cruise line after reporting profits in 1995, 1996, and 1997. New ownership and leadership followed, with Larry Magnan appointed president in 1998.

After the acquisition, the fleets of Premier Cruise Line, Dolphin Cruise Line, SeaWind Cruises, and Direct Cruises were merged and rebranded as Premier Cruises. A new ship profile logo was introduced, featuring blue funnels and blue hulls, except for the Oceanic, which retained its red hull. Premier also acquired the former SS Rotterdam, renaming her Rembrandt. The line's first ship, the former Royale (later Seabreeze under Dolphin Cruise Line), returned to Premier after nearly ten years.

Following the ownership change in 1997, the Atlantic was sold to MSC Cruises.

Under the new ownership and management led by Bruce Nierenberg, Premier revised its business strategy, ending marketing agreements with international partners including Thomson Holidays and Pullmantur, and repositioned several ships to the United States.

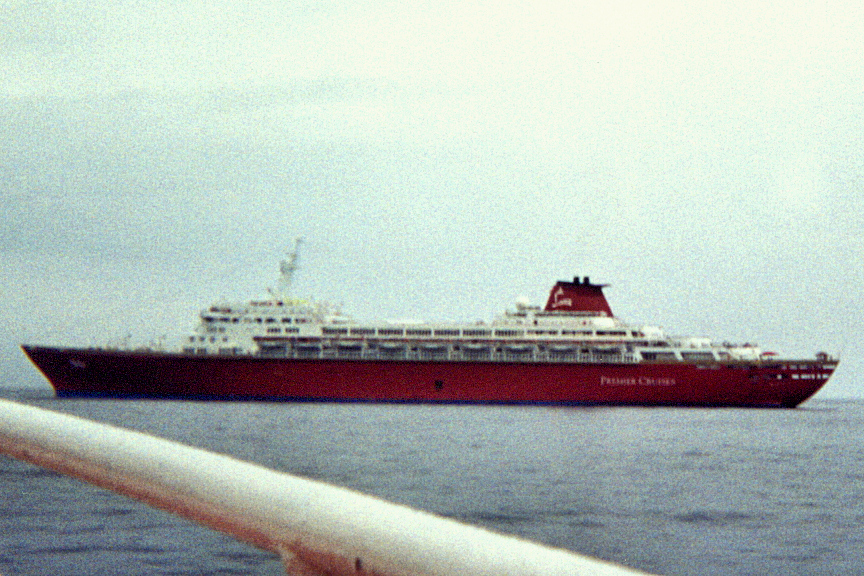
Oceanic in the Premier Cruises livery

In 1999, Premier rebranded again, reverting to the red "P" logo on a white funnel and introducing the "Seven Star Service" slogan. The company planned to rebrand its primary fleet as "Big Red Boats". Plans to rename Rembrandt as Big Red Boat IV were later canceled following public opposition to renaming the former Holland America flagship.

Premier announced plans to reorganize as Premier Cruises Corp., operating under the Big Red Boat brand, the MexiCruises brand (using Seawind Crown and planned charters of Triton and Odysseus), and a transitional "blue-ship" brand intended to include newbuilds and temporarily operate the SeaBreeze.

==== Newbuilds ====
In 1999, President Bruce Nierenberg announced that the blue-hulled new-ship brand would receive its first newbuild by the end of 2002, with an order projected to include at least five ships.

In March 1999, Premier bid to acquire the former Eugenio C, investing US$25 million in refits and renaming her Big Red Boat II. Later in 1999, the Oceanbreeze was chartered to Imperial Majesty Cruises, which purchased the vessel in May 2000.

In December 1999, Premier launched round-trip Mexico cruises from Cancún, chartering Triton from Royal Olympic Cruises. Due to low demand, the charter was canceled after one month, and the vessel was returned on January 2, 2000.

=== Bankruptcy ===
On September 14, 2000, Premier Cruises filed for bankruptcy and ceased all operations. Passengers on active cruises were docked and flown home on a first-come, first-served basis after the company's primary lender seized its fleet, which had been put up as collateral. The ship seizures disrupted vacations for about 2,800 passengers. Premier's Big Red Boat I in Nassau, Bahamas; Big Red Boat III in Cozumel, Mexico; and the Rembrandt and SeaBreeze in Halifax, Nova Scotia.

Premier's Seawind Crown, under charter to Spanish tour operator Pullmantur Cruises, continued operating in the Mediterranean. Most of the 1,700 passengers disembarked from the Rembrandt and SeaBreeze in Halifax were flown back to their points of origin, though several hundred boarded Big Red Boat II for its return voyage to New York, where it was reclaimed by Ocean Marine.

The shutdown resulted in approximately 270 shoreside employees at the company's Port Canaveral headquarters losing their jobs. Employees were informed of the shutdown upon arriving at work on September 14.

=== Legacy ===
The SS Oceanic (Big Red Boat I) remained in service until 2012, after which she was sent to Yokohama for scrapping. Big Red Boat II, formerly Eugenio Costa, was laid up in Freeport, Bahamas, until 2005, when she was sold for scrap and dismantled in Alang, India, later that year.

The former StarShip Majestic, later known as Ocean Dream, operated in Asia. In 2016, after changing ownership multiple times and being abandoned, Ocean Dream capsized and sank off Laem Chabang, Thailand, leaking oil into the Gulf of Thailand.

Big Red Boat III, formerly Carnival Cruise Line's Festivale, was also sold for scrap. The former Frederico C (renamed Seabreeze I) was en route to be scrapped in India when she sank in a storm about 220 nautical miles (407 km) off the Virginia coast.

Finally, the Rembrandt, formerly the Rotterdam, was purchased by the city of Rotterdam, the Netherlands, and preserved as a historic landmark.

== Former fleet ==
Ship	Built	In service with Premier	Tonnage	Status	Image
StarShip Royale; SeaBreeze	1958	1983–1988; 1997–2000	21,000 GT	Previously Federico C for Costa Cruises. Sank in 2000.	
StarShip Oceanic; Big Red Boat I	1965	1985–2000	38,772 GT / 39,241 GRT	Also known as Oceanic for Home Lines, Sold to Pullmantur Cruises in 2000 and to Peace Boat in 2009. Scrapped in 2012.	
StarShip Majestic	1970	1988–1995	17,042 GT	Previously Spirit of London for P&O Cruises and Sun Princess for Princess Cruises. Sold in 1995. Capsized and sank in 2016.	
StarShip Atlantic	1983	1988–1997	35,143 GT	Previously Atlantic for Home Lines. It later became the MSC Melody for MSC Cruises and the Qing. The ship sank at its berth in Goa, India in 2016. She was later refloated and sold for scrap in 2018.	
OceanBreeze	1955	1997–1999	20,204 GRT	Previously Southern Cross, Calypso, and Azure Seas. Sold for scrap in 2003.	
IslandBreeze; Big Red Boat III	1962	1997–2000	26,632 GRT	Also known as Transvaal Castle, S.A. Vaal, IslandBreeze, and Festivale. Sold for scrap in 2003.	
SeaWind Crown	1961	1997–2000	23,306 GRT	Previously known as Infante Dom Henrique and Vasco Da Gama. Scrapped in China, 2004.	
Rembrandt	1958	1997–2000	38,645 GT	Previously Rotterdam for Holland America Line. Converted into a hotel and museum in 2004.	
Big Red Boat II	1966	1999–2000	32,753 GRT	Also known as Eugenio C / Eugenio Costa for Costa Crociere, and Edinburgh Castle for Lowline Shipping. Sold for scrap in 2005.	
Triton	1971	1999–2000	14,194 GT	Built as the Cunard Adventurer, chartered from Royal Olympic Cruises for Mexico Cruises, charter was canceled after one month due to low bookings. Ship was returned to Royal Olympic Cruises.	

Timeline
