= SS Federico C. =

Ocean liner/cruise ship owned by Costa Line

Coordinates: 36.9059°N 72.1472°W

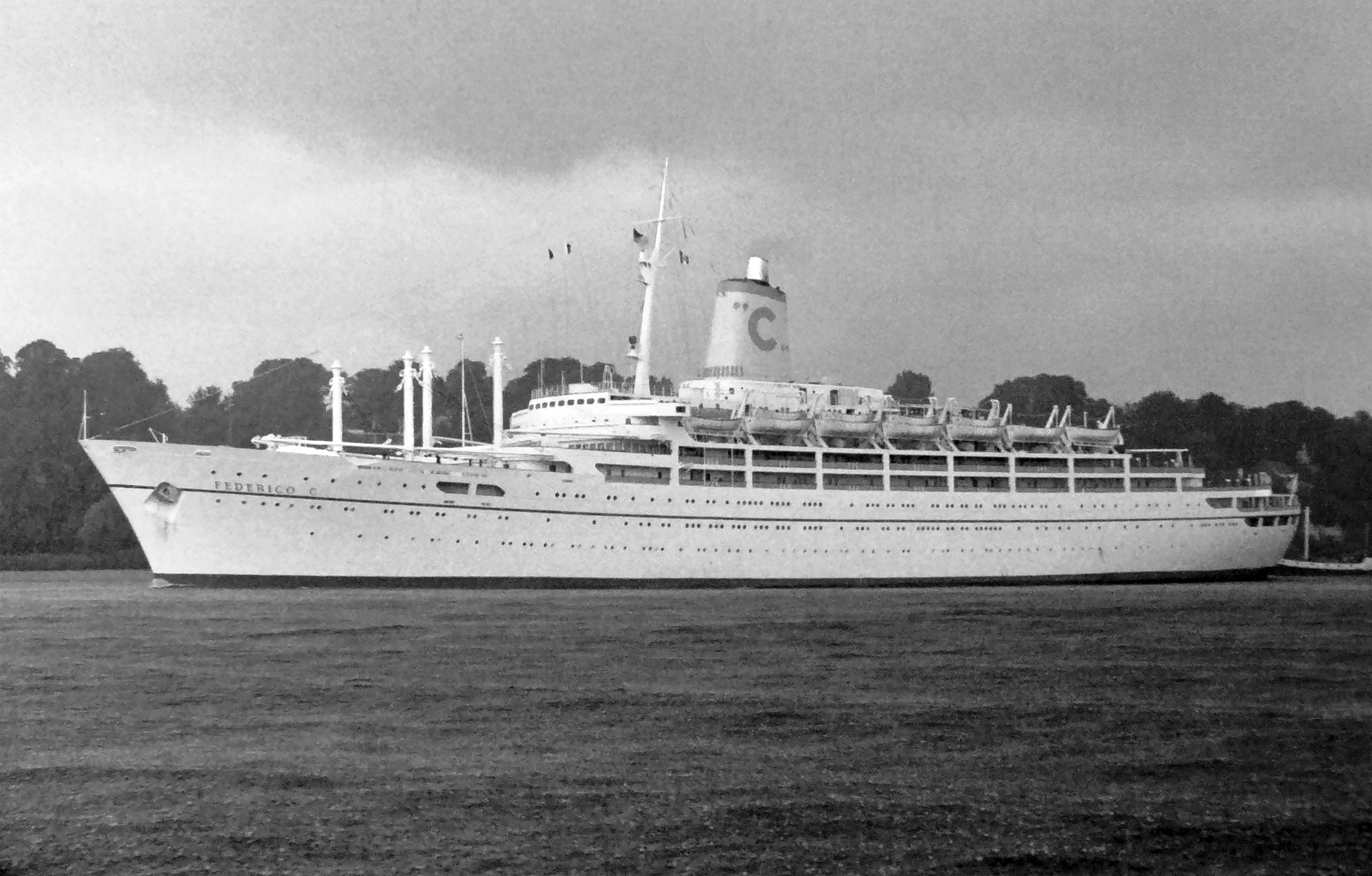
- Federico C. at Hamburg in 1969.

History
- Name: 1958–1983: Federico C.; 1983–1983: Royale; 1983–1988: StarShip Royale; 1988–2000: SeaBreeze
- Owner: 1958–1983: Costa Cruises; 1983–2000: Premier Cruises
- Operator: 1958–1983: Costa Cruises; 1983–1988: Premier Cruise Line; 1988–1997: Dolphin Cruise Lines; 1997–2000: Premier Cruise Line
- Port of registry: Panama (last registry)
- Builder: Gio. Ansaldo & C., Sestri Ponente, Italy
- Launched: 31 March 1957
- Completed: 1958
- Maiden voyage: 1958
- In service: March 1958
- Out of service: September 2000
- Refit: 1989
- Identification: IMO number: 5113230
- Fate: Sank off of Cape Henry on 17 December 2000.

General characteristics
- Tonnage: 21,000 GT
- Length: 605 ft (184.4 m)
- Beam: 79 ft (24.1 m)
- Depth: 8.6 m (28.2 ft)
- Decks: 9
- Propulsion: Two De Laval steam turbines making a combined 44,500 kW (59,700 hp)
- Speed: 21 knots (39 km/h; 24 mph)
- Capacity: 840 passengers
- Crew: 400

SS Federico C. was an ocean liner/cruise ship that made headlines when its passengers were unloaded mid-way through their cruise and the vessel was put under arrest in Halifax Harbour. The ship then sank in international waters three months later. At the time of the sinking, It was owned by International Shipping Partners and insured for $20M while its scrap value was estimated at $5–6M.

== History ==
The ship was launched on 31 March 1957 and completed in March 1958 by the Ansaldo Sestri Ponente shipyard in Italy as Federico C, the first new ship built for the Costa Cruises. The ship initially provided a liner service between Genoa, Italy and Buenos Aires, Argentina via Rio de Janeiro, Brazil. During that time, in 1963, Witold Gombrowicz traveled from Buenos Aires, Argentina to Europe on the ship. The famous Polish writer and playwright left his home country 24 years earlier aboard MV Chrobry, having been invited to take part in the maiden voyage of the latest addition to the Polish flotilla of liners. In 1966 Federico C was transferred to a service between Genoa and Florida, the Caribbean and Venezuela. The ship underwent a major refit in 1968, then added Caribbean cruises between trans-Atlantic trips. Federico C operated cruises exclusively from 1972 until 1983, when the ship was sold.

In 1983, Premier Cruises obtained the ship and named it Royale; it became StarShip Royale in the same year. In 1988, the ship was renamed SeaBreeze when it was placed in service for Dolphin Cruise Lines. One year later, the ship had been refurbished. Premier took possession of the ship when it acquired Dolphin in 1997. When Premier went out of business in September 2000, the ship was ordered to immediately cease operations and dock at Halifax Harbour. Some days later, it sailed to be laid up in Freeport, Bahamas.

== Sinking ==
On December 17, 2000, the ship sank off the coast of North Carolina/Virginia. The boiler allegedly broke off and damaged the ship.

The investigation into the sinking of Seabreeze I caused international concern, based upon numerous suspicious incidents, including the fact that the ship was likely to fetch only between $5 and $6 million for scrap, but had a $20 million insurance policy on it. The cruise ship sank in international waters flying the Panamanian flag, making Panama responsible for the investigation of the sinking.

The ship's captain told the United States Coast Guard rescuers that his boat was in imminent danger of sinking as a result of its engine room being flooded in high winds and 25-foot (7.6 m) seas. At the time, the Coast Guard rescuers believed that it was highly unlikely for a ship that large to sink that quickly, and were astonished when the Greek captain demanded that all hands be extracted from the ship, instead of requesting salvage tugs and trying to tow it to shore for recovery. Subsequently, all 34 crewmembers were rescued; there were no passengers on board.

At the time of the sinking, Steven Cotton of the International Transport Workers' Federation in London stated that he wished that the ship, which went down 225 nautical miles (417 km) off the Virginia coast, had gone down 25 nautical miles (46 km) closer to the coast because that would have put the case in the hands of American investigators. According to Cotton, "Panama's track record of carrying out comprehensive investigations into vessel sinkings is not very good."

The vessel had just been purchased by Cruise Ventures III, a subsidiary of New York-based DLJ Capital Funding, and was traveling from Halifax, Nova Scotia to Charleston, South Carolina.

== Gallery ==
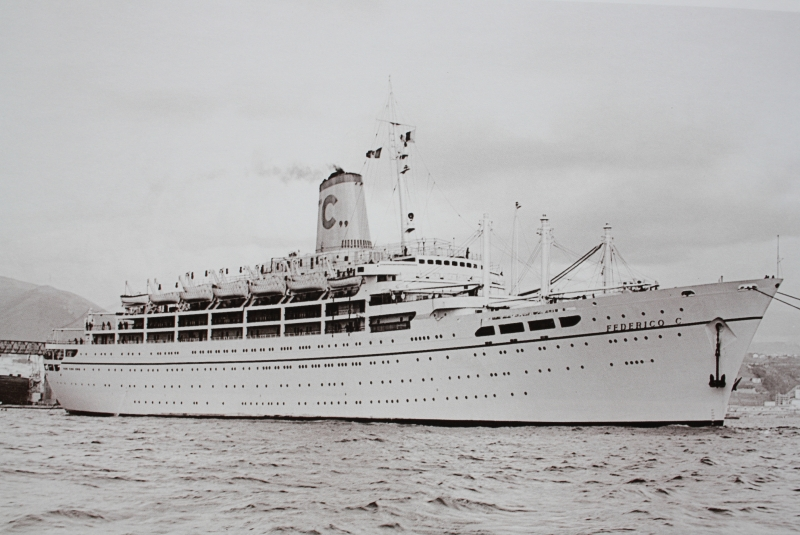
Federico C. on sea treals

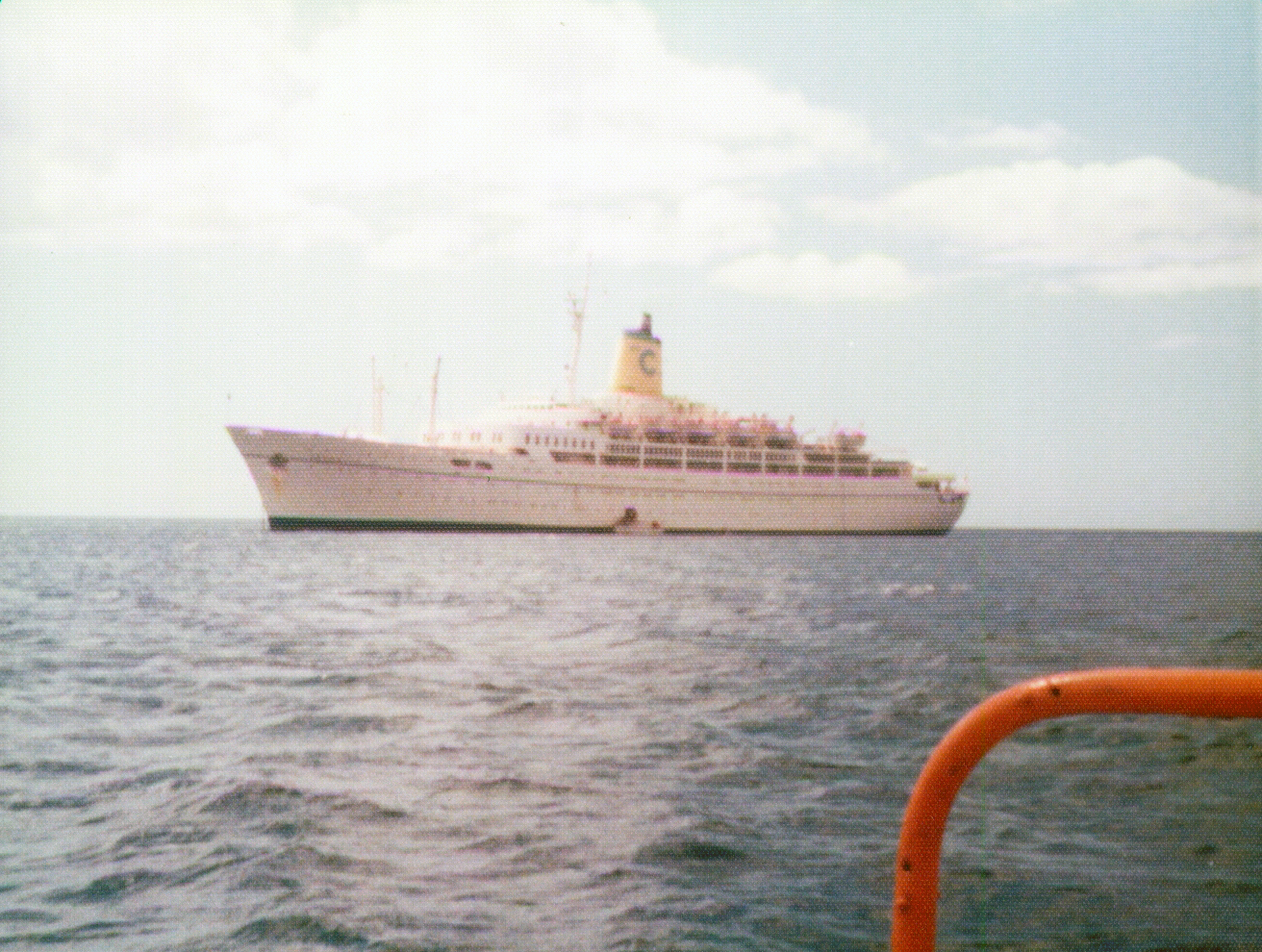
Federico C.

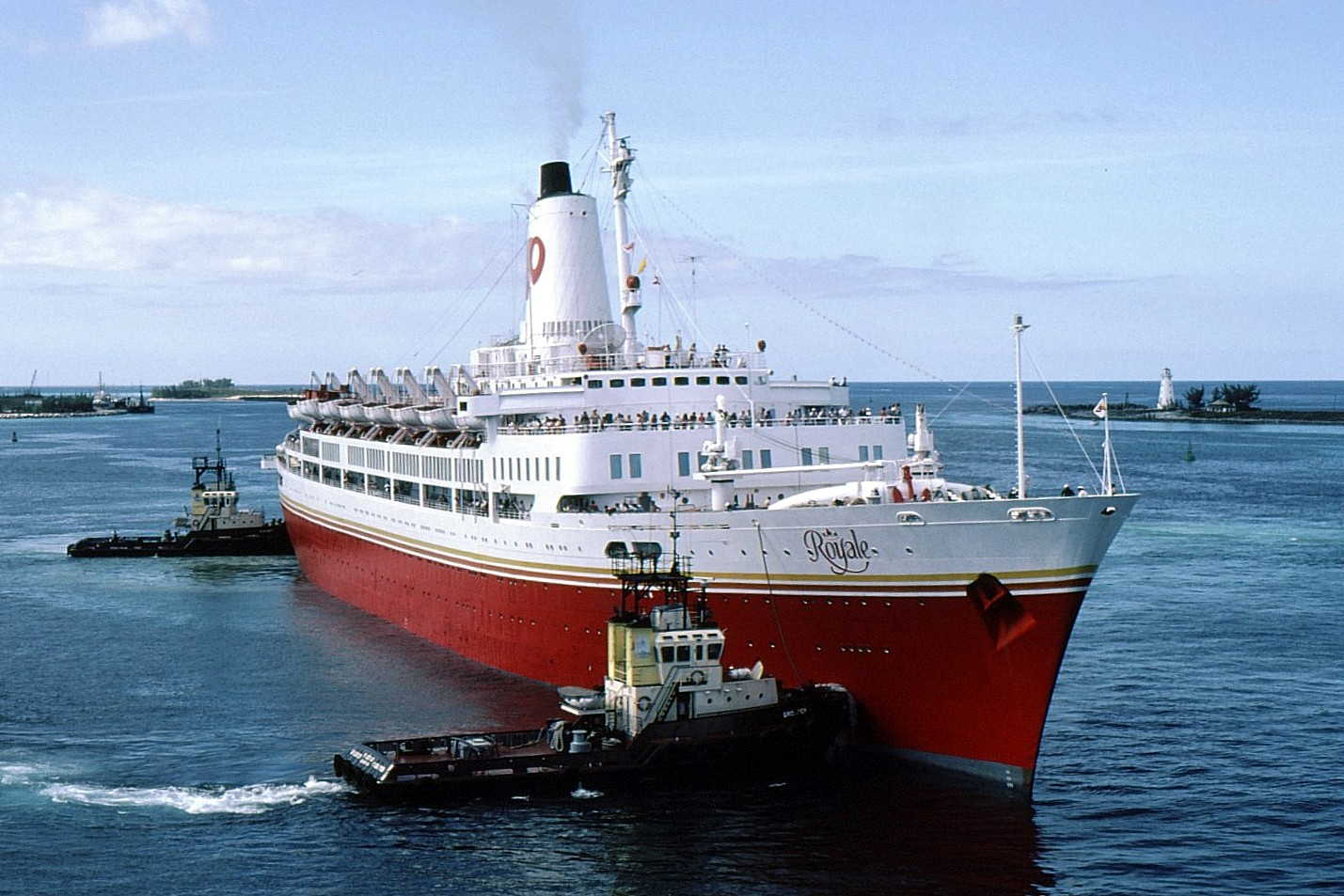
Royale of the coast of Nassau, Bahamas in 1985.

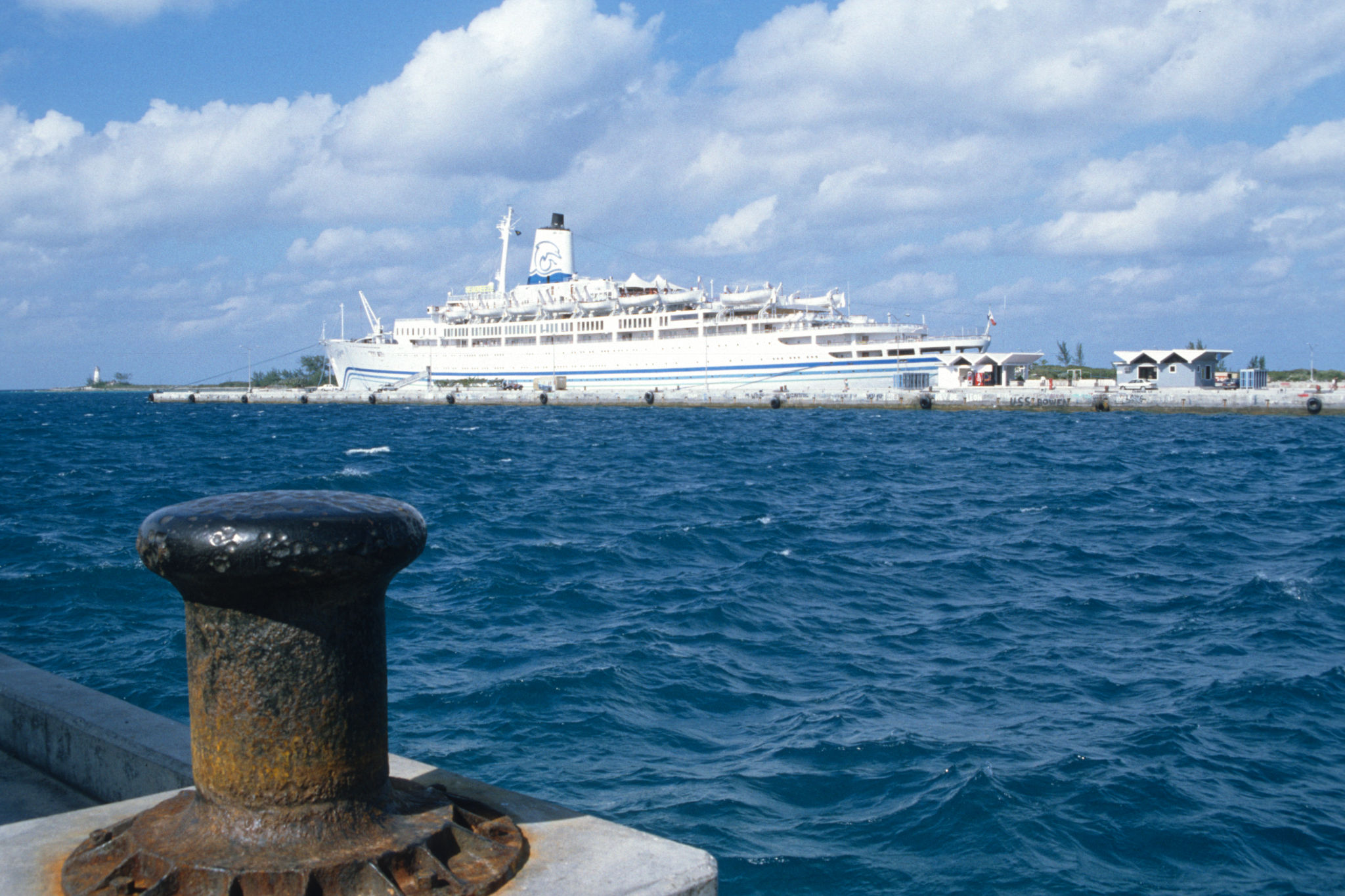
SeaBreeze in the port of Nassau, Bahamas in december 1995.

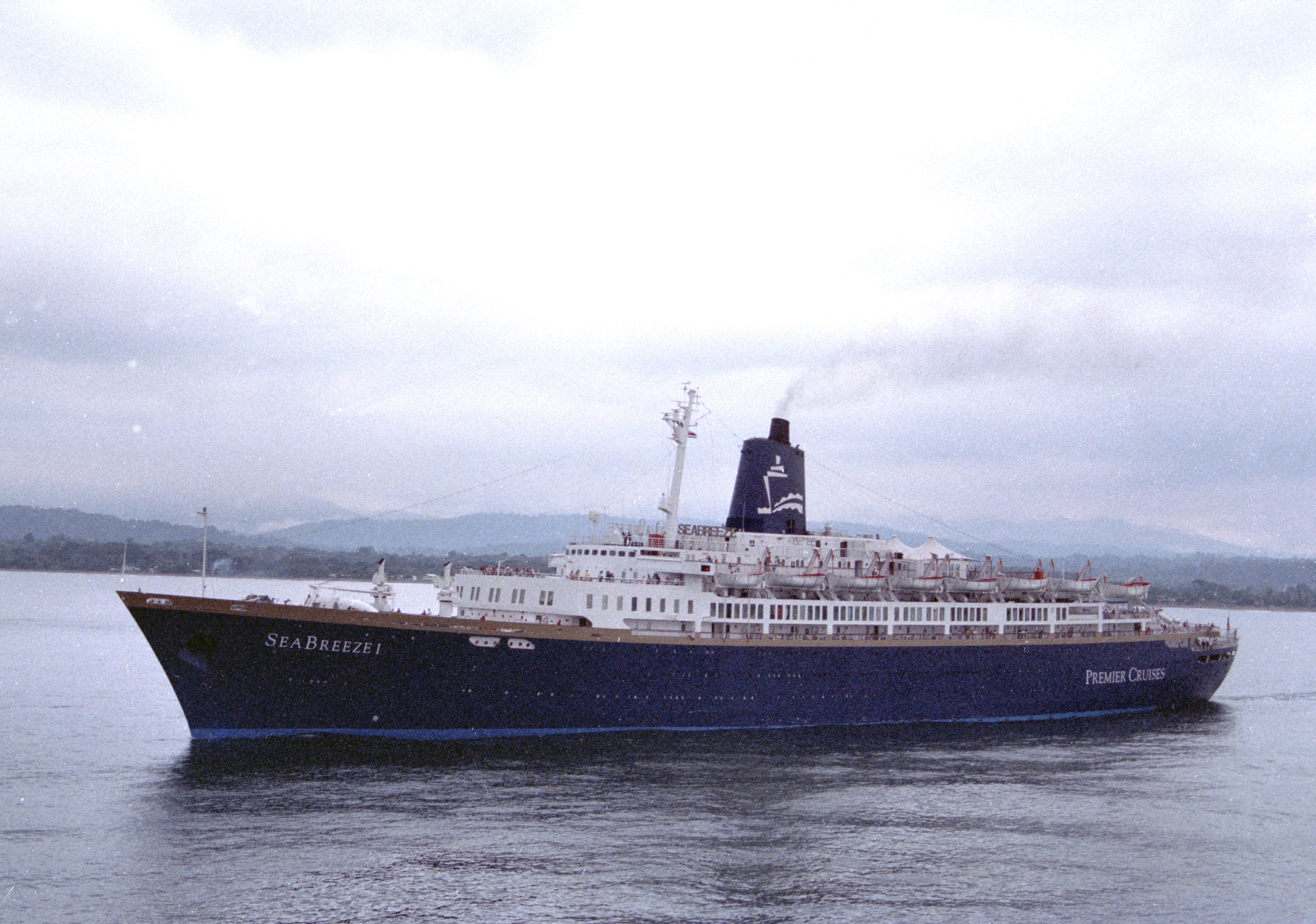
SeaBreeze of the coast of Limón, Costa Rica in 1999.

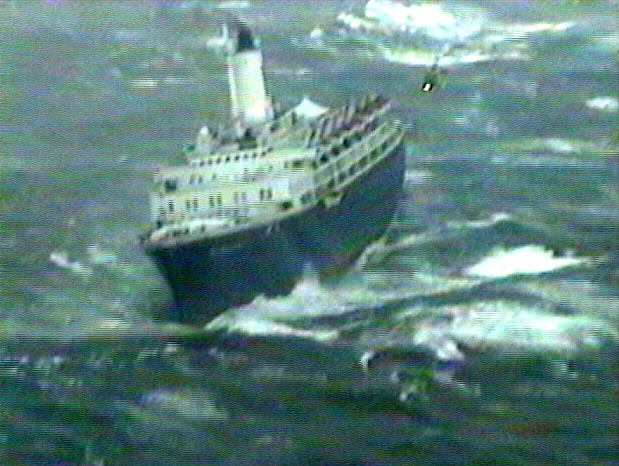
SeaBreeze sinking off of Cape Henry.
