= MS Melody =

Cruise ship

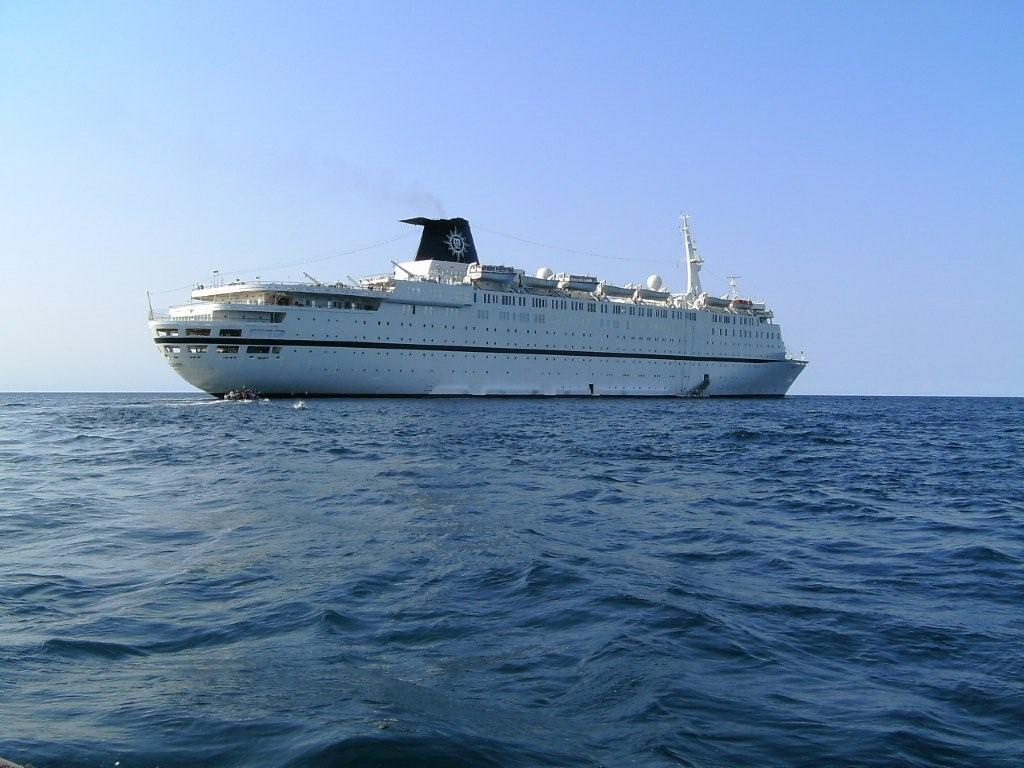
- Melody in April 2008

History
- Name: 1982–1988: Atlantic; 1988–1997: StarShip Atlantic; 1997–2013: Melody; 2013–2018: Qing
- Owner: 1982–1988: Home Lines; 1988–1997: Premier Cruise Line; 1997–2013: MSC Cruises; 2013–2018: Sahara India Pariwar
- Operator: 1982–1988: Home Lines; 1988–1997: Premier Cruise Lines; 1997–2013: MSC Cruises
- Port of registry: 1982–1997: Liberia, Monrovia; 1997–2013: Panama, Panama City; 2013–2018: India, Mumbai
- Builder: CNIM, La Seyne, France
- Cost: US$100 million
- Yard number: 1432
- Launched: 9 January 1981
- Completed: 1982
- Acquired: 2 April 1982
- Maiden voyage: 14 April 1982
- In service: 14 April 1982
- Out of service: 2013
- Identification: IMO number: 7902295
- Fate: Scrapped at Alang, India in 2018.

General characteristics
- Type: Cruise ship
- Tonnage: 35,143 GT; 7,000 DWT
- Length: 204.81 m (671 ft 11 in)
- Beam: 27.36 m (89 ft 9 in)
- Draught: 7.80 m (25 ft 7 in)
- Decks: 9 (passenger accessible)
- Installed power: Two 10-cylinder GMT-Fiat diesel engines; 22,070 kW (combined)
- Propulsion: 2 propellers
- Speed: 23 knots (43 km/h; 26 mph) (maximum); 19 knots (35 km/h; 22 mph) (service)
- Capacity: 1,062 (double occupancy); 1,600 (all berths)
- Crew: 535

MS Melody was a cruise ship, formerly owned and operated by MSC Cruises. She was built in 1982 by the CNIM shipyard in La Seyne, France for Home Lines as Atlantic. Between 1988 and 1997 she sailed for Premier Cruise Line as StarShip Atlantic. In 1997, the vessel entered service for MSC Cruises as Melody. In 2009 she repelled a pirate attack off Seychelles. She ended her career as an accommodation ship Qing, during which she sank in storm at her berth, and was scrapped in 2019.

== History ==
=== Home Lines – Atlantic ===
The Atlantic was built in 1982 by the CNIM shipyard in La Seyne, France, for Home Lines as their second purpose built ship. The ship was the second to take the name, after the previous SS Atlantic of 1948. In preparation for the delivery of the new Atlantic in 1982, the Doric was sold to Royal Cruise Line. When delivered in April 1982, the Atlantic took over the New York-Bahama-Bermuda cruise service. The ship's design was considered very dated for the 1980s, with an exterior that had unbalanced mix of classic and modern design elements; with no dedicated promenade deck, magradome pool area, and a traditional mast with crows nest. The Atlantic continued to operate for Home Lines until 1988, when the company was purchased by Holland America Line and its operation merged into those of Holland America. The Atlantic was sold to Premier Cruise Line, becoming Starship Atlantic.

=== Premier Cruises – Starship Atlantic "Big Red Boat" ===
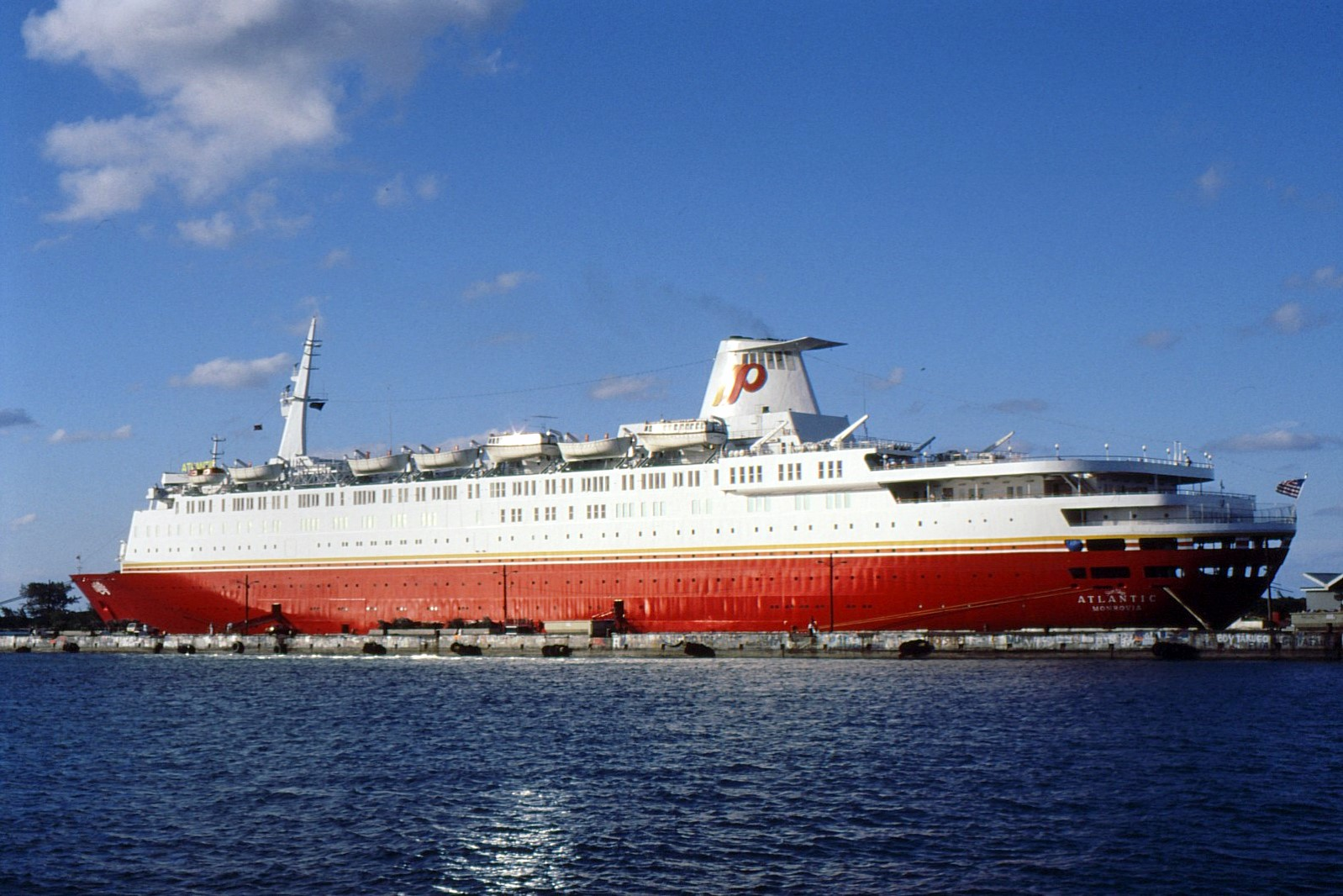
StarShip Atlantic at Nassau in 1989

In 1988, the Atlantic was purchased by Premier Cruise Lines, which repainted in its 'Big Red Boat' livery and renamed it the Starship Atlantic. The ship would join former fleetmate Oceanic, catering to the family cruise market with a partnership with Walt Disney World. The ship would continue to sail on routes similar to her Home Lines days with short cruises to the Bahamas. Following new ownership of Premier Cruises in 1997, the Atlantic was sold to the newly expanding MSC Cruises.

=== MSC Cruises – Melody ===
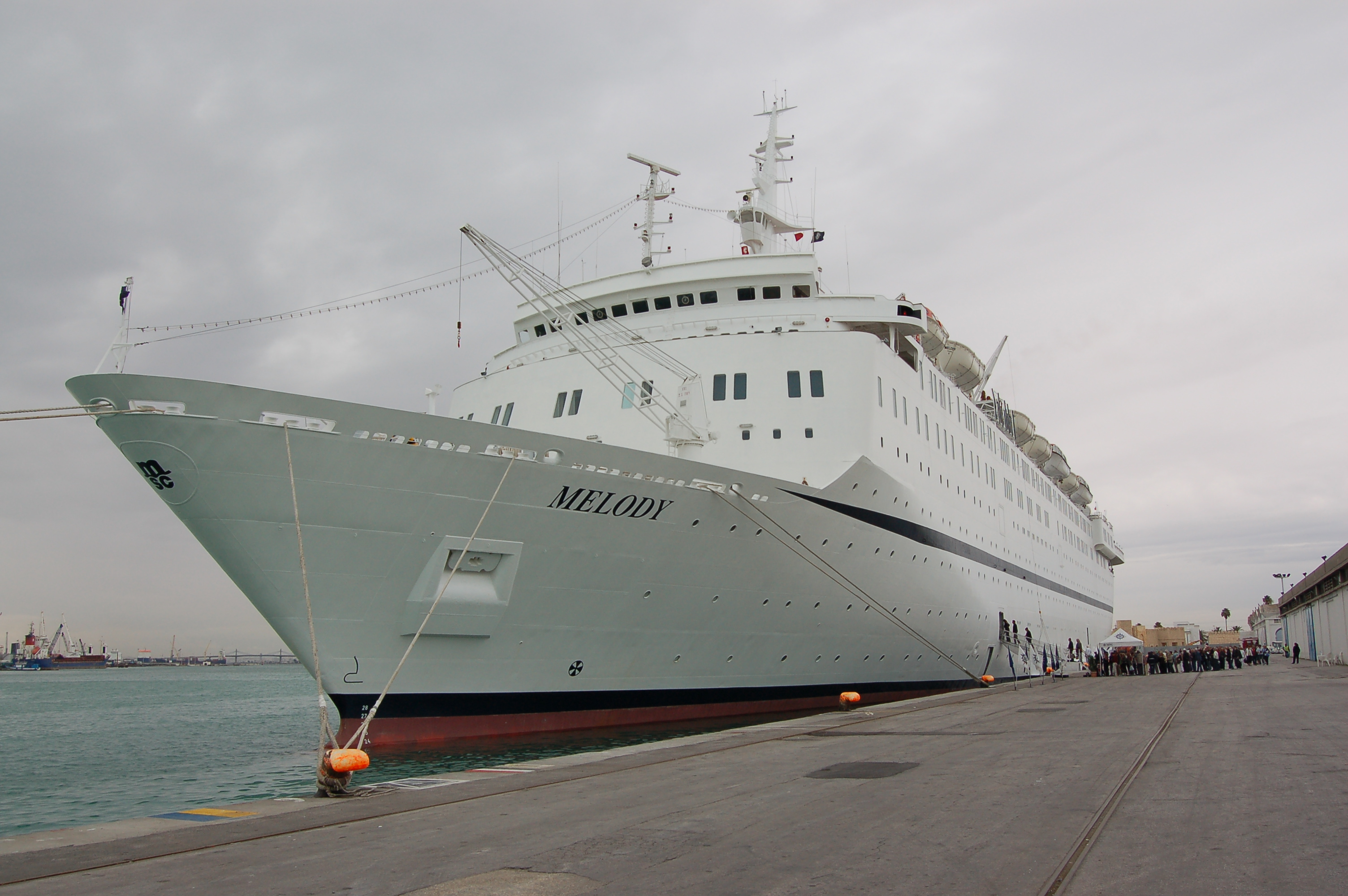
MSC Melody at La Goulette (Tunisi) in Tunisia, 2009

In 1997, the vessel entered service for MSC Cruises as Melody. She was remarketed as MSC Melody in 2004, but her official registered name remained Melody throughout her MSC career. She was retired in January 2013. She accommodated 1,076 passengers in 532 cabins. Her crew complement was approximately 535.

In July 2012, there was speculation that MSC Melody was to be chartered to new operators in Japan. The following month, it was reported that she had been sold to a South Korean company, Lotus Mine, and that as from February 2013 she would operate a regular service between Shanghai and Jeju Island, South Korea. However, she was de-commissioned following her final voyage for MSC Cruises in September 2012.

On 7 January 2013, MSC Cruises announced that MSC Melody had been retired effective immediately, despite being scheduled to sail through the summer season, and was listed for sale.

=== Qing – Accommodation ship ===
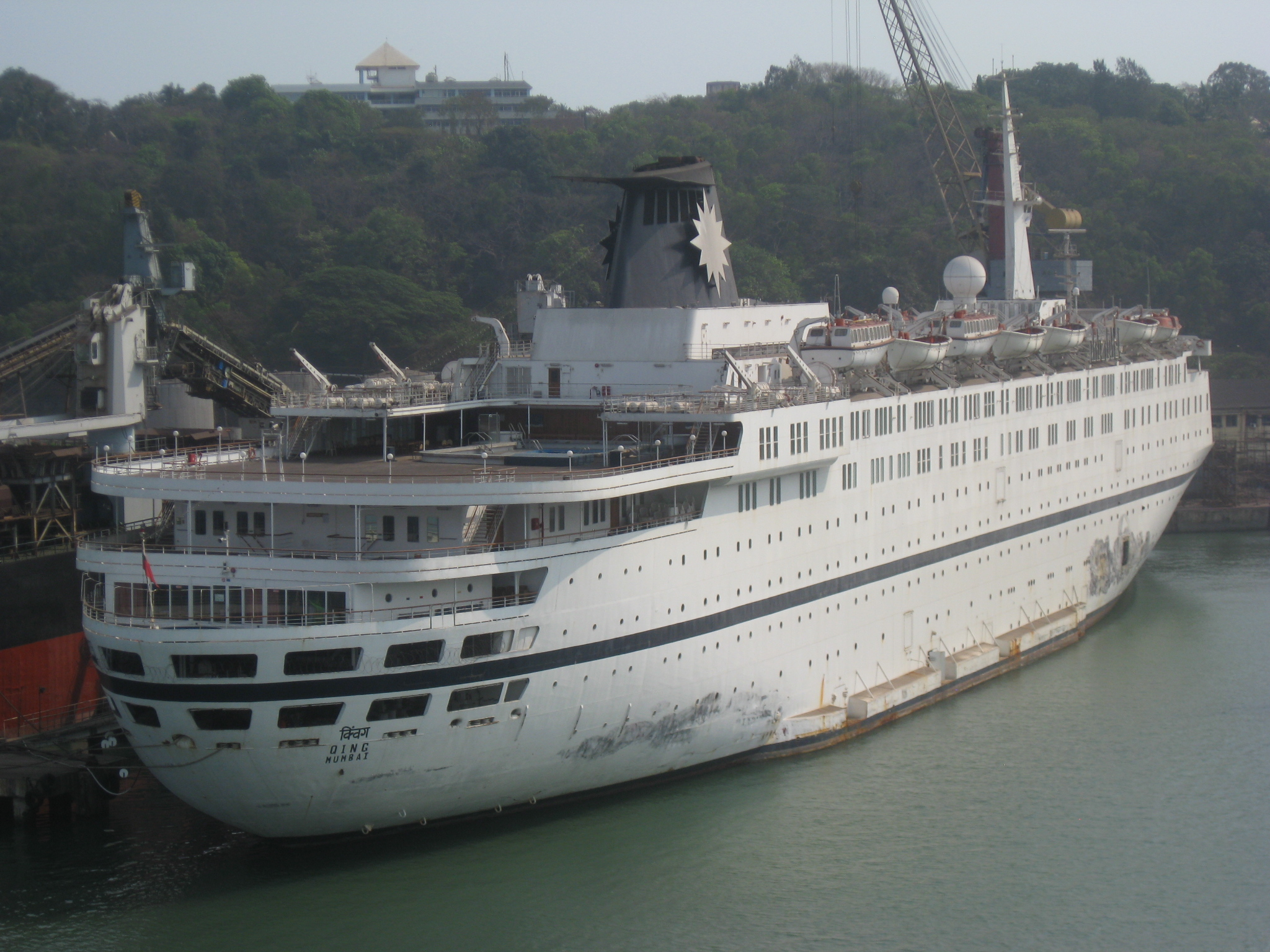
Qing at the shipyards of Goa during its conversion as hotel in 2014

In November 2013, she was sold for an undisclosed price to Sahara India Pariwar. Under the new name Qing, she was to be delivered in Goa, India, and converted into floating accommodation.

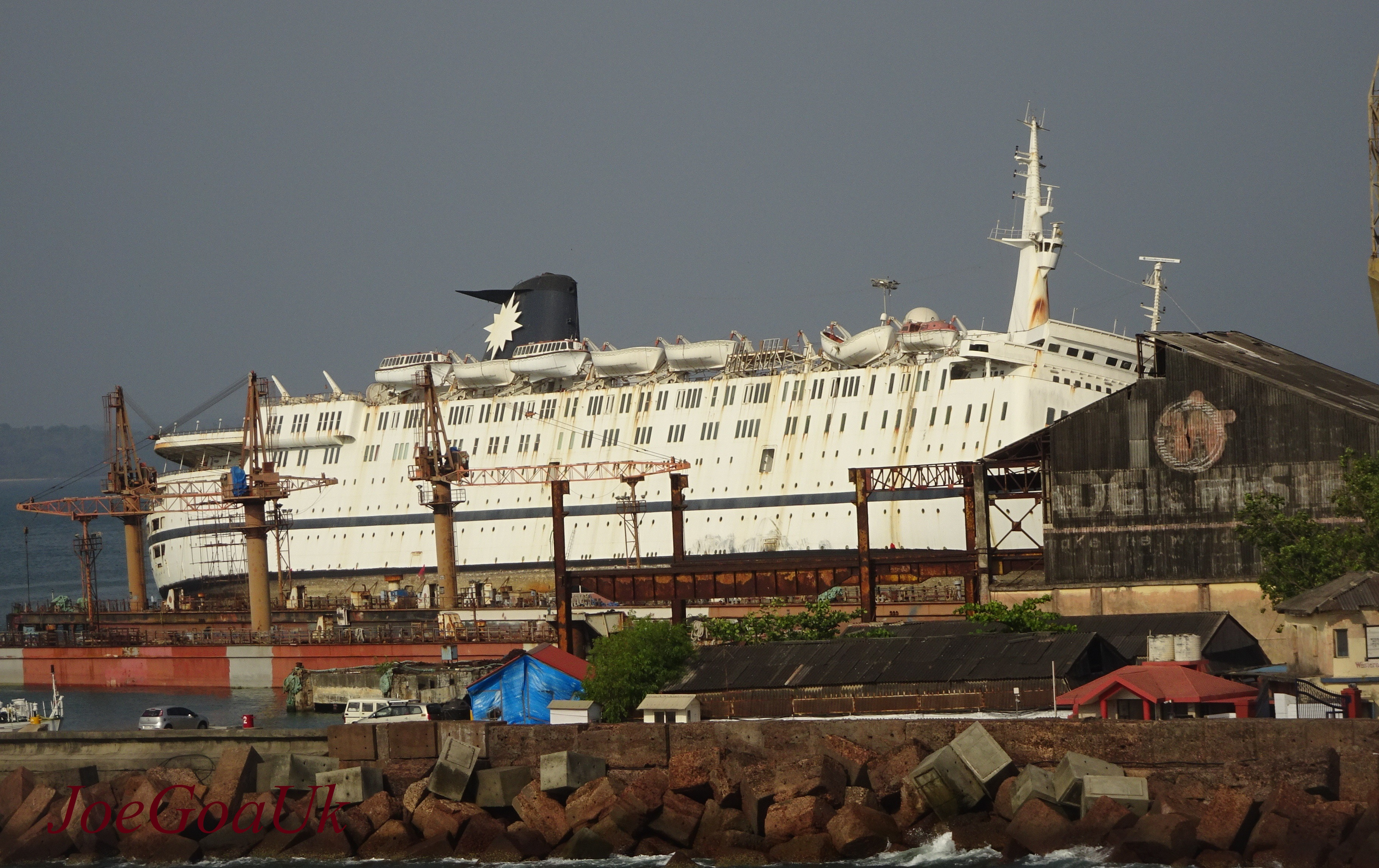
Qing at Mormugao in 2018

On 29 June 2016, the ship partially sank while docked in Goa. The sinking was caused by heavy monsoon rains and neglect. Nobody was on board at the time the ship sank. The ship was re-floated by a salvage company in June 2018. The ship was soon after sold for demolition and scrapping. The ship was towed and beached in Alang, Gujarat, India, in mid-2019.

== Incidents ==
=== Pirate attack ===
While on a repositioning cruise from Durban, South Africa, to Genoa, Italy, with some 1,000 passengers and 500 crew members on board, MSC Melody was attacked by Somali pirates on 25 April 2009 when approximately 300 km off Seychelles at around 11:25 p.m. local time (19:35 UTC). A speedboat with six people on board drew alongside the ship, fired at the bridge with an automatic rifle and subsequently the pirates attempted to board the ship. Media reports indicate passengers fought off pirates by throwing tables and deck chairs overboard before the ship's security personnel could be mobilized.

Later, the ship's Israeli private security detail attempted to repel the pirates by using the ship's fire hose and, when this failed, pistols. Pistol fire was successful in forcing the pirates to retreat, although after boarding their speedboat they continued to fire at the ship for another ten minutes. As a security precaution MSC Melody's original itinerary had been altered to allow her to circumvent some of the more pirate-infested waters. Additionally the Spanish auxiliary military vessel Marques de la Ensenada was scheduled to provide escort to MSC Melody through the Gulf of Aden, but she did not rendezvous with MSC Melody until the afternoon after the attack. The pirates that attacked MSC Melody were pursued and eventually captured by the Spanish frigate Numancia on 27 April 2009. The suspected pirates were turned over to authorities in the Seychelles.
