= Kristian Stensby =

Kristian Stensby is a Norwegian-American entrepreneur and businessman involved in the marine and particularly the cruise line industry. Kristian Stensby is the president and chief executive officer of Ocean Group.

== Background ==
Stensby spent 18 months in the Royal Norwegian Air Force (1975–76), before completing Section I of Norwegian Law Studies at the University of Oslo in 1978. In 1980, he earned a bachelor's degree in business administration from the University of Denver, and subsequently completed a foreign student program at San Francisco State University, earning him a Siviløkonom degree from the Norwegian School of Management (Handelshøyskolen BI) in 1982. Stensby first became involved in the cruise industry in an investor/investment banking capacity with a Norwegian investment company owned by Den norske Bank and later with Merrill Lynch.

== Career ==
In 1990, Stensby became the founder of Premier Cruises and acted as chairman and CEO up until 1997. Stensby also served as Treasurer of Kloster Cruise Limited (KCL), the parent company of Norwegian Cruise Line, Royal Viking Line, and Royal Cruise Line.

In 2002, Stensby was the founding partner of Ocean Group and has been involved in development projects within the passenger ship industry both on behalf of Ocean Group and related entities. Stensby was also the founder and promoter of the Ocean Residences ship, which together with Four Seasons Hotels and Resorts was planning to build and operate a fully private residence ship.
