= Spirit of London (ship) =

Cruise ship built in Italy in 1972

- Spirit of London being launched in 1972

History

Norway
- Name: Seaward
- Owner: Norwegian Cruise Line
- Ordered: Klosters Rederi
- Builder: Cantiere navale di Riva Trigoso
- Yard number: 290
- Laid down: 1970
- Acquired: Never
- Identification: IMO number: 7211517

United Kingdom
- Name: Spirit of London
- Owner: P&O
- Port of registry: London, England
- Launched: 11 May 1972
- Completed: 11 October 1972
- Acquired: 30 March 1971
- Maiden voyage: 11 November 1972
- Fate: Transferred to Princess Cruises 1974
- Notes: First diesel powered P&O's liner
- Name: Sun Princess
- Owner: Princess Cruises
- Port of registry: London, England
- Acquired: 1974
- Fate: Sold to Noel Shipping/Premier Cruises 1988
- Name: Starship Majestic
- Owner: Premier Cruises
- Route: Port Canaveral to Bahamas
- Acquired: 22 September 1988
- Fate: Chartered to CTC Lines 1994. 19 December 1996, Premier Cruises sold vessel to Bowyers Maritime Corporation.
- Notes: Renamed Majestic, followed by $6 million refit in Lloyd Werft shipyard, later renamed Starship Majestic Also operated as a Disney Cruise during this time.
- Name: Southern Cross
- Owner: CTC Lines
- Port of registry: Nassau, Bahamas
- Acquired: July 1995
- Identification: Call sign: C6HK9
- Fate: Sold to Festival Cruises 1998
- Notes: In February 1995, the ship sailed from the Caribbean to Birkenhead in order to be refitted by Coast Line.
- Owner: Bowyers Maritime Corporation
- Acquired: 1996
- Fate: Sold January 1997 to Festival Cruises
- Name: Flamenco
- Owner: Festival Cruises
- Acquired: 1997
- Fate: Sold to Cruise Elysia in 2004
- Notes: $9 million 45 day refit to meet the Festival standard
- Name: New Flamenco
- Owner: Cruise Elysia
- Acquired: 2004
- Fate: Sold to Club Cruise 2008

Panama
- Name: Flamenco I
- Owner: Club Cruise
- Port of registry: Panama City, Panama
- Acquired: 2008
- Fate: Sold at auction 2010
- Notes: Callsign : 3EAO9

Sierra Leone
- Name: Ocean Dream
- Owner: Runfeng Ocean Deluxe Cruises
- Route: Haikou, China to Halong Bay, Vietnam
- Acquired: 2012
- Notes: Call Sign: 9LY2427

Togo
- Name: Ocean Dream
- Owner: Ocean Dream Cruise
- Route: Pattaya, Koh kong, Sihanoukville
- Acquired: 2013
- Notes: Call Sign: 5VBW6

Panama
- Name: Ocean Dream
- Owner: Shanghai Eastime Ship Management
- Acquired: March 2014
- Fate: Sank off the coast of Laem Chebang, Thailand on 27 February 2016 and scrapped in situ
- Notes: Call Sign: 5VBW6

General characteristics
- Type: Cruise ship
- Tonnage: 17,042 GRT
- Length: 163.30 m (536 ft)
- Beam: 22.80 m (75 ft)
- Draught: 7.0 m (23 ft)
- Decks: 8
- Installed power: 4 × Fiat diesel engines
- Speed: 20.5 knots (38.0 km/h; 23.6 mph)
- Capacity: 760 (normal); 1,027 (maximum)
- Crew: 390

Spirit of London was an Italian built cruise ship that entered service with P&O in 1972. Afer being operated by a number of owners and being renamed New Flamenco, in January 2012 is was renamed Ocean Dream. After serving as a hotel ship it sank off Thailand in 2016 and was scrapped.

== Delayed construction ==
The vessel was originally ordered in 1970 by Norwegian Caribbean Line (NCL) as Seaward. The shipyard, Cantieri Navali del Tirreno & Riuniti, encountered financial troubles and was consequently taken over by the IRI Group, which canceled the building contract of Seaward. After much protest from NCL the IRI Group agreed to partially complete the vessel. Despite this NCL sold the hull to P&O, which would complete the Seaward as the Spirit of London.

Due to being originally ordered by the NCL Spirit of London had a sister ship in the NCL fleet, Southward. Both vessels' superstructures were identical, however the funnels differed. Although Southward was smaller in tonnage than Spirit of London, both were 537 feet long.

== History ==
In 1974, P&O bought Princess Cruises and transferred Spirit of London to its fleet, with Princess operating her as Sun Princess, alongside Island Princess and Pacific Princess.

In September 1979 whilst under charter to Mutual of Omaha and cruising from Portland to San Francisco, a fire broke out in the laundry room. Lifeboats were lowered to embarkation level but were not used as the fire was brought under control.

1988 saw the sale of Sun Princess by P&O to Premier Cruises, where it was initially named Majestic, becoming Starship Majestic in 1989 which included refurbishment of her interior. The majority of the Columbo 1975 episode "Troubled Waters" was filmed in the interior of the ship, creating a video time capsule of the ship's history before her refurbishment. During this time Premier Cruise Line became the licensed partner cruise line with Disney. In 1991, a fire in the auxiliary engine room sent passengers and crew scrambling for the lifeboats and left the ship dead in the water, resulting in the ship being towed back to Florida. In 1994, she was purchased by CTC Lines and renamed Southern Cross. She was renamed again in 1998 when Festival Cruises began operating her as Flamenco.

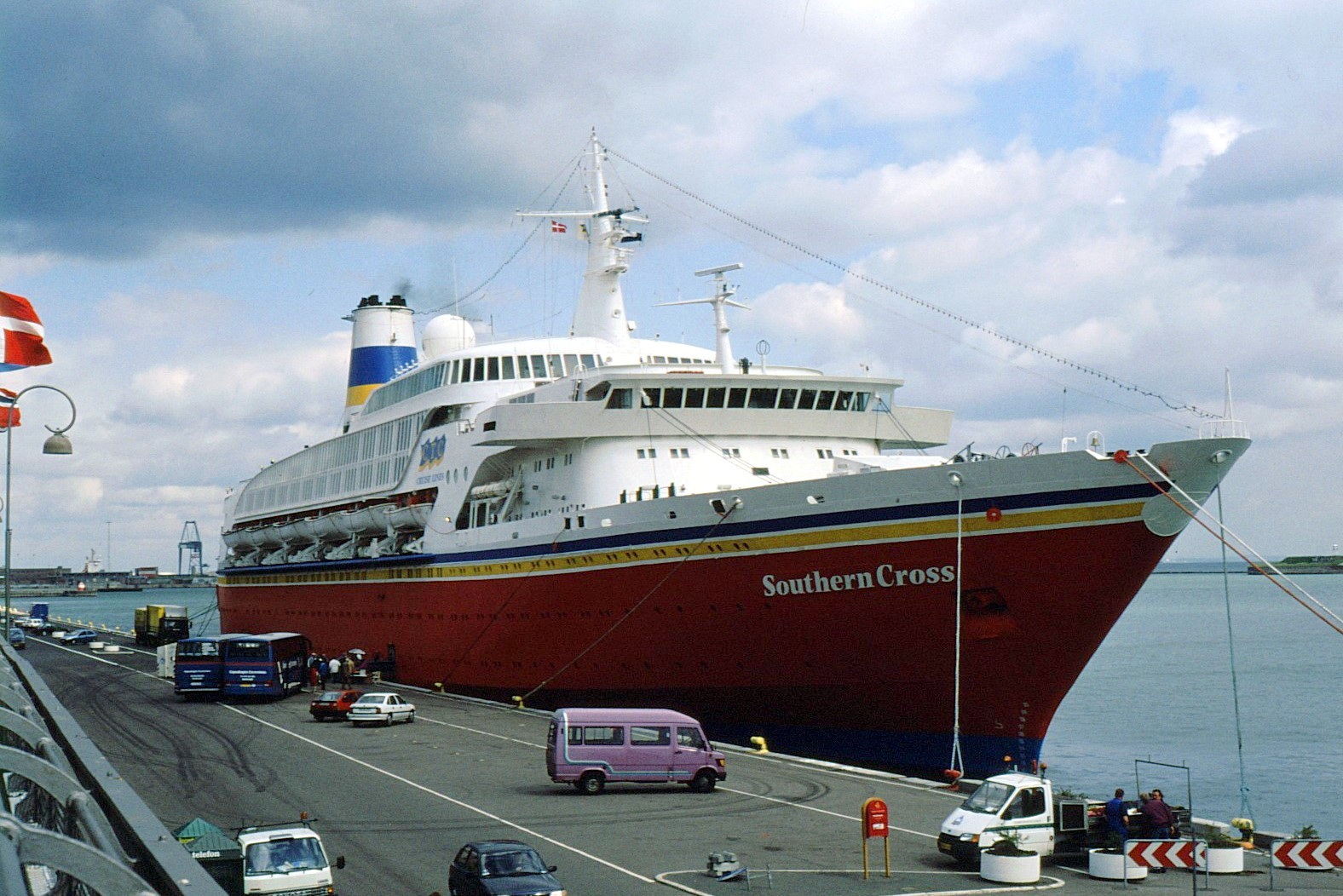
Southern Cross in Copenhagen, Denmark in 1995

When Festival Cruises collapsed in 2004, she was sold for $12.25 million at a bankruptcy auction to Cruise Elysia, who renamed her New Flamenco. In 2007 Club Cruise acquired New Flamenco. Club Cruise had New Flamenco serve as a hotel ship in New Caledonia until they failed in late 2008. The vessel was sold for scrap after over a year of lay up off Singapore. In 2012 the ship was saved from the scrapyard and was renamed Ocean Dream with a dragon painted on her bow. Then owned by Runfeng Ocean Deluxe Cruises, she began operating cruises from Haikou, China to Halong Bay, Vietnam.

=== Legal Dispute ===
On 13 February 2004, the ship, then known as The New Flamenco, was chartered by her then-owners, Cruise Elysia Inc to Fulton Shipping of Panama for a year. The ship was then purchased by Globalia Business Travel who assumed the rights and liabilities of the previous owners under the charterparty by novation. Globalia and Fulton extended the charter for two years in August 2005, to be returned on 28 October 2007. The charterparty was subsequently extended for another two years on 8 June 2007. Fulton subsequently disputed the last extension, and returned the ship on 28 October 2007. Globalia accepted this as an anticipatory repudiatory breach, and commenced arbitration against Fulton for breach of contract, seeking the net loss of profits they would have earned during the last two year extension. Globalia contended that Fulton had not actually suffered any loss because it managed to sell the ship at a substantial profit subsequently.

The case was appealed to the Court of Appeal, and subsequently to the Supreme Court. Lord Clark, delivering the unanimous judgment of the court, held that Fulton was liable for the net loss of profits Globalia suffered during the two year extension, and that the subsequent sale of the ship was res inter alios acta, and was not an act of mitigation.

== Sinking and scrapping ==
The ship capsized and sank off Laem Chabang, Sri Racha, Thailand in shallow water on 27 February 2016 after having been abandoned without crew or maintenance for about a year. An attempt to upright the ship was made but failed. It was decided the ship would be scrapped on site. Photos later taken show the ship undergoing demolition starting sometime in late 2017. By the end of 2019, much of the wreck that was still above the waterline had been removed.

== In popular culture ==
The ship appeared briefly in the 1975 Starsky & Hutch episode, "Terror on the Docks", and in the 1975 Columbo episode, "Troubled Waters". The majority of "Troubled Waters", which guest starred Robert Vaughn, was filmed in the interior of the ship, creating a video time capsule of the ship's history from the start of her life.

The ship was also featured in at least one episode of The Love Boat, involving a competition between Captain Stubing of Pacific Princess and the captain of Sun Princess, and in the original 1976 TV movie, The Love Boat. She was also featured in the 1980 film Herbie Goes Bananas.

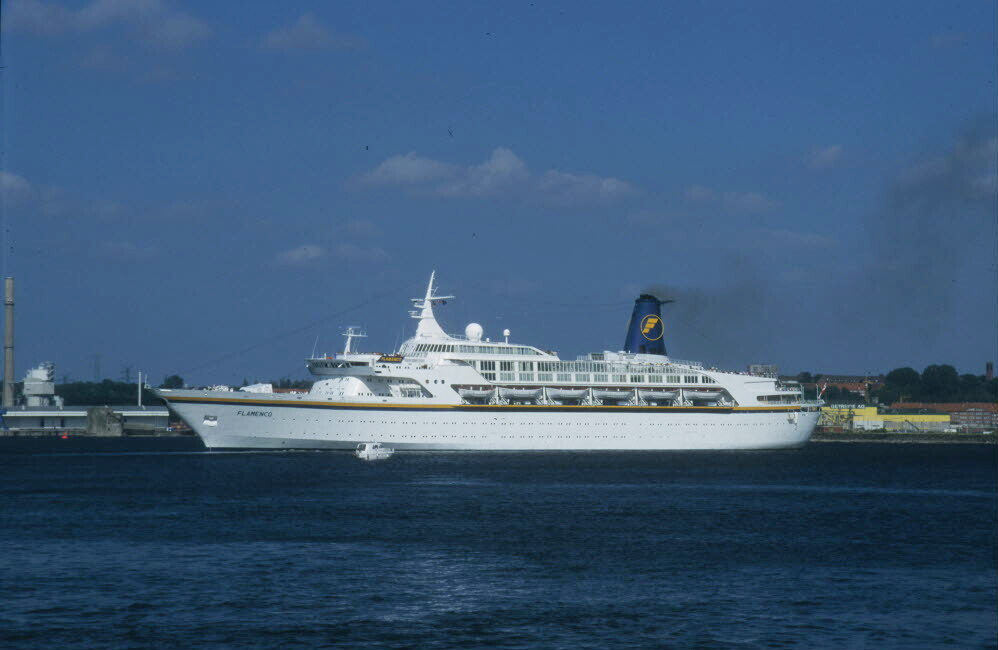
Flamenco in Kiel

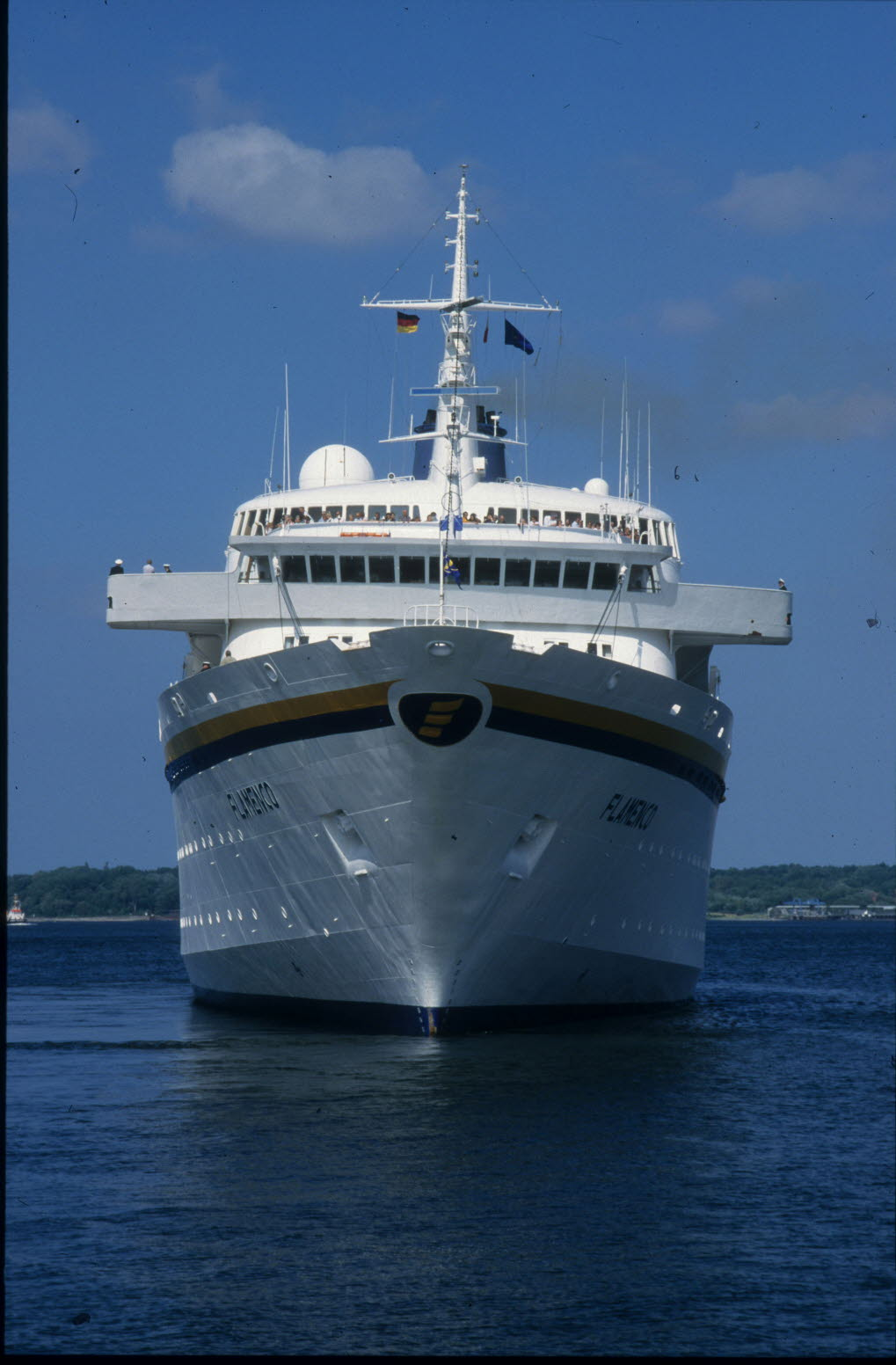
Flamenco in Kiel

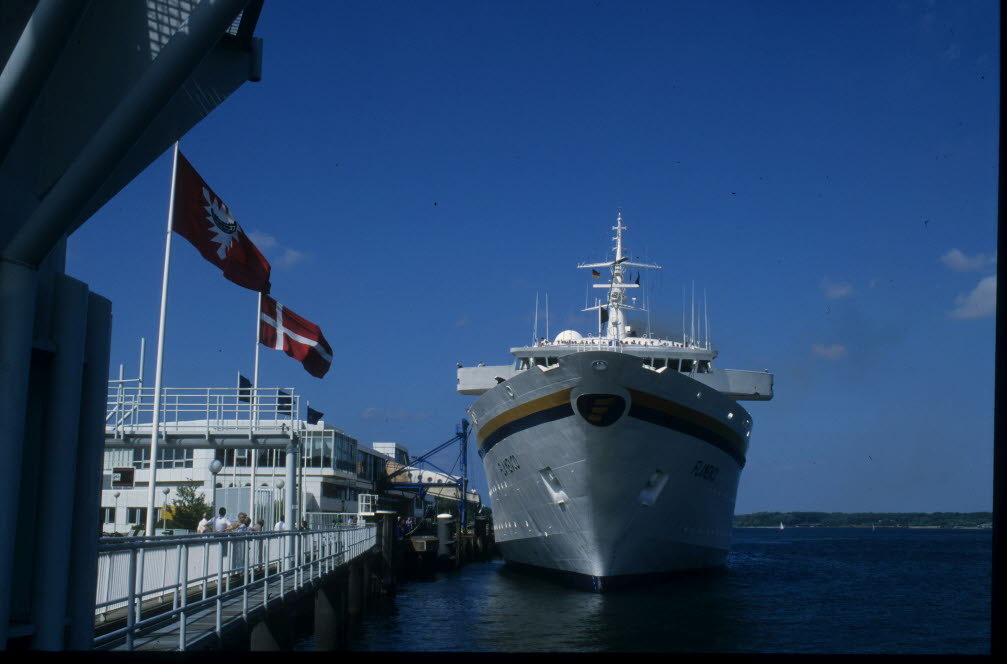
Flamenco in Kiel
