= Premier Cruises =

Former cruise line

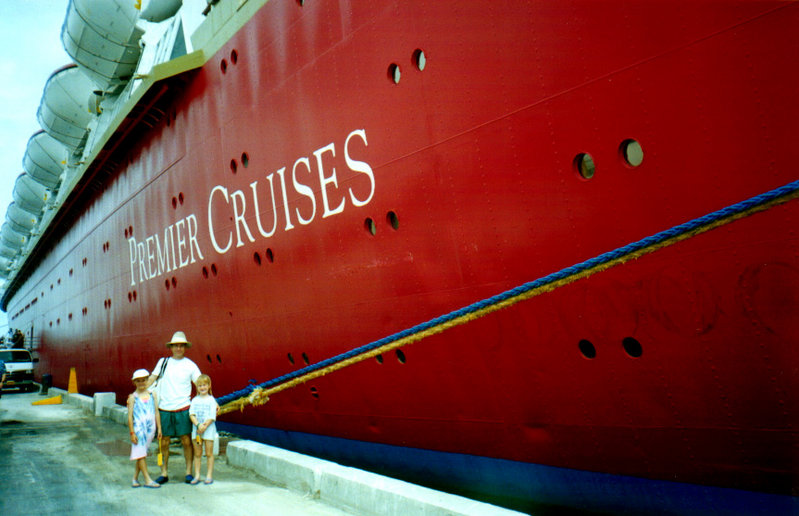
S.S Oceanic (The Big Red Boat: 2000) (pictured in 1998)

Premier Cruises was a cruise line holding company formed in the early 1990s, focusing on the family cruise market and expanding cruise operations into new geographic regions. The company’s business strategy centered on acquiring older cruise vessels, refurbishing them to offer a "traditional cruise experience," and operating them in regions such as Europe and South and Central America.

At the time, major cruise operators such as Carnival Cruise Line, Norwegian Cruise Line, and Royal Caribbean International were not prioritizing these markets. Premier Cruises primarily targeted European and South American customers through strategic marketing partnerships with leading tour and travel companies, including Thomson Holidays in the United Kingdom, TUI in Germany, Fritidsresor in Scandinavia, Alpitour in Italy, and Pullmantur in Spain (which was later acquired by Royal Caribbean International for $800 million). The company also collaborated with more than a dozen operators in South and Central America, such as CVC in Brazil, which was acquired by The Carlyle Group (63.6%) in January 2010 for $250 million. Premier Cruises maintained its main offices in Cape Canaveral and Miami, Florida.

== History ==
=== Premier Cruise Lines ===
Premier Cruise Lines was founded in 1983 by industry veterans Bjornar Hermansen and Bruce Nierenberg with the aim of offering affordable family cruises.

Starting in 1985, Premier entered into an exclusive agreement with The Walt Disney Company in which the companies would offer a land and sea vacation package. Guests would spend three of four nights at the Walt Disney World resort paired with a three- or four-night Premier cruise out of nearby Port Canaveral. Premier was also licensed to use Disney characters on board its ships.

Premier and Disney ended their exclusive arrangement in 1993. Premier continued to offer land and sea vacation packages with Disney, but also began offering a similar package with Universal Orlando. Disney also allowed other cruise lines to offer similar packages. To maintain its family-friendly image, Premier licensed the Looney Tunes characters from Warner Bros. After failing to secure another exclusive partnership, in 1994 Disney announced that it would create its own Disney Cruise Line by 1998.

=== Acquisition ===
The company was originally established as Cruise Holdings Ltd. in the early 1990s by shipping entrepreneur Kristian Stensby. Cruise Holdings later became known as Premier Cruises after acquiring Premier Cruise Line in 1996 and adopting its name.

Following the acquisition, Premier Cruises operated three distinct divisions. The company expanded its fleet by acquiring ships from Dolphin Cruise Line, Holland America Line, Thomson Cruises, SeaWind Cruises, and Direct Cruises.

From its inception, Stensby expanded Premier Cruises from a single ship to a fleet of six, operating itineraries in the United States, Bahamas, South America, the Caribbean, and Europe. By the time he resigned as chairman and chief executive officer in the fall of 1997, the company had annualized revenues exceeding $200 million, an operating profit of over 20%, and more than 3,000 employees. At its peak, with 5,500 lower berths, Premier Cruises was the largest privately held cruise line in the world.

After Stensby’s departure, Premier Cruises came under new ownership and management led by Bruce Nierenberg. The company shifted its business strategy, canceling marketing agreements with international partners such as Thomson Holidays and Pullmantur, and repositioning several ships back to the United States.

Several former marketing partners took this opportunity to establish their own cruise operations. Pullmantur in Spain launched Pullmantur Cruises following the end of its partnership with Premier. Royal Caribbean International later acquired Pullmantur Cruises in 2006. Similarly, Thomson Holidays expanded its own cruise operations, which later became part of TUI Group, the world's largest travel company.

In late 2000, Premier Cruises filed for bankruptcy and ceased operations.

=== Fleet ===
Several former Premier Cruises vessels remained in operation until recent years. The SS Oceanic ("Big Red Boat") was sold by Pullmantur (a Royal Caribbean subsidiary) in April 2009 to the Japan-based organization Peace Boat. The SS Rembrandt, formerly known as the SS Rotterdam, was purchased by an investor group in the Netherlands to be restored and preserved as a historic landmark in Rotterdam.

In 2012, the SS Oceanic was sold for scrap. The former Starship Majestic, later renamed Ocean Dream, continued operating in Asia. However, by 2016, the Ocean Dream—which had changed owners multiple times and was eventually abandoned—capsized and sank off the port of Laem Chabang, Thailand, leaking oil into the Gulf of Thailand.

== Former fleet ==
=== Acquired ===
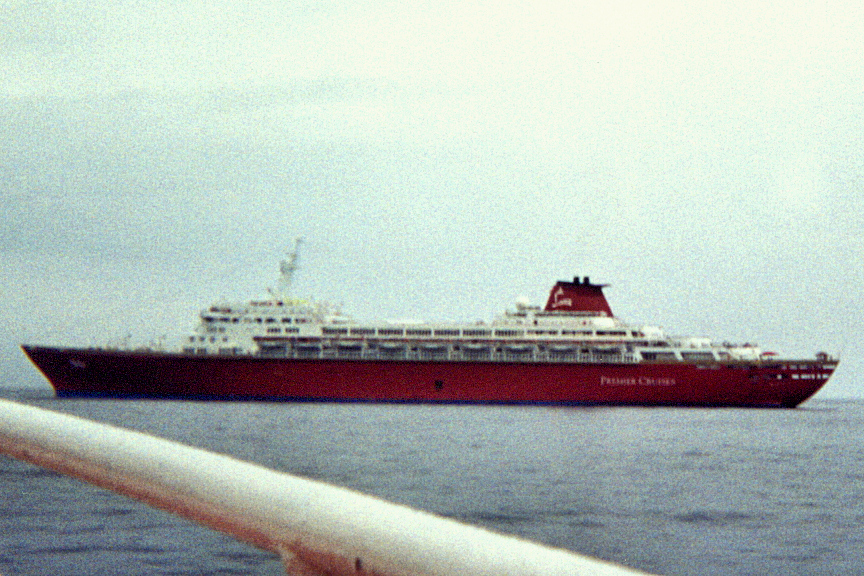
S.S Oceanic: 1996–2000, The Big Red Boat: 2000 (Note: Acquired from Premier Cruise Lines)

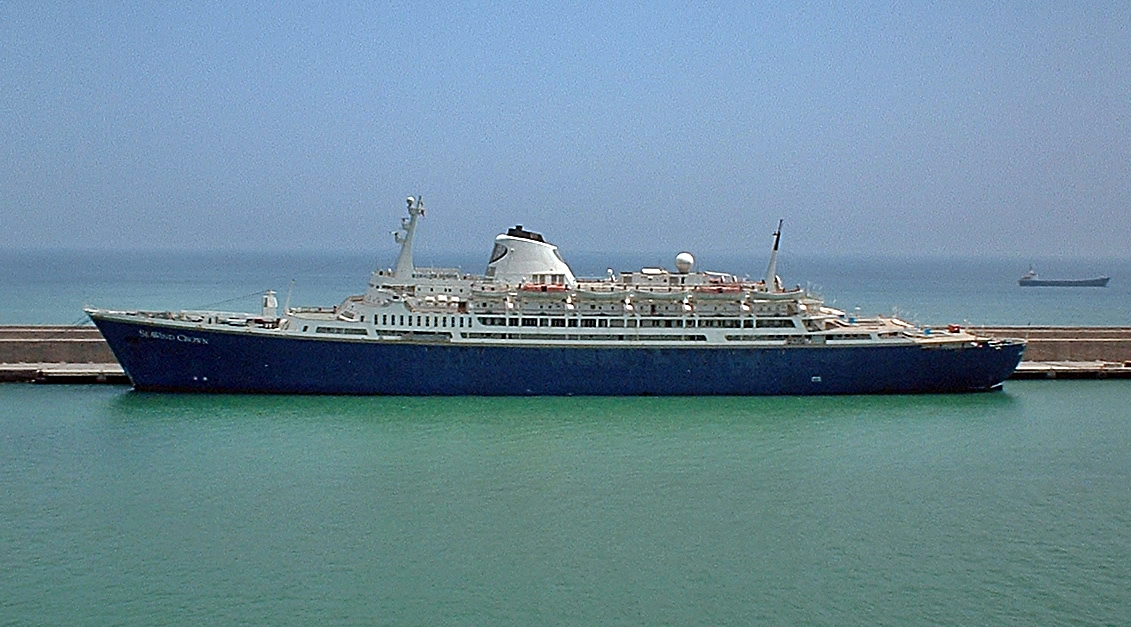
S.S SeaWind Crown: 1996–1999 (Note: Acquired from SeaWind Cruises, But previously known as Companhia Colonial de Navegacao flagship the Infante Dom Henrique)

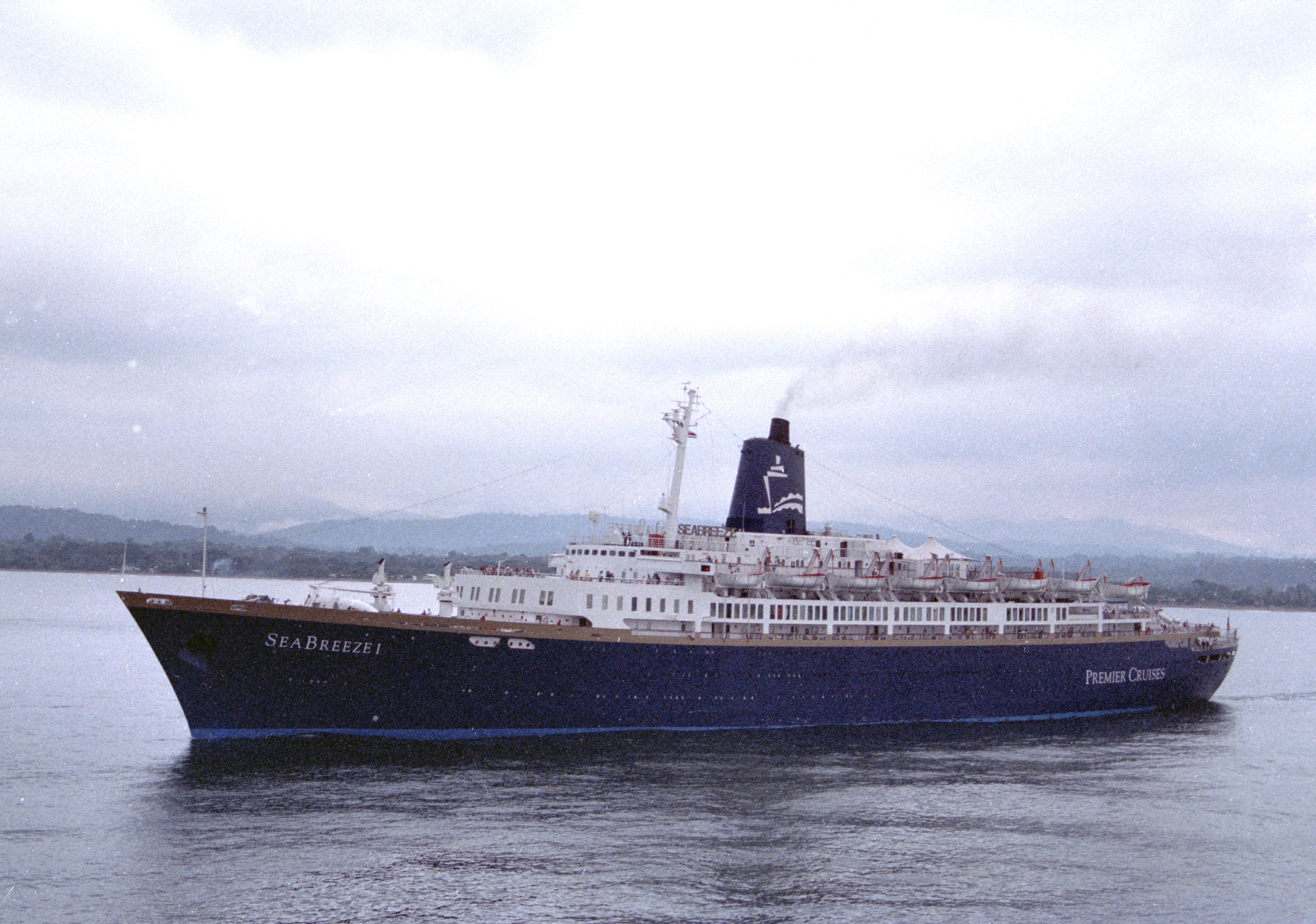
S.S SeaBreeze 1: 1997–2000 (Note: Acquired from Dolphin Cruise Line)

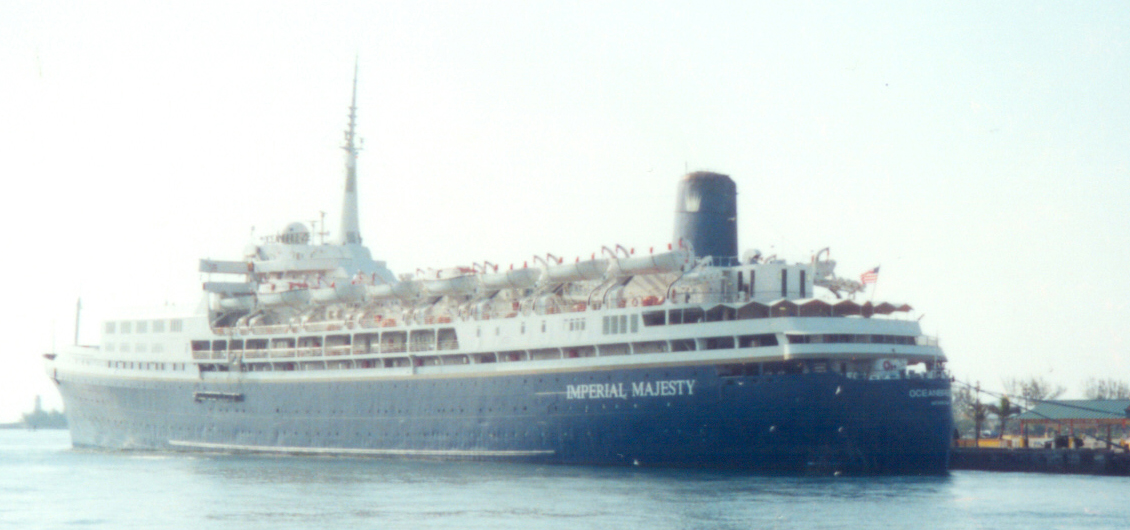
S.S OceanBreeze: 1997–1999 (Note: Acquired from Dolphin Cruise Line)

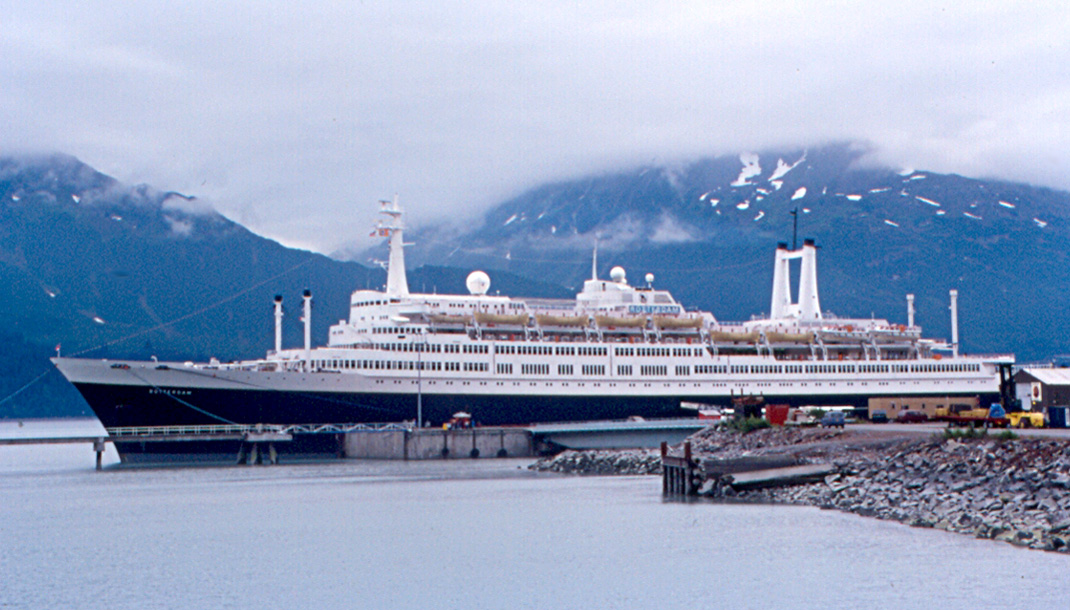
S.S Rembrandt: 1997–2000 (Note: The ship in 1997 was planned to be renamed "The Big Red Boat IV" but they decided to call it "Rembrandt" because it was a Classic ship since it has been present since 1959, and they left the painting of Holland America only adding a small yellow line to the logos of "Premier Cruises" and the big name of "Rembrandt", Previously known as Holland America Line's flagship the SS Rotterdam)

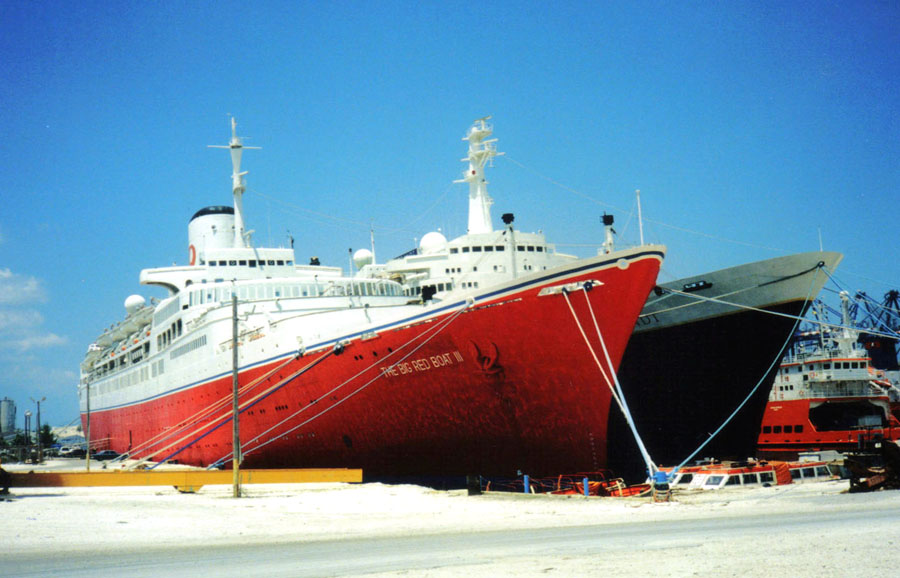
T.S.S IslandBreeze: 1998, The Big Red Boat III: 1998–2000 (Note: Acquired from Thomson Cruises)

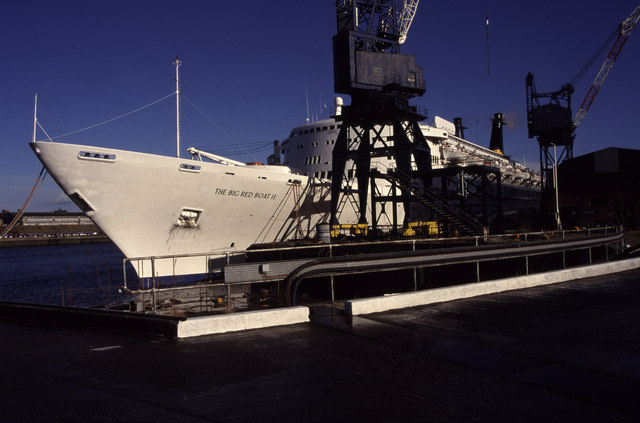
S.S The Big Red Boat II: 2000–2000 (Note: Acquired from Direct Cruises)

=== Canceled ===
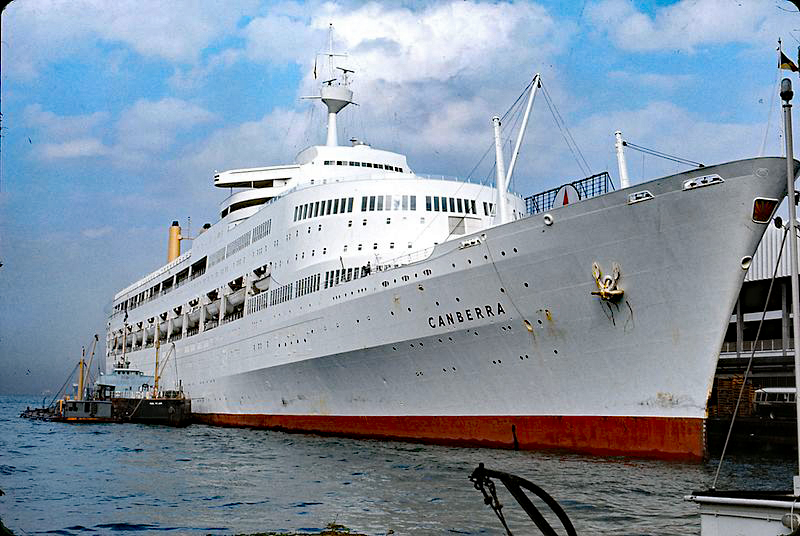
S.S Canberra "Rembrandt or The Big Red Boat IV": 1997 (Note: Premier Cruises wanted to buy the S.S Canberra because it was a very good ship and P&O Cruises was putting it up for sale, Premier Cruises planned to rename it the S.S Canberra as "Rembrandt" or "The Big Red Boat IV", Premier Cruises would sadly not be able to acquire the S.S Canberra and P&O Cruises had already made an agreement for it to be scrapped, Al Premier Cruises as a Second option would buy the S.S Rotterdam from Holland America Line since it had the same chimneys as S.S Canberra and it would also be a good ship but not reaching the level of Canberra)

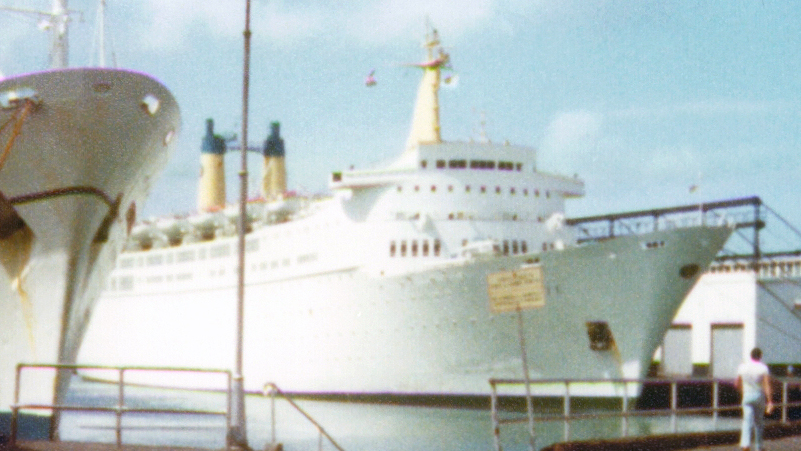
S.S Sun Venture? (As S.S Doric): 1997 (Note: Premier Cruises planned to buy the S.S Sun Venture from Royal Venture Cruise Line, but Premier Cruises would not buy it in the end because of the bad condition it was in)

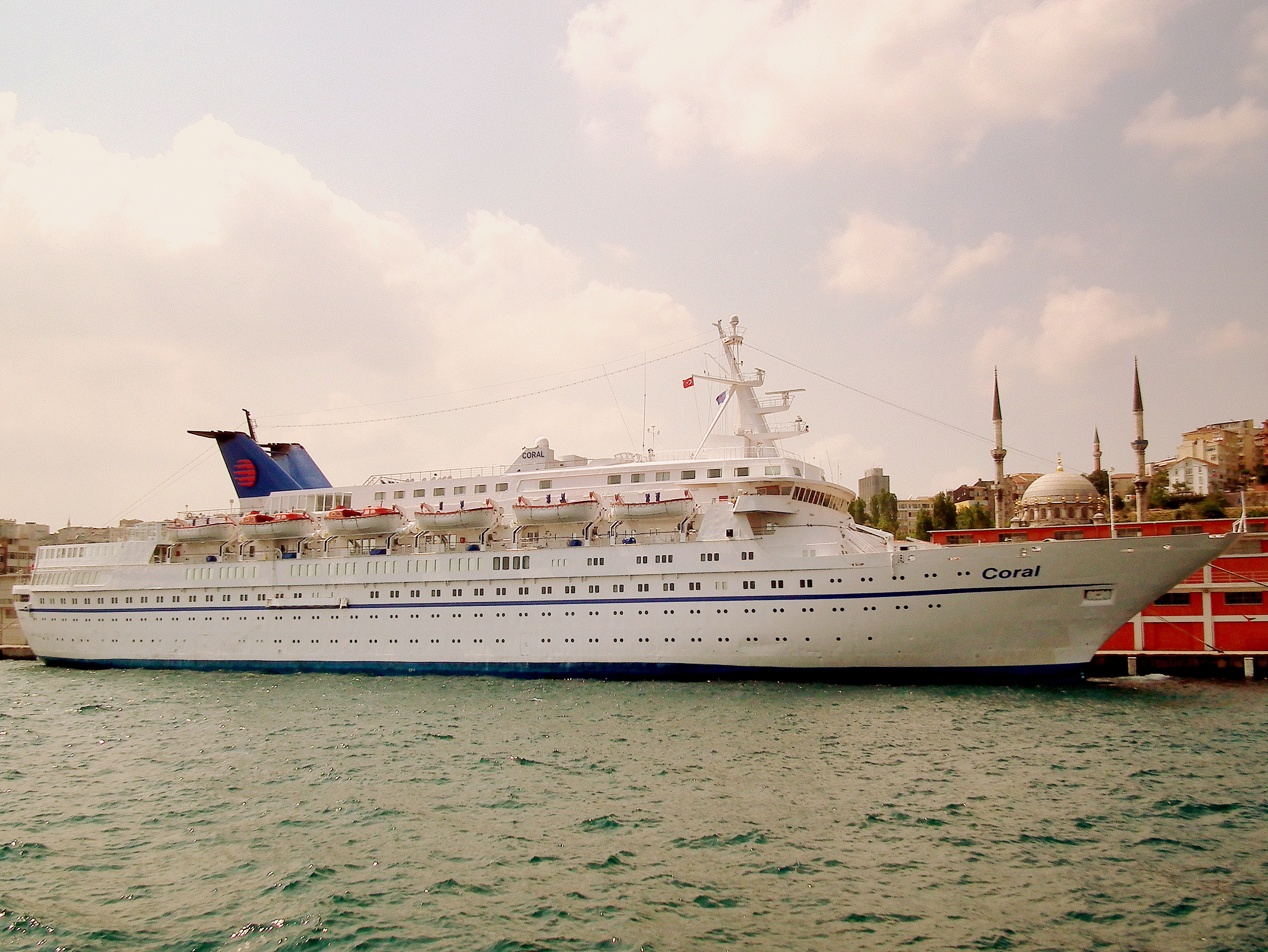
M.T.S Triton (As M.S Coral): 1998 (Note: It would never enter into service with Premier Cruises for unknown reasons, but Premier Cruises had already created advertising by announcing it)

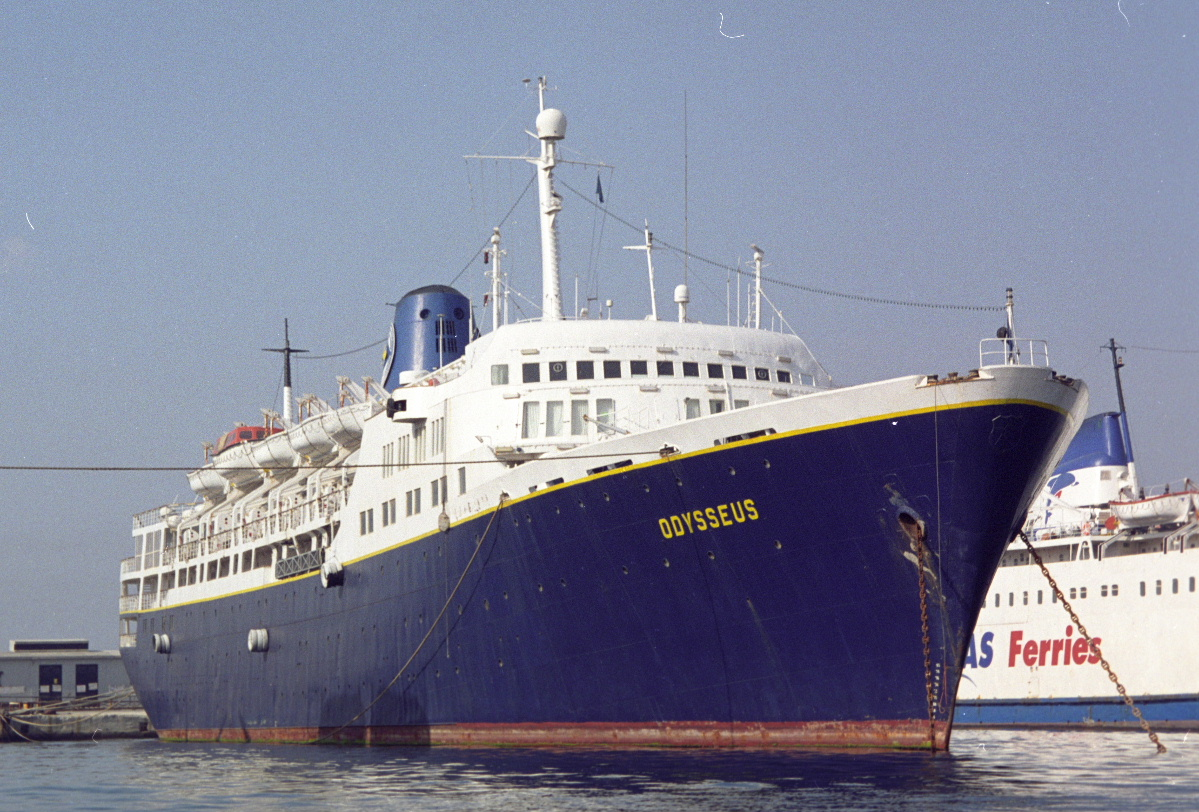
S.S Odysseus: 1998 (Note: For some reason it didn't enter into operations with Premier Cruises, but the same Premier Cruises had already made advertising announcing the ship)
