= Maria Amapola Cabase =

Filipina singer, actress, musician, television and radio host

Amapola
- Also known as: “Total Performer” "Queen of Hearts"
- Born: Maria Amapola Cabase; November 3, 1948 (age 77); Sibonga, Cebu, Philippines
- Genres: OPM; pop; Broadway; jazz
- Occupations: Cruise ship headliner; cabaret show singer; songwriter; film actress; record producer; TV host; Mrs. Marcos music ambassador 1973
- Instruments: Vocals; various instruments
- Years active: 1953–present
- Labels: Pioneer Records (1972–1978); WEA (1981–1991); Infinity Productions (1994–present)
- Website: theamapola.com

Maria Amapola Cabase (born November 3, 1947), known mononymously as Amapola, is a Filipino singer, songwriter, actress, television and radio host. She is widely known in the Philippines as the original artist for the song "Kapantay ay Langit", which was later popularized by Pilita Corrales. Philippine First Lady Imelda Marcos dubbed Cabase as a "Music Ambassador" for the country in 1973 in celebration of Amapola's first concert in New York, November 3, 1973, at New York's Town Hall. In 1984, she released her international debut album produced in collaboration with jazz pianist Bobby Enriquez, who led the Cal Tjader Trio for Amapola's debut jazz album, Sophisticated Lady.

== Music career ==
Amapola's music career began when she sang the love theme "Guihigugma Ko Ikaw" for the Azucena Pictures film Utlanan. The song "Kapantay Ay Langit" sung by Amapola and composed by George Canseco, won the Manila Film Festival "Gabi Ng Parangal" (Filipino Academy of Movie Arts and Sciences Award) song of the year award. It was later popularized by singer Pilita Corrales, which eventually became her signature song. Amapola was awarded the key to Cebu City by then-Governor Manuel Cuenco to celebrate her work as Toy Orchestra Conductor, making her the youngest person ever to receive the honor. The event was held at Cebu City's DYRC-Radio, attended by Cebu Normal School (now Cebu Normal University) Military Toy Orchestra, conductor Amapola and director Coronada Pingol, the CNS Toy Orchestra creator.

Since the 1970s, Amapola has performed jazz and popular music. She has headlined in venues such as the Sahara Hotel and the Union Plaza Hotel in Las Vegas, Stern Grove in San Francisco, The Town Hall in New York, the Grand Hotel in Washington DC, and the Shrine Auditorium in Los Angeles. In 1979, Amapola's band, Amy and the Sounds, featuring her father, Mahnee Cabase on the keyboards, were commissioned as the house band at the Fairmont Hotel in San Francisco.

In the 1980s, Amapola won several awards for her music, including the Awit Award for Best Female Singer and Best Vocal Performance. In 1984, she was inducted into the Tinig Awards Hall of Fame for her contributions to the Filipino entertainment industry in the Philippines and abroad, appearing in numerous local presentations in California for the Filipino community.

=== Songs and Amapola ===
Amapola's first compilation album, Songs and Amapola, was released under the Pioneer label of Vicor Music Corporation and included all of Amapola's 1971–72 hit songs. All tracks were written and performed by D'Amarillo and His Orchestra. The vocal coach was Philip Maninang. The album's back cover featured George Canseco's poem "Ode to Amapola".

== Discography ==
On November 13, 1971, Billboard released news that Amapola had started her recording contract with Vicor Music Corporation. Formerly with D'Swan Records and winning her first Awit Awards as Best Female Singer in the Vernacular, Amapola signed on with Vicor to record her first two hit songs, "Secret Love" and "Never". The aforementioned songs anchored the gold hit Songs and Amapola under the Pioneer record label. Amapola held the title of Philippine Jukebox Queen in the early 1970s.

=== Albums and compilations ===
- 1972: Songs and Amapola
- 1982: Live, at the Manila Hotel
- 1984: Mahnee Cabase Compositions
- 1988: Sophisticated Lady
- 2004: Broadway, My Way
- 2005: Coming Home (piano solos)
- 2008: By Choice
- 2008: You Don't Know Me
- 2010: Merry Christmas, Darling

=== Hit songs ===
- 1970: "Kapantay Ay Langit"
- 1971: "Secret Love"
- 1971: "Never"
- 1971: "Sinner or Saint"
- 1971: "Little Things Mean a Lot"
- 1971: "I'll Walk Alone"
- 1971: "One Love"
- 1971: "Hideaway"
- 1971: "Loss of Love"
- 1971: "Songs" (by George Canseco)
- 1971: "Face to Face"
- 1972: "Story of a Starry Night"
- 1972: "Ah-Choo"
- 1972: "Forbidden Games"
- 1973: "Speak Softly Love"

== Television, film, and writing ==
Amapola hosted the Amapola Presents Show, a weekly TV variety show on KEMO-TV (now KOFY) in San Francisco, which she hosted from 1978 to 1981. She regularly performed on Manila television shows such as Stop, Look, Listen (as one of the weekly hosts), Eat Bulaga!, Superstar, Seeing Stars, Etchos Lang and Live with Pops and Martin throughout the 1980s.

Amapola was discovered by Espiridion Laxa who signed her up with Tagalog Ilang-Ilang Productions for three films. She co-starred with Victor Wood in Mr. Lonely in 1972 and You Are My Destiny in 1973. Both films were directed by Leonardo L. Garcia and written by Rico Bello Omagap. Casting for the third film I Went to Your Wedding was changed when Amapola began her United States tour in Honolulu, Hawaii.

In 2003, Amapola published Coming Home, her first novel. Coming Home won the Florida Writers Association's Royal Palm Literary Award for 'Romantic Fiction' and was a finalist for 'Best Fiction' of 2004 in Foreword Magazine. In 2005, she published Promising Skies, which received critical acclaim from New York Times best-selling author Ellen Tanner Marsh.

== Cruise ship headlining ==
From 1986 to 1990, Amapola headlined onboard all ships of the Royal Viking Line: Royal Viking Sky, Royal Viking Star, Royal Viking Sea and Royal Viking Sun, and sang with the Glenn Miller Orchestra, the Nelson Riddle Orchestra, Bob Crosby and the Bobcats and the Mitch Kerper Orchestra. In 1990, Amapola played the role of Bloody Mary in the RVL Sun's Theater production of South Pacific (musical). From 1990 to 1994, Amapola sang on board the Song of Flower of the Seven Seas Cruises and Hapag Lloyd's Hanseatic explorer ship that cruised South America and alternated with the Arctic and the Antarctic. On board the Hanseatic, Amapola was offered to sing on board the MS Gripsholm. In 2006, Amapola was invited to headline on board Regent Seven Seas Cruises Voyager World Cruise. Cruise Travel Magazine voted Amapola as their favorite performer onboard Radisson's Seven Seas Cruise ship Song of Flower.

== Personal life ==
Amapola raised two children with her second husband, Nicolas T. Aiello. She later married Stephen Woodward, who was diagnosed with Parkinson's disease in 1989. The two became active in the search for a Parkinson's disease cure, until Woodward's death in 2016.

== Honors and legacy ==
- Awit Awards, Best Female Singer in the Philippines (won)
- NPC Lifetime Achievement Award, National Press Club, Philippines (merit)
- San Francisco Cultural Society, San Francisco Cultural Award (won)
- Bay Area "Eye" Awards, Entertainer of the Year (won)

Amapola has been inducted into the Awit Awards Hall of Fame and the Tinig Awards Hall of Fame.

Year	Award giving body	Category	Nominated work	Results
1971	Awit Awards	Best Female Singer (Vernacular)	—N/a	Won
