= Royal Viking Line =

Former Norwegian luxury cruise line

- Company type: Luxury Cruise Line
- Industry: Travel & Tourism
- Founded: 1971
- Defunct: 1998
- Headquarters: One Embarcadero Center San Francisco, California, United States
- Key people: Warren Titus; Torstein Hagen
- Products: Cruises
- Parent: Kloster 1986–1994; Cunard Line 1994–1998

The Royal Viking Line was a luxury cruise line that operated from 1972 until 1998. The company was the brainchild of Warren Titus and had its headquarters at One Embarcadero Center in San Francisco, California.

== History ==
=== The First Ships ===
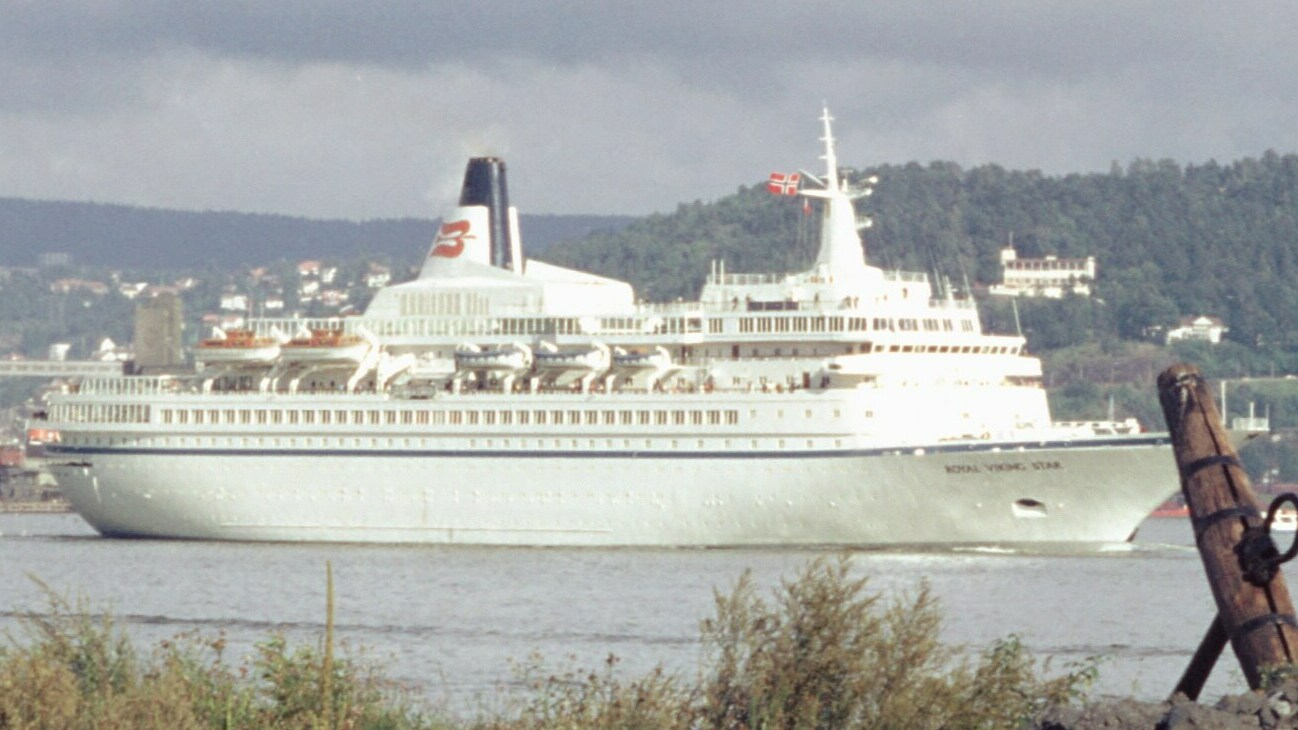
Royal Viking Star, first ship of the line in original configuration

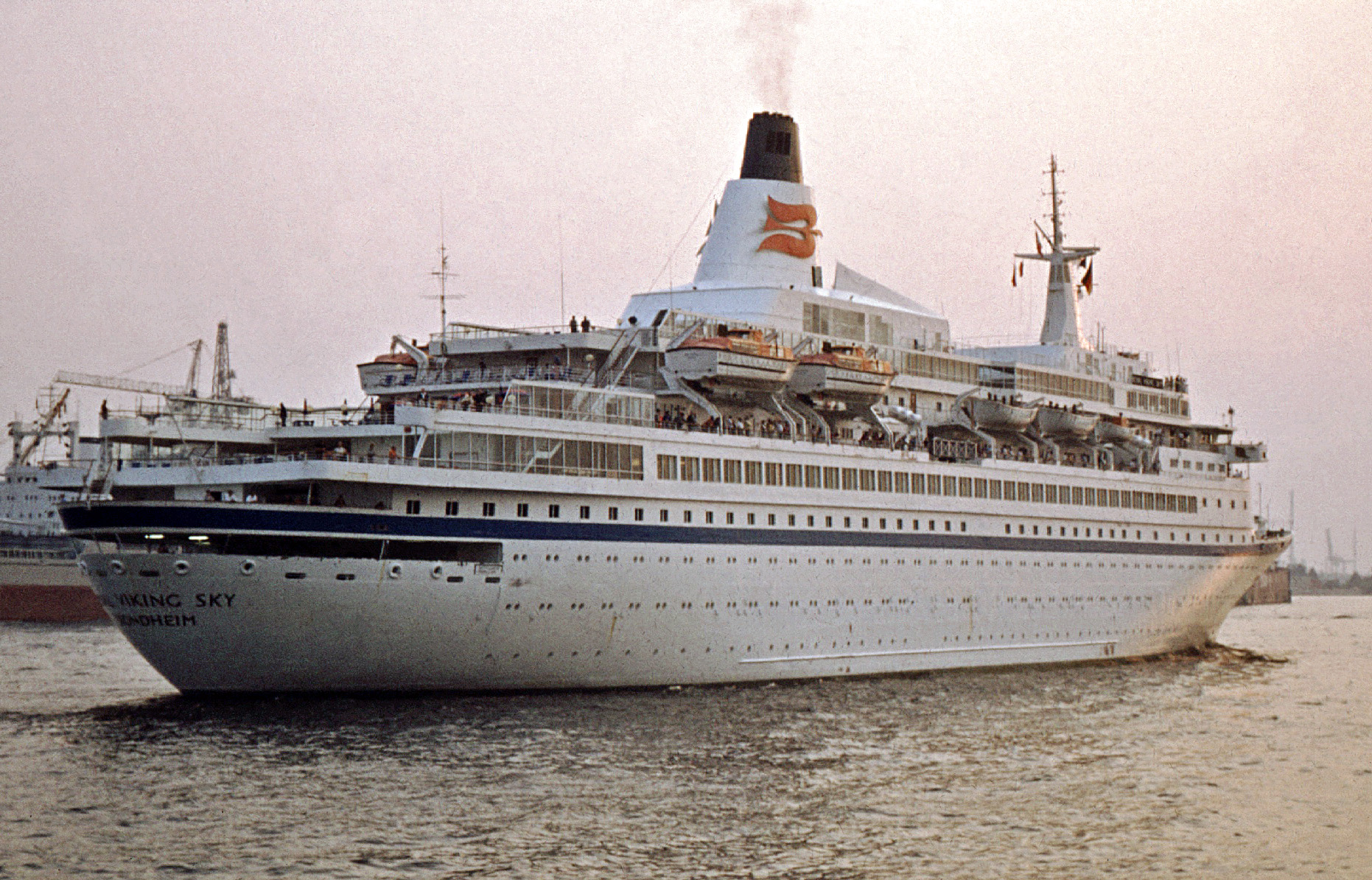
Royal Viking Sky

Each of the line's initial three vessels was owned by one of its initial investing partners. The first, Royal Viking Star, was completed in July, 1972. Its owner was Bergenske Dampskibsselskab (Bergen Line). The second, Royal Viking Sky, was owned by Nordenfjeldske Dampskibsselskab of Trondheim. She was completed in July 1973. The third ship, Royal Viking Sea, was ready in December of the same year. Her owner was A. F. Klaveness & Co, Oslo.

Warren S. Titus became the first president of Royal Viking Line, which established its United States head office in San Francisco.

The ships were all built by Wärtsilä Helsinki New Shipyard, Finland, and were each approximately 21,500 gross register tons (GRT) and nearly identical in appearance, with a tall superstructure and a single, scooped Queen Elizabeth 2-esque funnel. However, the Royal Viking Star was two feet (0.61 m) shorter (581 feet, 177 m), and her interior arrangement differed slightly from her two fleet-mates. Each ship featured a double-height theatre occupying an interior space on the two lowest passenger decks; however, on Royal Viking Star the space just forward of the theatre on the higher of these decks was occupied by a chapel, a feature not found on either of her fleet-mates nor any of the Scandinavian-built cruise ships of that generation. Other differences included the placement of small lounges and facilities such as the library.

These vessels were intended for longer voyages to exotic destinations, and a significant percentage of the line's passengers were wealthy retirees. As such, they featured numerous single staterooms and suites, and thus their capacity was only about 550 compared to 750–850 on similarly-sized ships of other lines. Royal Viking Line prided itself on single-seating dining, and the restaurant was situated unusually high in the ship, with large windows. Another popular feature was a glass-enclosed lounge high atop the bridge, which afforded excellent views. On May 1, 1976, Royal Viking Sky and Royal Viking Star became the first sister ships to transit the Panama Canal simultaneously in different directions, with Royal Viking Sky sailing westbound and Royal Viking Star eastbound.

=== Stretching and adding to the fleet ===
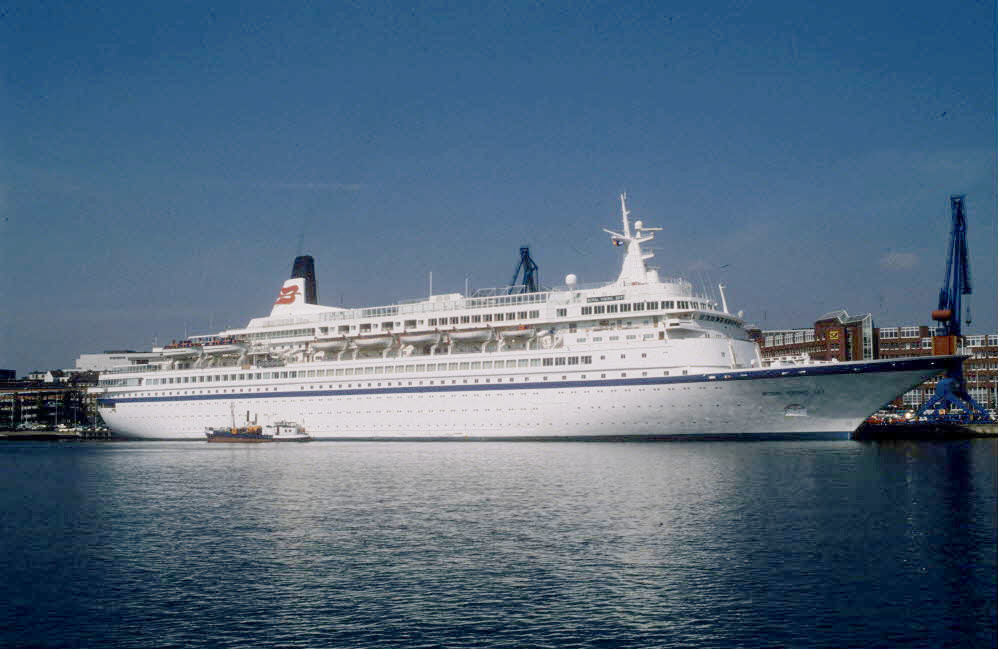
Royal Viking Sky after being stretched

Beginning in 1980, under the leadership of then CEO Torstein Hagen, each of the three ships was stretched to 28,000 GRT by adding a 93-foot (28 m) prefabricated midships section at the AG Weser shipyard in Bremerhaven. This increased each ship's capacity by 200 passengers and mainly included the addition of cabins. The size of the main restaurant was also doubled and now occupied nearly half of one deck in order to maintain single-seating dining. Royal Viking Star was stretched in 1981, followed by Royal Viking Sky in 1982 and Royal Viking Sea in 1983. The lengthening of the ships improved both their profiles and their economics. In 1984, Hagen arranged a $240 million management buyout of the company, with the assistance of venture capital firm JH Whitney. After the buyout had been announced, but before it closed, the two companies owning Royal Viking decided to sell the company instead to Norwegian Caribbean Line, then part of the Kloster group.

=== Sale to Kloster Group ===
The offices were moved to Coral Gables, Florida, and Warren Titus departed in 1987. While under Kloster ownership, Royal Viking built a fourth ship, Royal Viking Sun. Constructed by Wärtsilä in Turku, Finland, she was 38,848 GT and carried 850 passengers. The final ship built for Royal Viking was Royal Viking Queen completed in 1992. She was just 9,961 GT, carrying only 212 passengers and sharing a general arrangement with Seabourn Pride and Seabourn Spirit of Seabourn Cruise Line; the new home of Warren Titus.

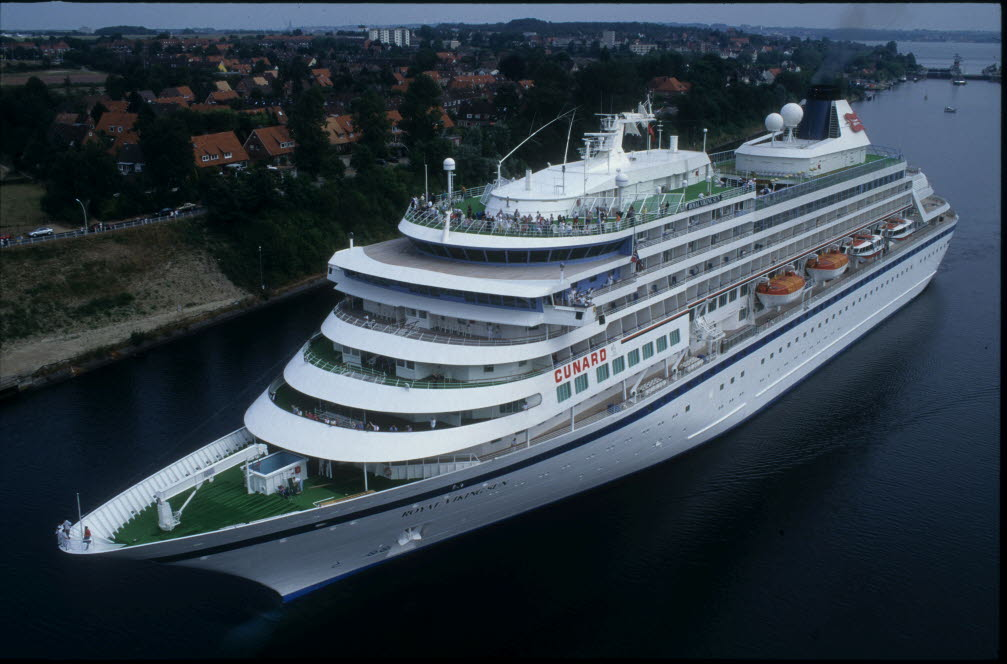
Royal Viking Sun sold to Cunard Line in 1994

In 1990 and 1991, Kloster moved Royal Viking Star and Royal Viking Sky to its Norwegian Cruise Line brand, where they became Westward and Sunward and Royal Viking Sea to its Royal Cruise Line brand, where she took the name Royal Odyssey.

In 1993, Westward became Star Odyssey for Royal Cruise Line. The passenger capacity on each of the original three ships had been increased to 850, mainly with the addition of staterooms amidships on the Bridge Deck, in what used to be officers' quarters. A buffet was also added in the lounge on the top deck, since the ships did not have the casual indoor/outdoor dining area (often called a Lido) that was becoming de rigueur. That same year, the Sunward was chartered to Princess Cruises which operated her for one year as Golden Princess.

=== End of Royal Viking ===
In 1994, when Kloster Cruise was in financial difficulties, the Royal Viking Line was dissolved. Royal Viking Queen was transferred to Royal Cruise Line as Queen Odyssey, while Royal Viking Sun and the Royal Viking brand were sold to Cunard Line Ltd. Cunard continued to operate the ship under the Royal Viking brand as a special segment of the Cunard fleet. Following acquisition by Carnival Corp and a merger with Seabourn Cruise Line, Cunard's Royal Viking and Sea Goddess fleets were consolidated with Seabourn, officially ending the use of the brand in 1999.

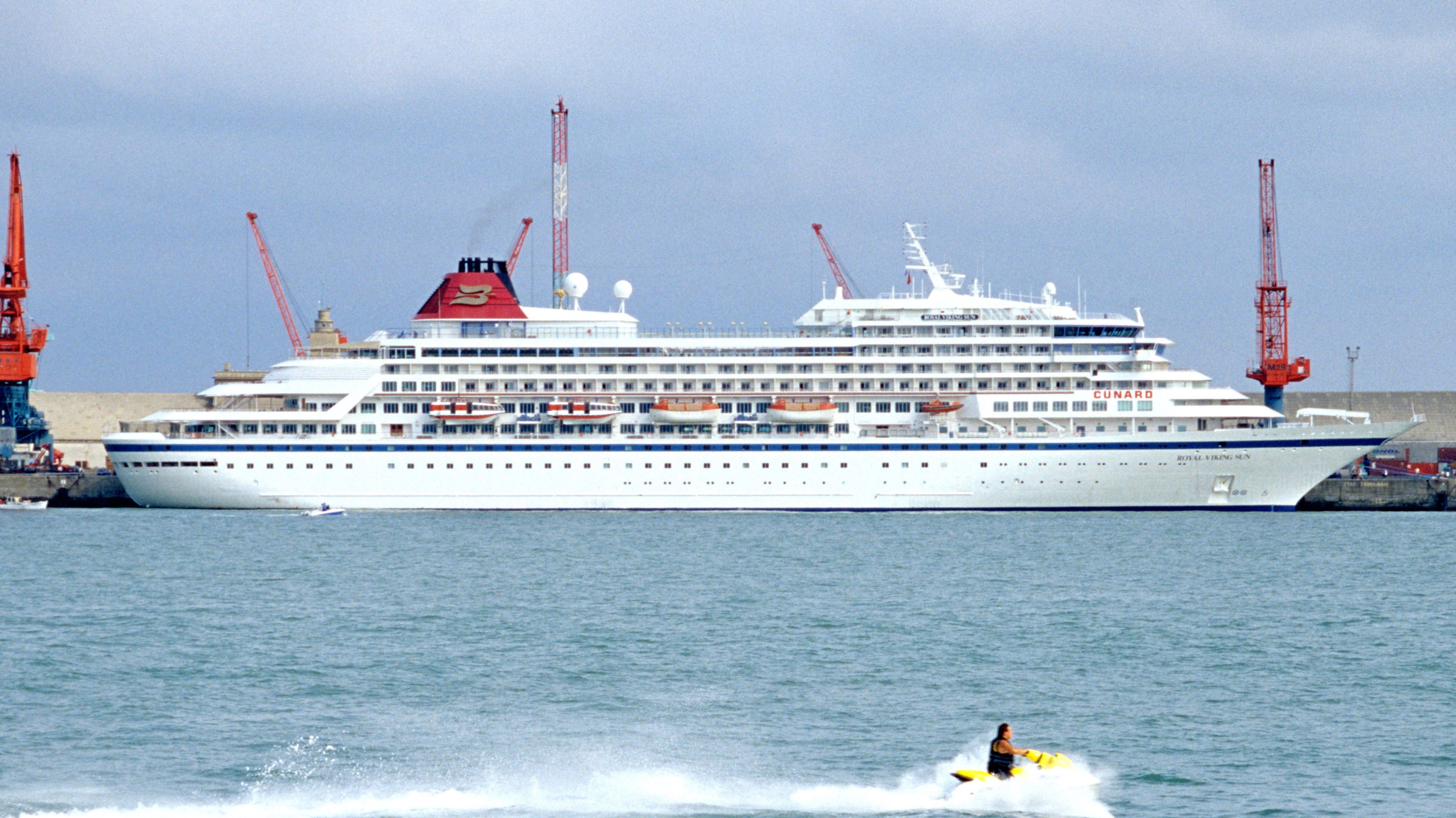
Royal Viking Sun in the final hybrid Royal Viking - Cunard livery

=== Status of the Royal Viking fleet ===
After several more changes of name and ownership, the former Royal Viking Star and Royal Viking Sky sailed with Fred. Olsen Cruise Lines, Royal Viking Star as Black Watch and Royal Viking Sky as Boudicca. Aboard both ships, the lounge/buffet on the top deck was replaced with additional passenger cabins, while the observation lounge above the bridge remained. The length of the Bridge Deck was occupied by passenger cabins (with the ship's officers scattered around the ship). Aboard Black Watch, the aft portion of the formerly vast main dining-room was converted to two smaller restaurants and an additional lounge. A spacious, glass-lined space on the top deck hosted the fitness center and spa. The former chapel was divided into three additional staterooms. The changes on Boudicca were even more radical, where the dining-room space was broken up into no fewer than four separate restaurants and the space formerly occupied by the theater converted into additional staterooms and a fitness center. In August 2020, Fred. Olsen retired Black Watch and Boudicca after 24 and 15 years respectively due to the COVID-19 pandemic and sold them as accommodation ships for workers in Tuzla, Istanbul. In May 2021 Boudicca was beached for scrapping in Aliağa, Turkey. Black Watch followed a year later in June 2022.

The former Royal Viking Sea sailed for the German company Phoenix Reisen as Albatros. Layout-wise, she changed the least, with the majority of public rooms remaining in their original configuration after the 1983 refit. In October 2020 Albatros was sold as a hotel vessel for the Pick Albatros Group in the Middle East, which operates some 15 hotels and resorts in Hurghada region. However, the project was never initiated, and the ship stayed at Hurghada until sold in 2021 for scrap, after a stop in Jeddah. She was beached at Alang, India on July 27, 2021.

Royal Viking Sun operated for Cunard Line with her original name until 1999, then she was renamed Seabourn Sun, as by this time, Seabourn had been acquired by Cunard's parent, Carnival, and merged into Cunard Line Ltd. This phase lasted until 2002, when she was transferred again to Holland America Line Inc. (another Carnival subsidiary), becoming the second Prinsendam, where she remained until 2019. In July 2018 Prinsendam was also bought by Phoenix Reisen. The ship was charted back to Holland America for one final year before transferring to Phoenix Reisen and being renamed Amera.

Royal Viking Queen operated briefly as Queen Odyssey for Royal Cruise Line, then joined her sister ships at Seabourn Cruise Line in 1996 as Seabourn Legend, after Kloster liquidated Royal Cruise Line. In 2015, Seabourn Legend was sold to Windstar Cruises and renamed Star Legend.

== Legacy ==
The Royal Viking line ships were featured prominently in the book Voyages of the Royal Viking by photographer and artist Harvey Lloyd. The book Ever Higher, The Birth of the Royal Viking Sun describes the line's history and construction of the line's fourth ship.

Although the last remnants of the original Royal Viking Line have long been phased out, a few former owners have tried to revive elements of the original line. This includes former Royal Viking CEO Torstein Hagen, who created Viking Ocean Cruises in 2013, with new ships based on a very similar design to the Royal Viking Sun with philosophy aligned with the original Royal Viking in service, amenities, and worldwide itineraries.

Kristian Stensby, former treasurer for Kloster Cruise Ltd., the parent of Norwegian Cruise Line, Royal Cruise Line and Royal Viking Line, and now CEO of Ocean Residences Development Group, is creating a new residential ship Njord, and has revived the original Royal Viking Line logo.

== Former fleet ==
Image	Ship	Built	In service for Royal Viking Line	Tonnage	Status
	Royal Viking Star	1971	1972–1991	21,847 GRT/ 28,221 GRT (after stretch)	Scrapped at Alang, India, in 2022
	Royal Viking Sky	1973	1973–1991	21,891 GRT/ 28,221 GRT (after stretch)	Scrapped at Aliağa, Turkey, in 2021
	Royal Viking Sea	1973	1973–1991	20,018 GRT/ 28,221 GRT (after stretch)	Scrapped at Alang, India, in 2021
	Royal Viking Sun	1988	1988–1999	38,848 GT	Amera for Phoenix Reisen since 2019
	Royal Viking Queen	1992	1992–1995	9,961 GT	Star Legend for Windstar Cruises since 2015
