= Royal Odyssey =

Royal Odyssey may refer to the following cruise ships:

- SS Royal Odyssey, in service with Royal Cruise Line 1981–1988
- MS Royal Odyssey, in service with Royal Cruise Line 1991–1997
