= MS Amadea =

Cruise ship built in 1991

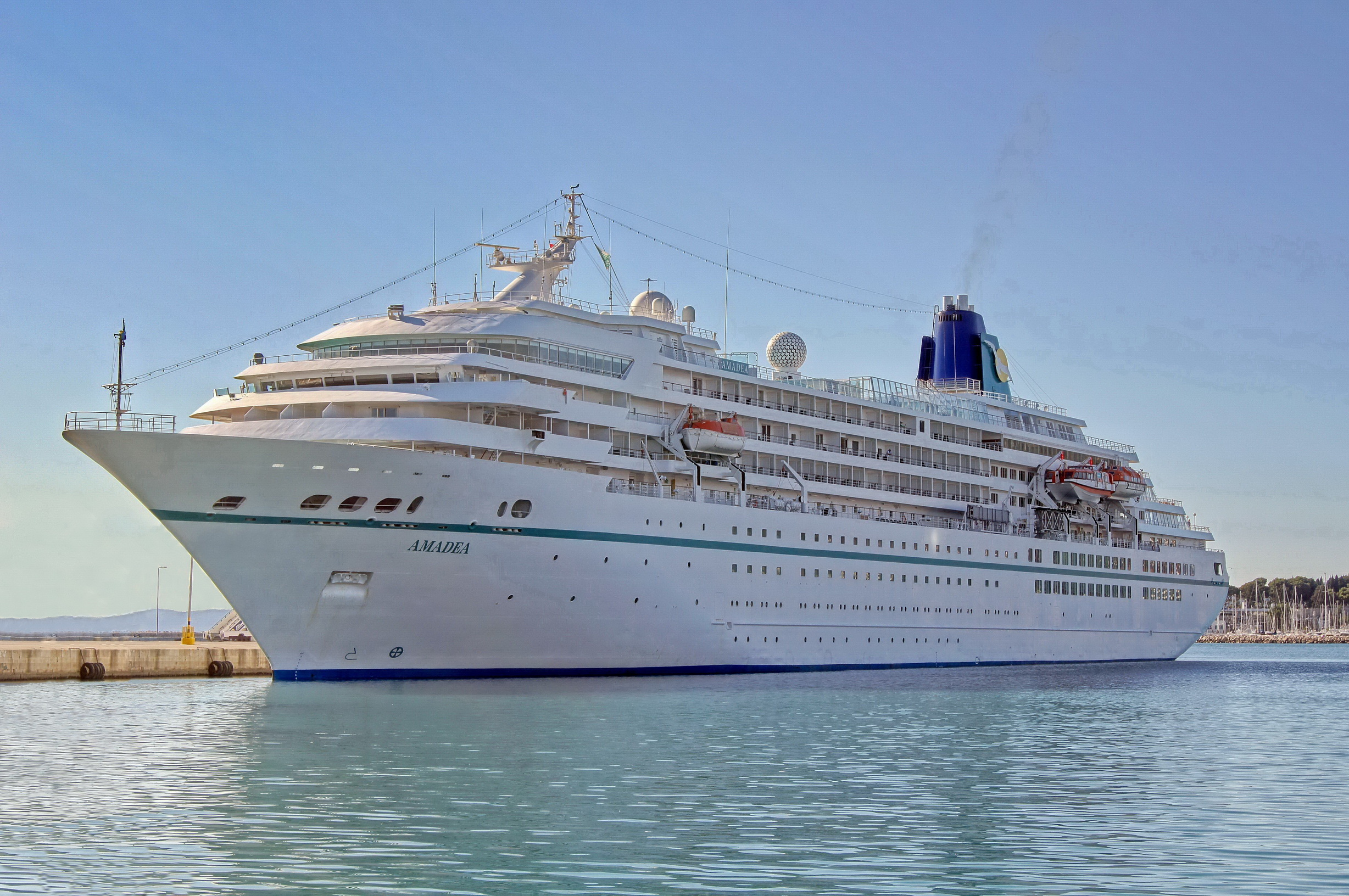
- Amadea in Split, Croatia on 11 November 2011

History
- Name: 1991–2006: Asuka; 2006 onwards: Amadea
- Owner: 1991–2006: Nippon Yusen Kaisha; 2006 onwards: Amadea Shipping Company
- Operator: 1991–2006: Nippon Yusen Kaisha; 2006 onwards: Phoenix Reisen
- Port of registry: 1991–2006: Tokyo, Japan; 2006 onwards: Nassau, Bahamas
- Builder: Mitsubishi Heavy Industries, Nagasaki, Japan
- Cost: $150 million
- Yard number: 2050
- Laid down: 16 April 1990
- Launched: 6 April 1991
- Completed: 23 October 1991
- Acquired: December 1991
- Maiden voyage: 24 December 1991
- In service: 24 December 1991
- Identification: Call sign: C6VE9; IMO number: 8913162; MMSI number: 308445000
- Status: In service

General characteristics
- Type: cruise ship
- Tonnage: 28,856 GT; 2,248 DWT
- Length: 192.82 m (632 ft 7 in)
- Beam: 24.70 m (81 ft 0 in)
- Draught: 6.20 m (20 ft 4 in)
- Installed power: 2 × MAN-Mitsubishi 7L58/64; 17,300 kW (combined)
- Propulsion: 2 propellers
- Speed: 21 knots (39 km/h; 24 mph)
- Capacity: 604 passengers (as Asuka); 624 passengers (as Amadea)
- Crew: 292

MS Amadea is a cruise ship owned by Amadea Shipping Company and operated under charter by the Germany-based Phoenix Reisen. She was originally built in 1991 by the Mitsubishi Heavy Industries shipyard in Nagasaki, Japan as MS Asuka for Nippon Yusen Kaisha. In 2006 she was replaced by the Asuka II and sold to her current owners and entered service with Phoenix Reisen. The ship is known as the setting for the German TV series Das Traumschiff which is also filmed on board.

== Cabins ==
The Amadea contains 2 royal suites, 40 suites, and 254 cabins. 106 cabins have a private balcony.

== Gallery ==
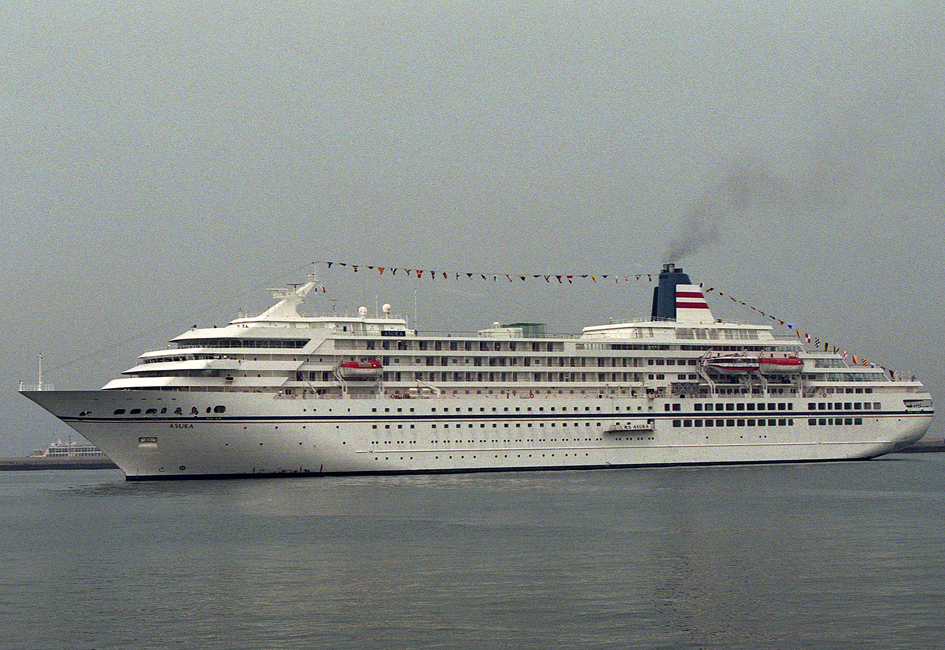
MS Asuka

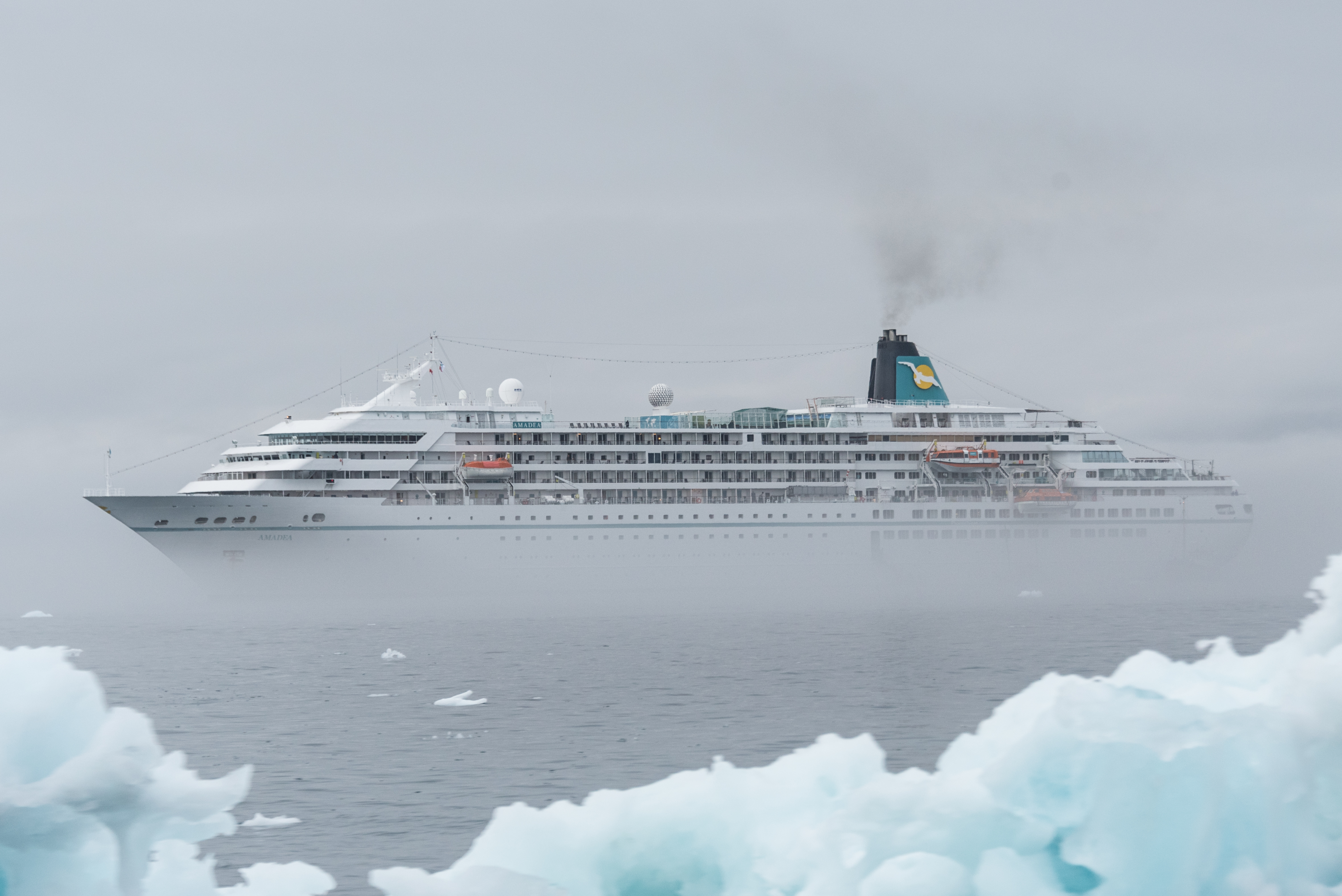
MS Amadea, off Ilulissat, Greenland 2017
