= Norwegian Capricorn Line =

The Norwegian Capricorn Line was a cruise line and was founded by some of Australia's foremost cruise professionals, (including Sarina Bratton who went on to found the expedition style cruise line Orion Expedition Cruises in 2004) in partnership with Norwegian Cruise Line.

The 1997 launch of Norwegian Capricorn Line brought something entirely new to the Asia-Pacific region -- a four star cruise ship based in Australia offering some 35 cruises throughout the year in the waters of Australia, New Zealand and the South Pacific.

NCL operated the vessel originally named Royal Viking Sea as the Norwegian Star on several affordable itineraries that included many Queensland ports of call.

When the major partner in Norwegian Capricorn Line, Norwegian Cruise Lines was taken over by Malaysian owned Star Cruises in 2000/2001 the Australian partnership was dissolved and the vessel Norwegian Star became part of Star Cruises fleet and Norwegian Capricorn Line ceased to exist.

The collapse of the company is the subject of the academic paper ’The Short, Unhappy Life of an Australia-Based Cruise Line’

== Fleet ==
The sole vessel in Norwegian Capricorn Line's fleet was the 206m, 28,000gt Norwegian Star. The Norwegian Star was originally built as the Royal Viking Line cruise ship Royal Viking Sea in 1973. Royal Viking Sea was transferred into the main Norwegian Cruise Line fleet in 1996 as Norwegian Star and in 1997/98 she was transferred to the then newly formed Norwegian Capricorn Line. With Norwegian Capricorn Line, the Norwegian Star carried a maximum of 800 passengers in 400 suites/staterooms. In 2001 she became part of the Star Cruises fleet.

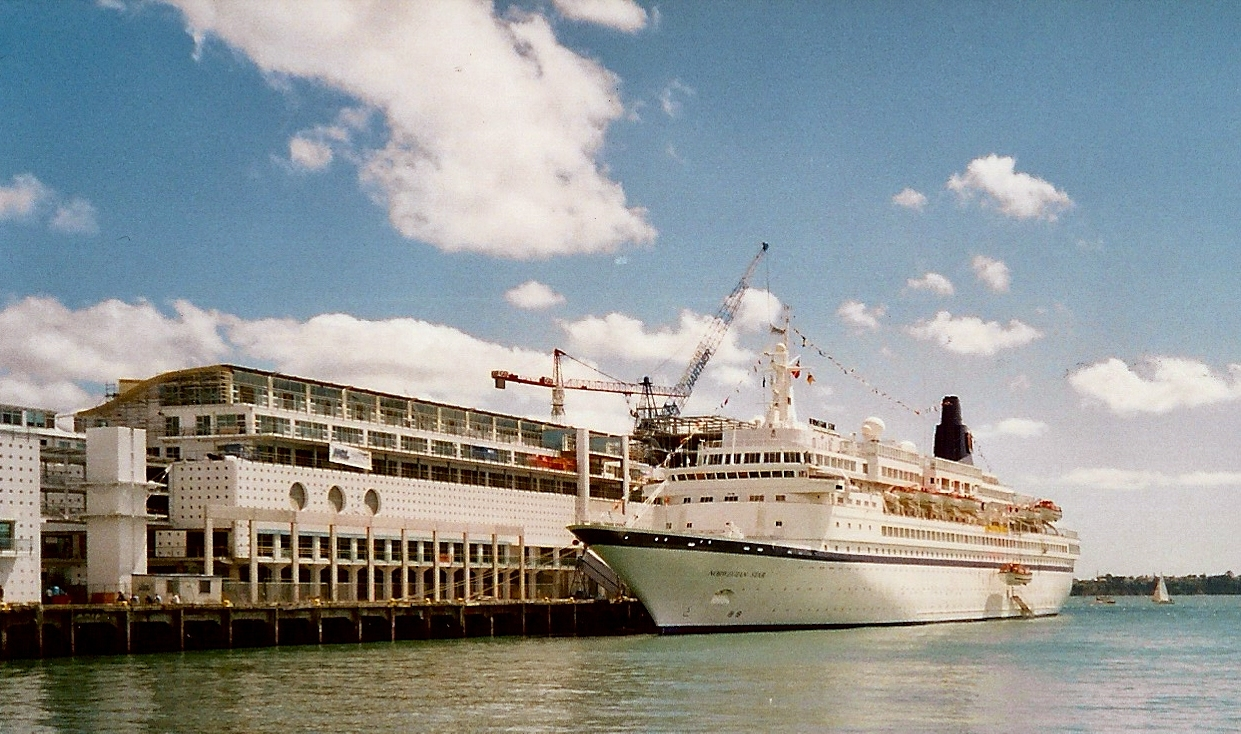
Norwegian Star

== See also ==
- List of cruise ships
- List of cruise lines
