= MV Boudicca =

Royal Viking Star-class cruise ship

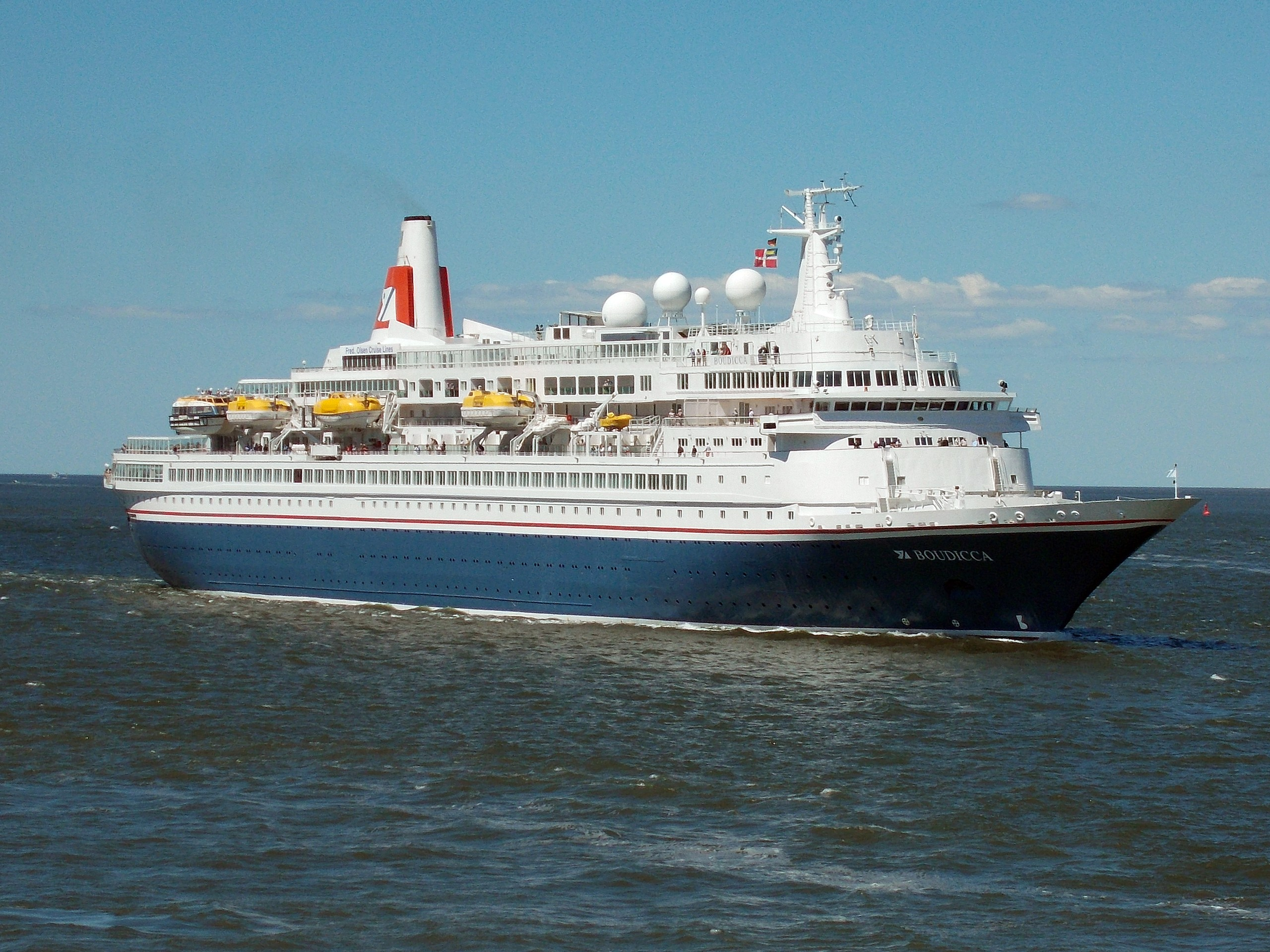
- Boudicca in 2018

History
- Name: 1973–1991: Royal Viking Sky; 1991–1992: Sunward; 1992: Birka Queen; 1992–1993: Sunward; 1993–1997: Golden Princess; 1997–1998: SuperStar Capricorn; 1998–2001: Hyundai Keumgang; 2001–2004: SuperStar Capricorn; 2004–2005: Grand Latino; 2005–2021: Boudicca; 2021: Edi
- Owner: 1973–1984 Nordenfjeldske Dampsibsselskap; 1984–1991: Kloster Cruise; 1991–1997: Birka Cruises; 1997–2004: Star Cruises; 2004–2005: Iberocruceros; 2005–2020: Fred. Olsen Cruise Lines; 2020–2021: Miray International; 2021: Plot B Sugurya
- Operator: 1973–1991: Royal Viking Line; 1991–1992: Norwegian Cruise Line; 1992–1992: Birka Cruises; 1992–1993: Norwegian Cruise Line; 1993–1997: Princess Cruises; 1997–1998: Star Cruises; 1998–2001: Hyundai Merchant Marine; 2001–2004: Star Cruises; 2004–2005: Iberocruceros; 2005–2020: Fred. Olsen Cruise Lines; 2020–2021: Miray International
- Port of registry: 1973–1987: Bergen, Norway; 1987–1992: Nassau, Bahamas; 1992–1992: Mariehamn, Finland; 1992–1997: Nassau, Bahamas; 1997–1998: Singapore, Singapore; 1997–2005: Panama City, Panama; 2005–2020: Nassau, Bahamas
- Builder: Wärtsilä Helsinki Shipyard, Helsinki, Finland
- Cost: $22.5 million
- Yard number: 396
- Launched: 25 May 1972
- Christened: Mrs Vesla Darre Hirsch
- Acquired: 5 June 1973
- Identification: Call sign: C6VA3; IMO number: 7218395; MMSI number: 309964000
- Fate: Scrapped 2021

General characteristics (as built in 1973)
- Class & type: Royal Viking Star-class cruise ship
- Tonnage: 21,891 GRT; 3,595 DWT
- Length: 177.70 m (583 ft 0 in)
- Beam: 25.19 m (82 ft 8 in)
- Draught: 7.00 m (23 ft 0 in)
- Installed power: 4 × Wärtsilä-Sulzer 9ZH40/48; 13,240 kW (combined)
- Propulsion: 2 propellers
- Speed: 21.5 knots (39.8 km/h; 24.7 mph)
- Capacity: 536 passengers
- Crew: 324

General characteristics (as rebuilt, 2005)
- Class & type: Royal Viking Star-class cruise ship
- Tonnage: 28,372 GT; 5,956 DWT
- Length: 206.96 m (679.0 ft)
- Beam: 25.22 m (82 ft 9 in)
- Draught: 7.55 m (24 ft 9 in)
- Depth: 13.67 m (44 ft 10 in)
- Decks: 8 (passenger accessible)
- Installed power: 4 × MAN 7L32/40; 14,000 kW (combined)
- Speed: 22 knots (41 km/h; 25 mph)
- Capacity: 900 passengers
- Crew: 320
- Notes: Otherwise the same as built

MV Boudicca (also known as Royal Viking Sky, Sunward, Birka Queen, Golden Princess, SuperStar Capricorn, Hyundai Keumgang, and Grand Latino) was a Royal Viking Star-class cruise ship that last served as accommodation vessel at Pendik, near Tuzla Shipyard. She was built in 1973 by Wärtsilä Helsinki Shipyard, Finland as Royal Viking Sky for Nordenfjeldske Dampskibsselskap, Trondheim, which placed the ship in Royal Viking Line service. In May 2021 the ship was beached in Aliağa, Turkey, for scrapping.

== Concept and construction ==
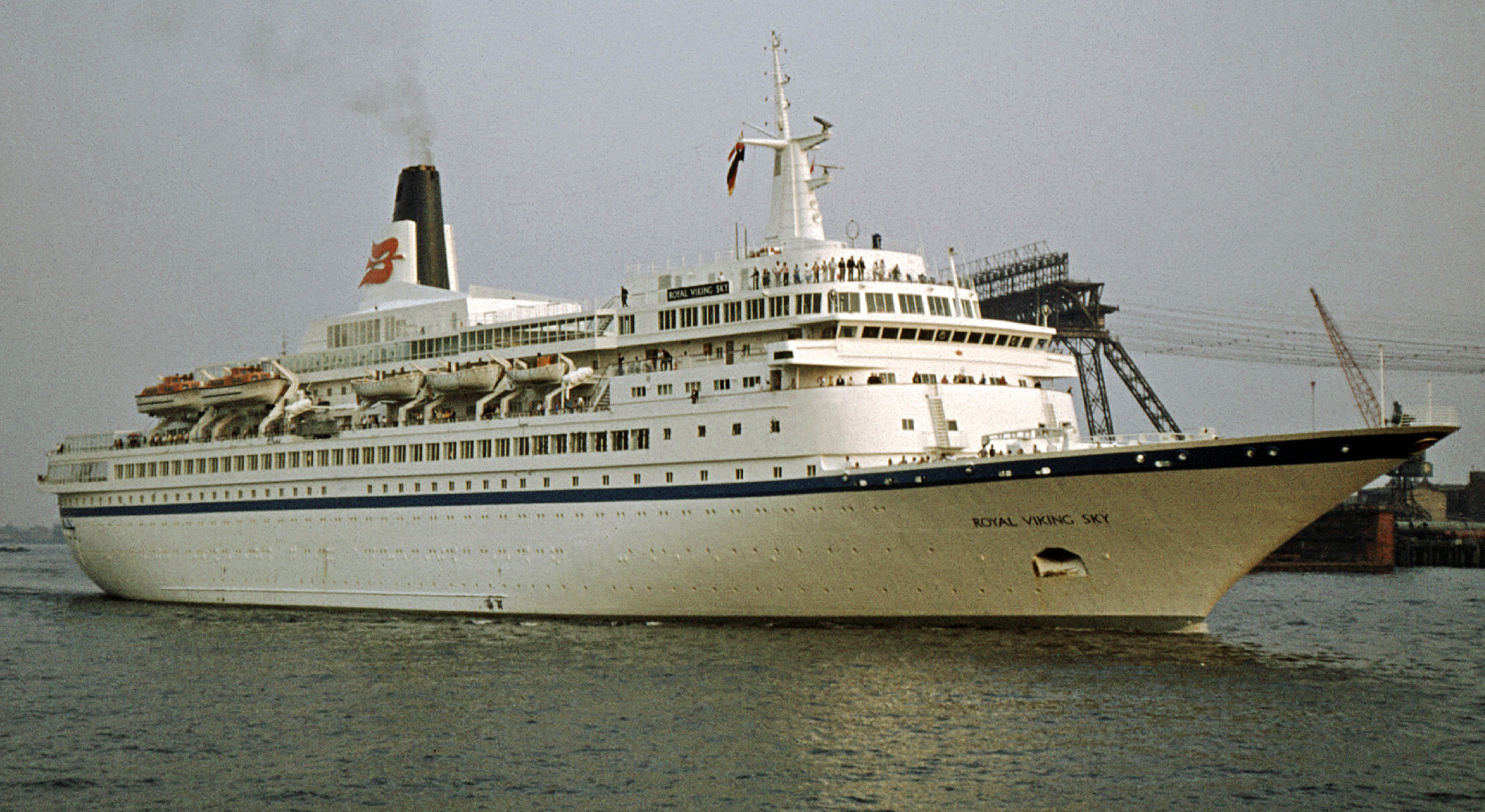
Royal Viking Sky in Hamburg, West Germany in 1978

Royal Viking Sky was ordered by Nordenfjeldske Dampskibsselskap, Trondheim from the Wärtsilä Hietalahti shipyard in Helsinki, Finland. She was one of three near-identical ships ordered by different companies for Royal Viking Line service.

Her sister ships were Royal Viking Star, owned by Bergenske Dampskibsselskap, Bergen, and Royal Viking Sea, owned by A. F. Klaveness & Co, Oslo. The Royal Viking Sky was launched from drydock on 25 May 1972 and delivered to her owners on 5 June 1973.

== Service history ==
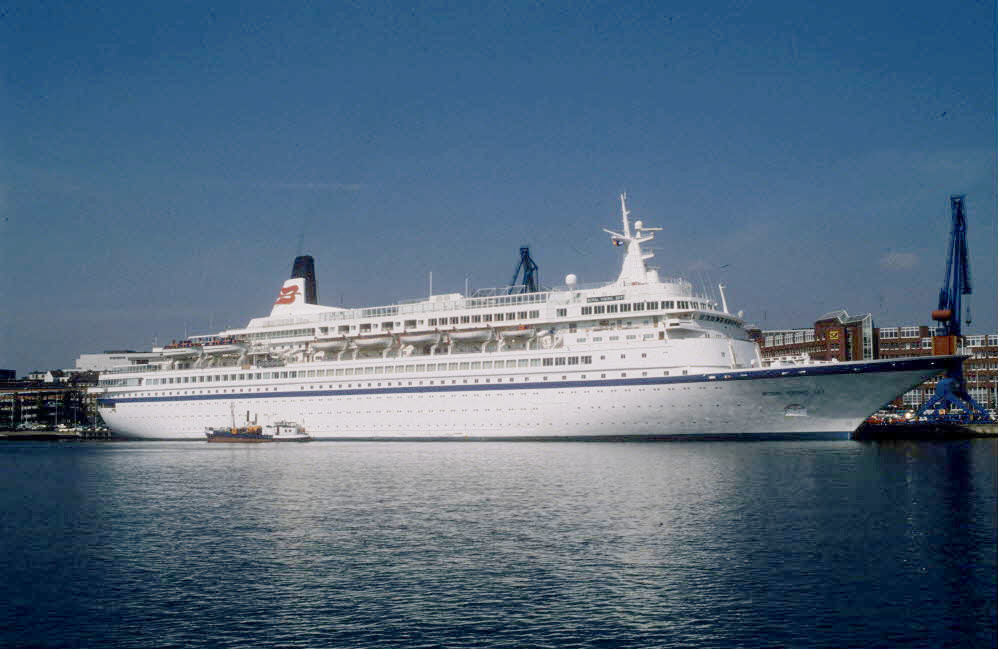
Royal Viking Sky in Kiel, Germany in 1990, after lengthening in 1982

Following delivery to Royal Viking, Royal Viking Sky was used for luxury cruises around the world. In 1982 she was lengthened from 177.70 metres (583 ft) to 205.47 metres (674 ft 1 in) at the A.G. Weser shipyard in Bremerhaven, West Germany. In 1984 Kloster Cruise acquired the entirety of Royal Viking Line. Subsequently, in 1991 Royal Viking Sky was transferred to the fleet of Norwegian Cruise Line (also owned by Kloster) under the name Sunward. In 1992 Sunward was sold to Birka Cruise, who renamed the ship Birka Queen for Baltic Sea cruising. Her career with Birka only lasted for the 1992 Northern Hemisphere summer season, and in late 1992 was chartered back to NCL, reverting to the name Sunward.

In 1993 the ship was chartered to Princess Cruises, becoming Golden Princess. Following the delivery of newer tonnage to Princess Cruises, the company terminated the charter of Golden Princess. Subsequently, Birka Cruises sold the ship to Star Cruises, who renamed her SuperStar Capricorn.

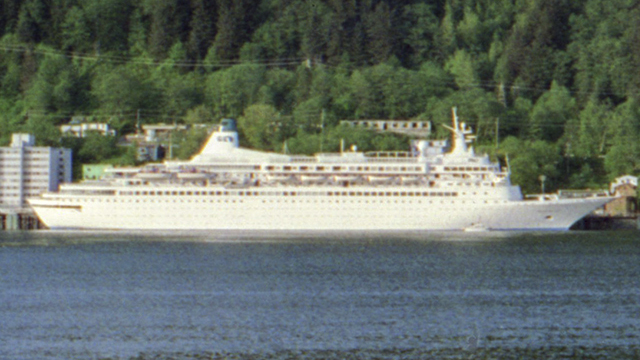
As the Golden Princess in Alaska

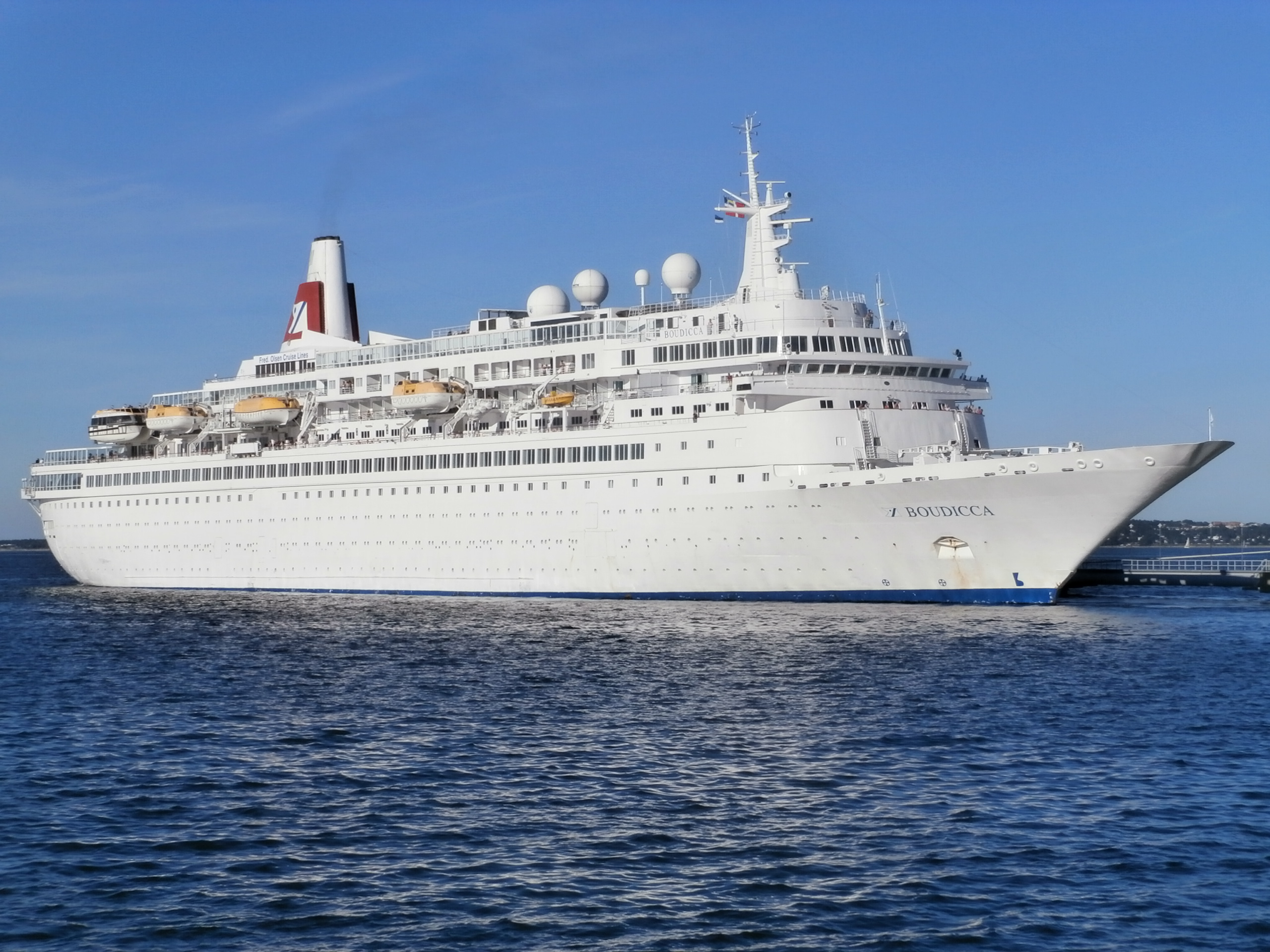
Boudicca in Tallinn, Estonia in 2013

In 1998 SuperStar Capricorn was chartered by Star Cruises to Hyundai Merchant Marine, who renamed the ship Hyundai Keumgang for cruises from South Korea to North Korea. Hyundai's cruise operations failed in 2001, and Hyundai Keumgang was returned to Star Cruises and resumed service under the name SuperStar Capricorn. In 2004 the ship was sold to Iberocruceros, who renamed her Grand Latino for Mediterranean cruising out of Spain. In 2005 the ship was sold to Fred. Olsen Cruise Lines and renamed Boudicca. Following changing of her main engines at the Blohm + Voss shipyard in Hamburg, Germany, the ship entered service with Fred. Olsen in February 2006.

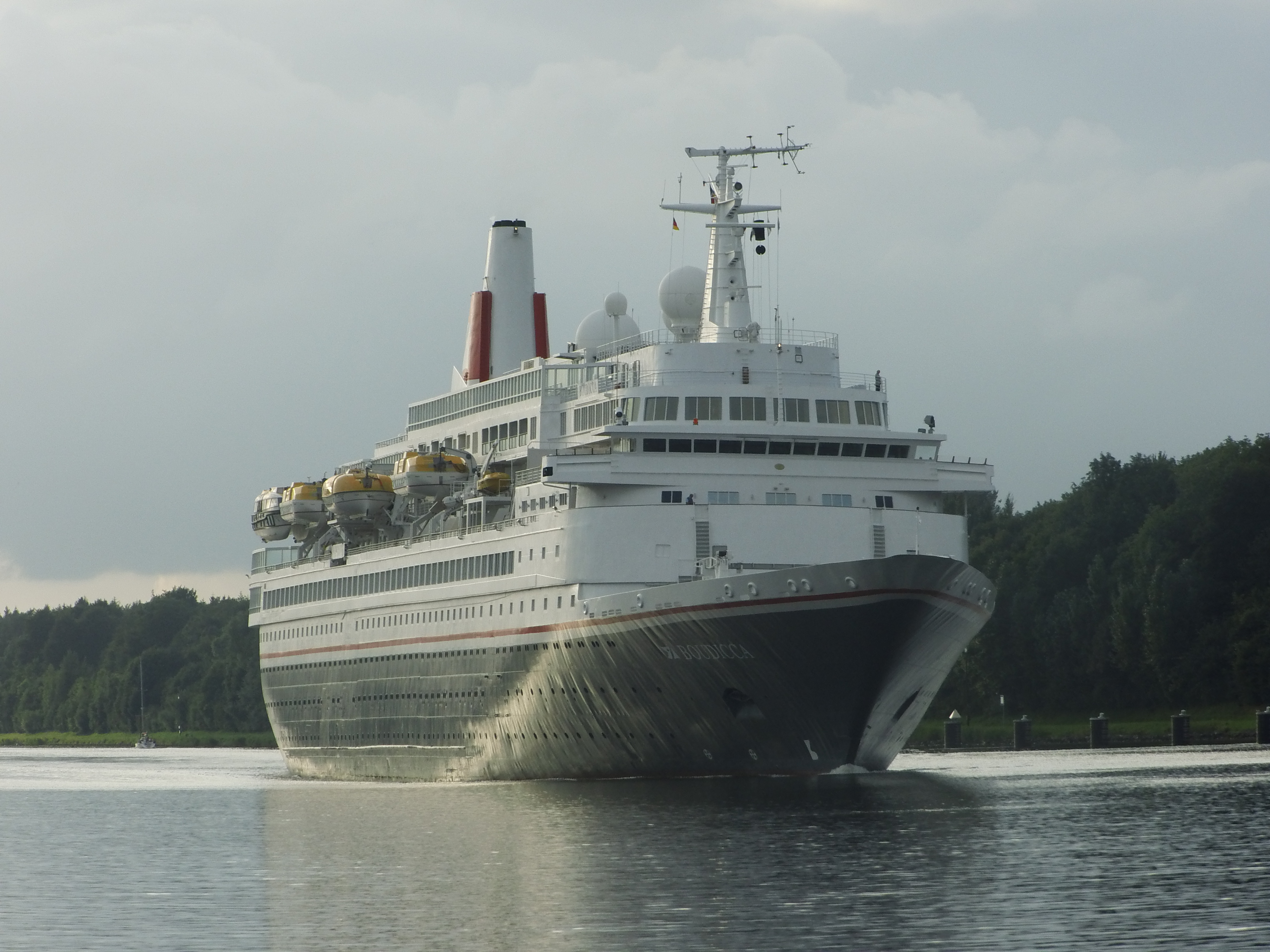
Boudicca in 2016

In March 2010, the ship was relocated to its new base in Liverpool, England, where it has replaced MV Black Prince, which was also owned by Fred. Olsen Cruise Lines.

On 25 January 2015, the ship carrying more than 1,000 people was left without power off Morocco after an engine room fire. The fire at 04:00 BST left the ship "listing" and "in pitch black", said Dave Tonkin, whose father was on board. Fred Olsen, the company which owned the ship, said it was fully stable and had five engines running again.

In March 2018, Boudicca underwent significant renovation at the Blohm + Voss shipyard in Hamburg, Germany.

In October 2019, Boudicca became the first passenger ship to dock at new facilities at Walvis Bay, Namibia after a decade of re-development. Two tugboats from the Namibian Port Authority celebrated the occasion by firing water cannons and officials handed out gifts to visiting passengers.

On 21 August 2020, Fred. Olsen announced that the Black Watch and her sister ship Boudicca were sold as accommodation ships at Tuzla, Istanbul for shipyard workers.

In April 2021, her new owner resold her for scrap. On 17 May 2021 the ship was beached in Aliağa for scrapping. She started to be dismantled on 10 July 2021.
