= Rochdale One =

Former cruise ship, wrecked in 2013

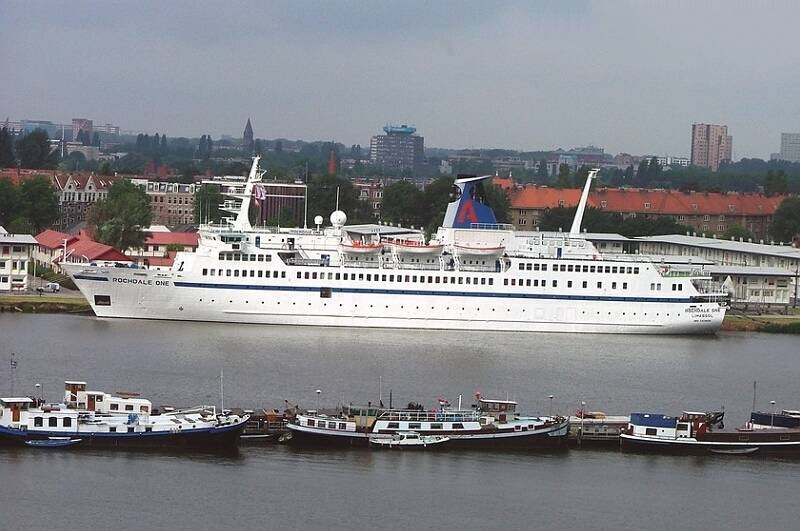
- As Rochdale One in Amsterdam

History

Cyprus
- Name: Ayvasovskiy (Russian: Айвазовский) (1977-1997); Carina (1997-2000); Primexpress Island (2000-2004); Rochdale One (2004-2013)
- Operator: Danube Shipping Company
- Builder: Ateliers et Chantiers Dubigeon-Normandie, Nantes, France
- Launched: 27 July 1976
- Identification: IMO number: 7411959
- Fate: Scrapped in 2013

General characteristics
- Type: Cruise ship
- Tonnage: 7,662 GRT
- Length: 121.49 m (398 ft 7 in)
- Beam: 17.48 m (57 ft 4 in)
- Draught: 4.5 m (14 ft 9 in)
- Depth: 9 m (29 ft 6 in)
- Propulsion: 2 × Pielstick 8PC2-5L-400 diesel engines, 7,650 kW (10,259 hp)
- Speed: 16.5 knots (30.6 km/h; 19.0 mph)
- Capacity: 328 passengers

M/V Rochdale One was a cruise ship built by the French shipyard Ateliers et Chantiers Dubigeon-Normandie at Nantes in 1977 for the Soviet Union. As the Ayvasovskiy (Russian: Айвазовский) she was operated by the Danube Shipping Company, mainly in the Black Sea and the Mediterranean. At around 7,600 GRT, with a length of 121.5 metres (399 ft) and a draught of 4.5 metres (15 ft), she was small for a cruise ship and carried only 328 passengers.

In 1997, she was chartered by German company Phoenix Reisen, and renamed Carina. In 2000, she was sold and renamed Primexpress Island, sailing out of Cyprus as a floating casino. However, in 2001 the ship was arrested at the port of Limassol because of unpaid bills.

Eventually the ship was acquired by three Dutch housing associations; Algemene Woningbouw Vereniging (AWV), DUWO, and Woningstichting Rochdale, who agreed to cooperate in order to alleviate the extreme shortage of student accommodation in Amsterdam. The ship was towed to Greece to be converted into an accommodation vessel before sailing to Amsterdam, arriving there on 8 July 2004. Renamed Rochdale One, she was used at Amsterdam from 2004 until 2009 as a home for 194 students. The ship was then laid up until August 2011, when she was towed to 's-Gravendeel, Netherlands, before being sold to a Lebanese company. In February 2012, she was towed to Tripoli, Lebanon.

In July 2013, after a failed attempt to sell the ship to Russian buyers, she sailed to Aliağa, Turkey, to be scrapped.
