= List of ships named Black Watch =

A number of ships have been named Black Watch including:

- Black Watch (full rigged ship), a large sailing ship built in Windsor, Nova Scotia
- MS Black Watch (1938) a passenger ship launched in 1938 and used as a depot ship by the Kriegsmarine in World War II, she was sunk in 1945
- MS Black Watch (1971), a cruise ship launched in 1971 as Royal Viking Star she was renamed Black Watch in 1996
