= MS Black Watch (1971) =

Cruise ship built in 1972

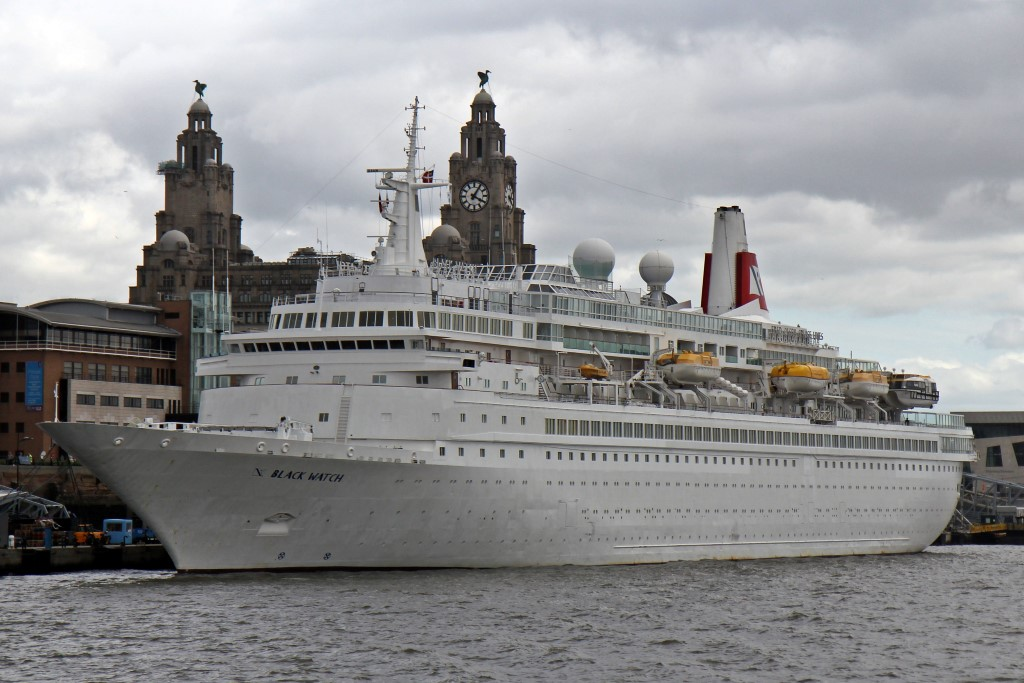
- Black Watch in Liverpool

History
- Name: 1972–1991: Royal Viking Star; 1991–1994: Westward; 1994–1996: Star Odyssey; 1996–2022: Black Watch; 2022: Bodun; 2022: Odin
- Operator: 1972–1991: Royal Viking Line; 1991–1994: Norwegian Cruise Line; 1994–1996: Royal Cruise Line; 1996–2020: Fred. Olsen Cruise Lines; 2020–2022: Miray International
- Port of registry: 1972–1988: Bergen and Oslo, Norway; 1988–1998: Nassau, Bahamas; 1998–2001: Hvitsten, Norway; 2001–2022: Nassau, Bahamas; 2022: Palau
- Builder: Wärtsilä Helsinki Shipyard, Finland
- Yard number: 395
- Laid down: 1 July 1970
- Launched: 1 May 1971
- Sponsored by: Mrs Thor Heyerdahl
- Completed: 1 June 1972
- In service: 1972
- Out of service: June 2022
- Identification: Call sign: C6RS5; IMO number: 7108930; MMSI number: 311166000
- Fate: Scrapped in 2022

General characteristics (as built)
- Type: Cruise ship
- Tonnage: 21,847 GRT; 3,595 DWT
- Length: 177.70 m (583 ft 0 in)
- Beam: 25.19 m (82 ft 8 in)
- Draught: 7.30 m (23 ft 11 in)
- Installed power: 4 × Wärtsilä-Sulzer 9ZH40/48; 13,240 kW (combined)
- Speed: 21 knots (39 km/h; 24 mph)
- Capacity: 539 passengers

General characteristics (after 1981 refit)
- Tonnage: 28,221 GRT; 5,656 DWT
- Length: 205.47 m (674 ft 1 in)
- Beam: 25.20 m (82 ft 8 in)
- Draught: 7.55 m (24 ft 9 in)
- Capacity: 758 passengers
- Notes: Otherwise same as built

General characteristics (after 2005 refit)
- Tonnage: 28,613 GT; 11,854 NT; 5,656 DWT
- Installed power: 4 × MAN 7L32/40; 14,000 kW (combined)
- Propulsion: Two shafts; KaMeWa controllable pitch propellers; Bow and stern thrusters
- Speed: 22 knots (41 km/h; 25 mph)
- Capacity: 820 passengers
- Notes: Otherwise same as after 1981 refit

MS Black Watch was a Royal Viking Star-class cruise ship. She was built by Wärtsilä Helsinki Shipyard, Finland for Royal Viking Line as Royal Viking Star, entering service in 1972 as the lines first ship. She has also sailed for Norwegian Cruise Lines as Westward and Royal Cruise Line as Star Odyssey. As of June 18, 2022 she has been beached for scrapping as Odin at Alang, India.

== History ==
=== Royal Viking Star ===
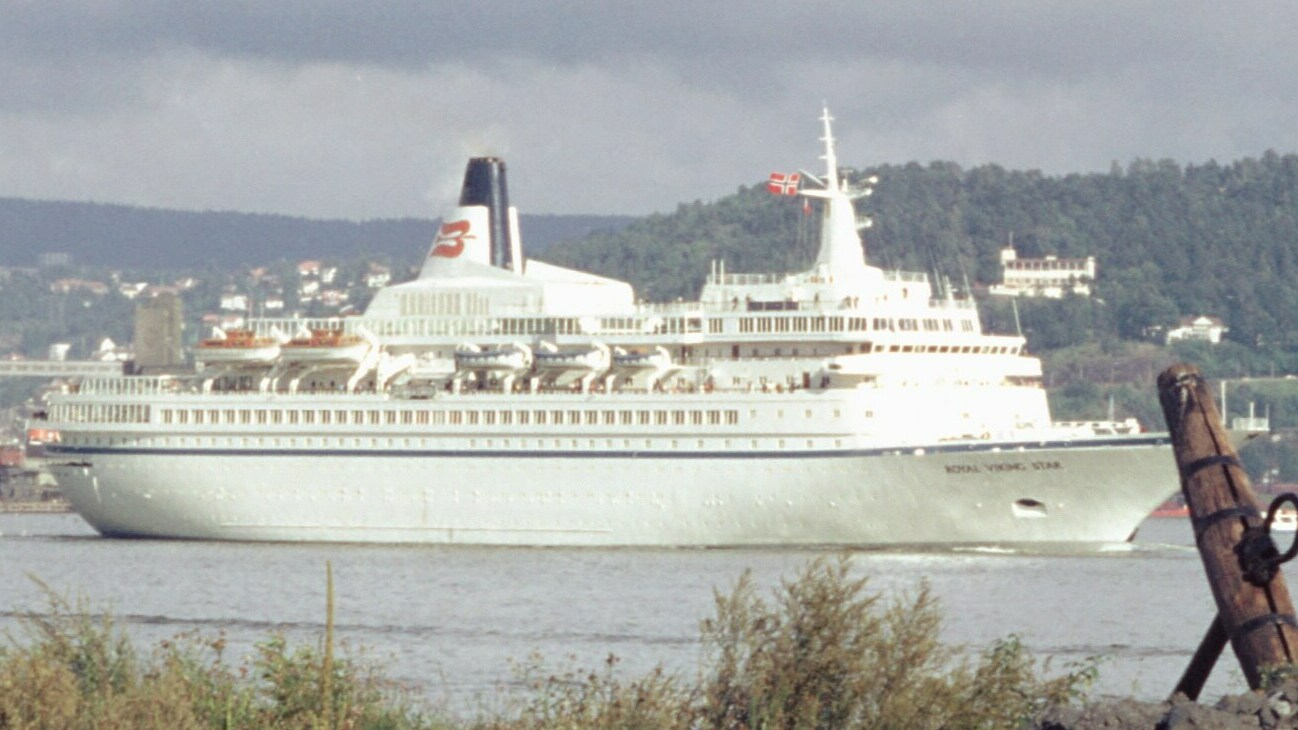
Royal Viking Star in Oslo, Norway in 1972

Royal Viking Line was established in 1970 as a joint project between the American businessman Warren Titus and three Norwegian shipping companies (including Kloster Cruises, the owner of Norwegian Cruise Line). The aim of the new company was to offer luxury cruises to destinations around the world as an alternative to Caribbean cruising. For this end the company ordered three purpose-built luxury cruise ships from Wärtsilä Helsinki New Shipyard in Finland.

The first of the new ships, named Royal Viking Star, was launched on 12 May 1971 and entered service on 26 June 1972. Her sisters, Royal Viking Sky and Royal Viking Sea, followed in 1973. The Royal Viking Line brand was clearly a success and the elegantly furnished ships were considered to be amongst the five most luxurious cruise ships in the world at the time, alongside Norwegian America Line's Sagafjord and Vistafjord. In 1981 Royal Viking Star was lengthened by 27.77 metres (91 ft 1 in) at Seebeckwerft, Bremerhaven, West Germany.

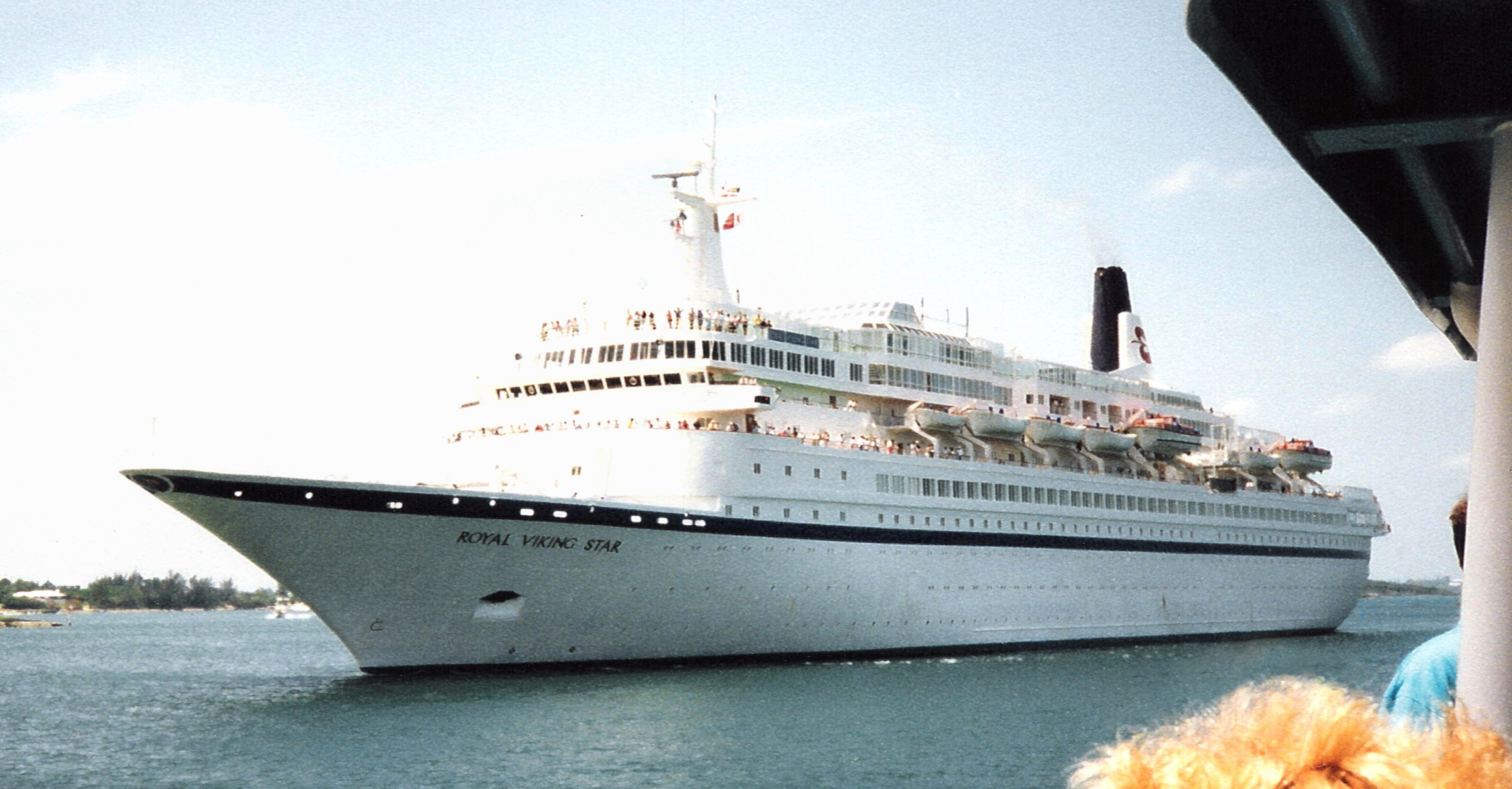
Royal Viking Star in Bermuda in 1989, after lengthening in 1981

As the 1980s progressed it became clear that the luxury cruise lines such as Royal Viking could not survive without the support of a larger company, with the operating costs of a handful of luxury ships being too high to be truly profitable. Royal Viking Line was acquired by Kloster Cruises in 1984, but its operations were initially kept separate from those of Norwegian Cruise Line.

=== Westward ===
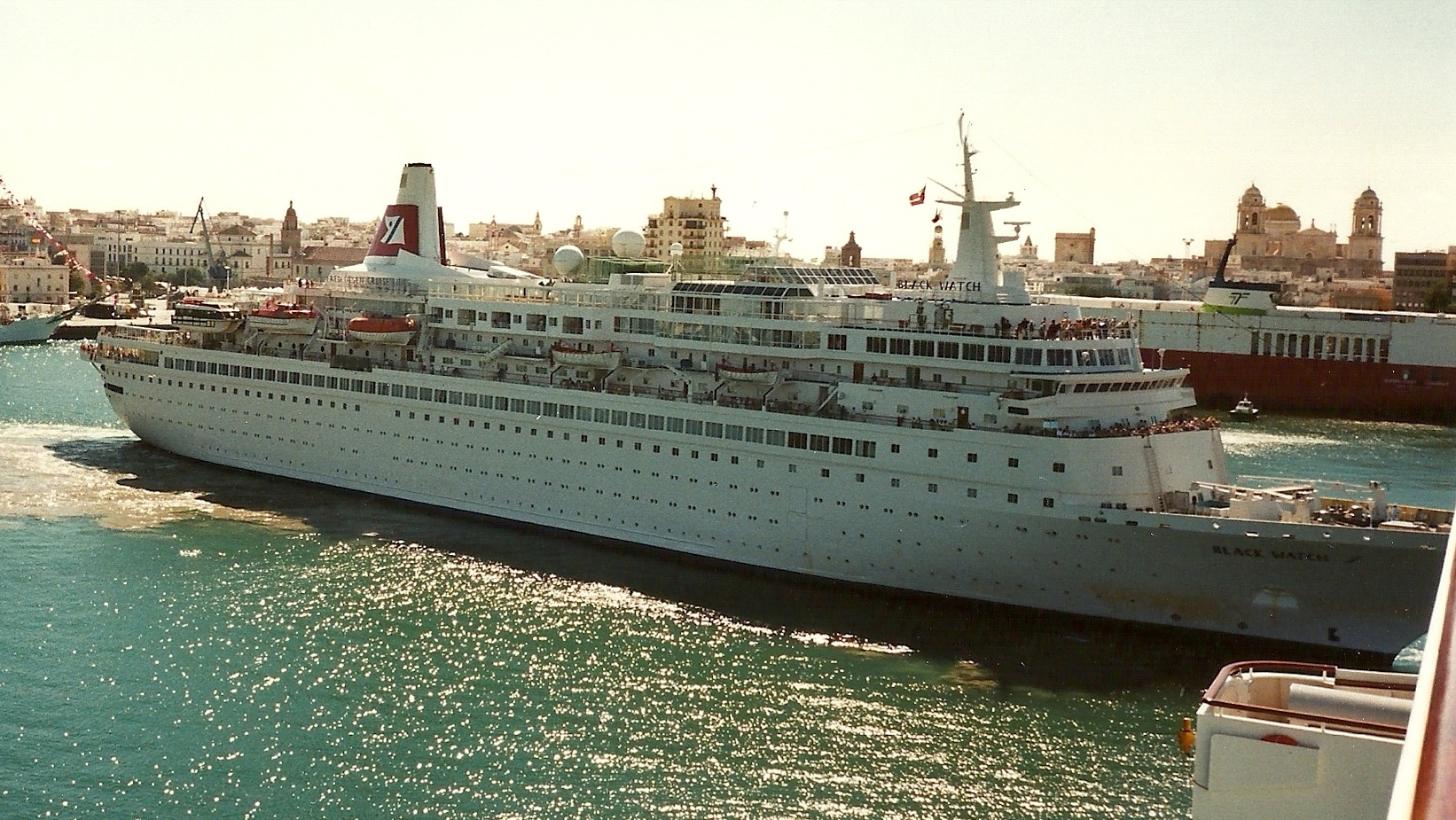
Black Watch

In April 1991 Royal Viking Star was transferred from the Royal Viking Line to the Norwegian Cruise Line and renamed Westward. With NCL the ship was used for cruising from New York City to Bermuda and on to the Caribbean Sea.

=== Star Odyssey ===
In April 1994, the ship was transferred to the fleet of NCL's subsidiary Royal Cruise Line, renamed Star Odyssey and used for cruising around the Mediterranean Sea. Here the ship joined her sister Royal Viking Sea that had sailed as Royal Odyssey since 1991. The career of Star Odyssey was to prove short however, as Norwegian Cruise Line was facing financial difficulties in the mid-1990s and were forced to sell off various assets. In October 1996 the ship was sold to Fred. Olsen Cruise Lines.

=== Black Watch ===
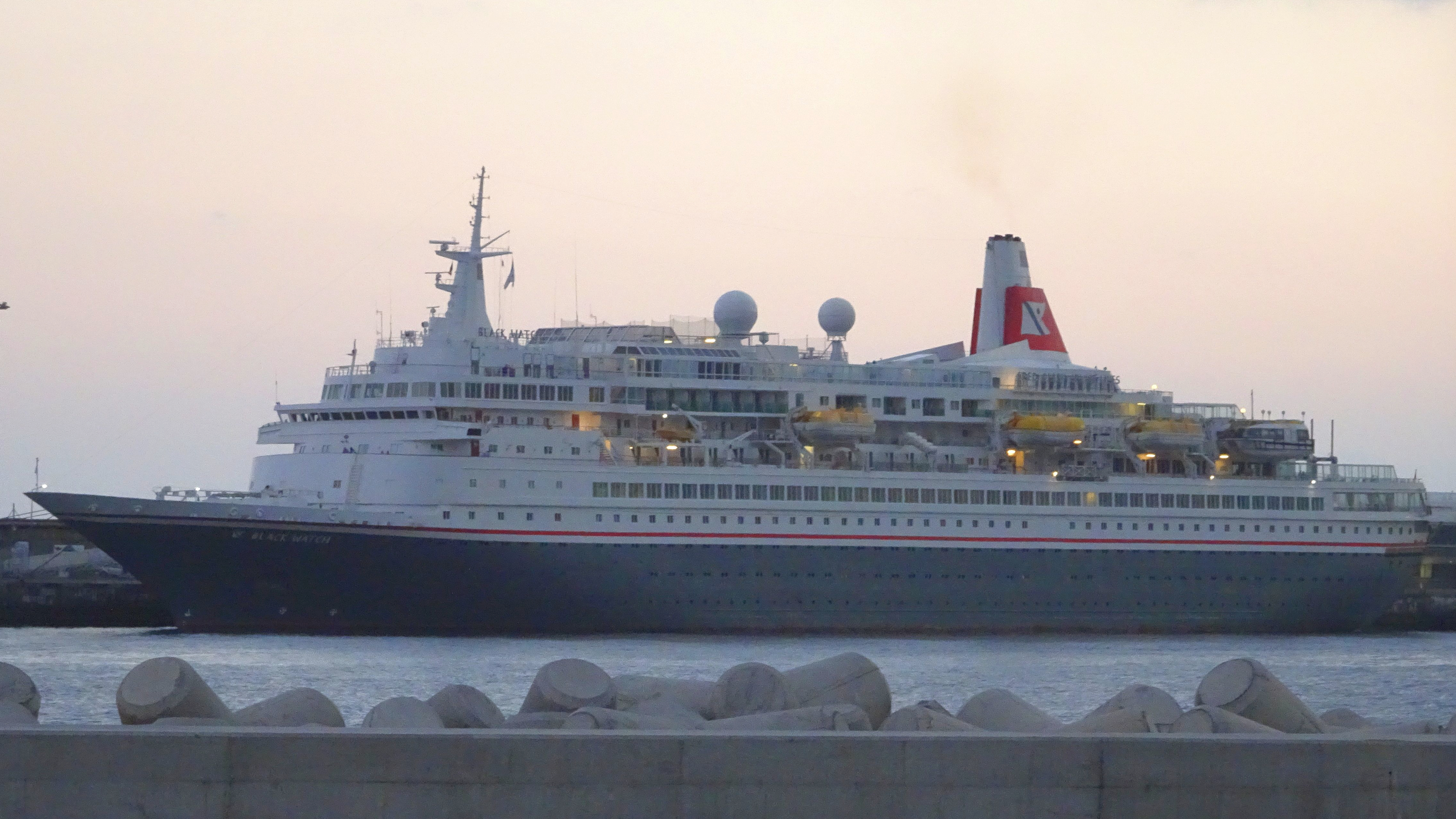
Black Watch in Funchal on 2 July 2016

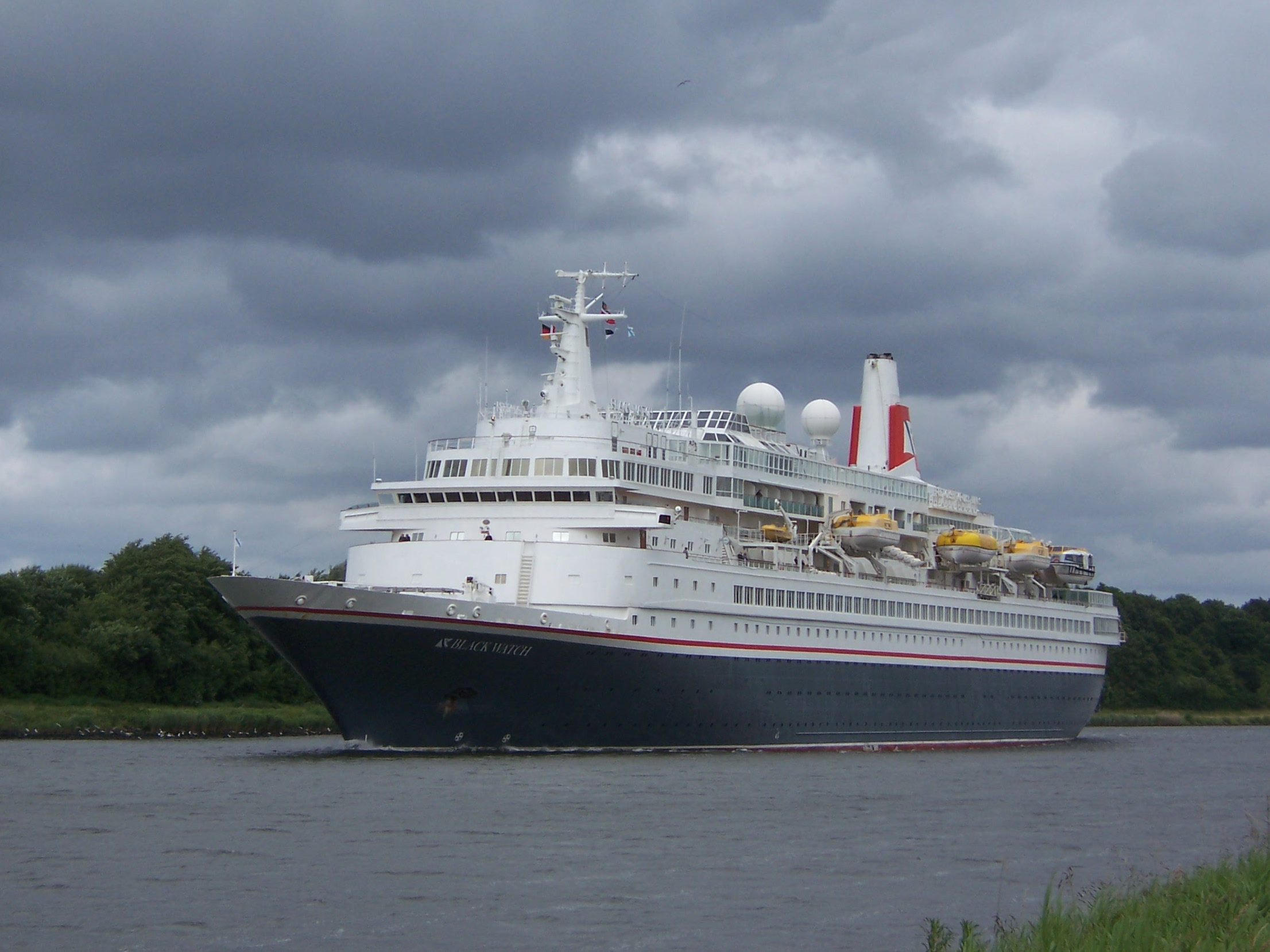
Black Watch

The ship was renamed Black Watch (a traditional name in Fred. Olsen fleet) and entered service for Fred. Olsen Cruise Lines on 15 November 1996. In February 1997 the ship suffered engine problems while outside Marmaris, Turkey, and had to be docked for two weeks at Valletta, Malta for repairs. From April 2005 onwards, the ship was docked for two months at Blohm & Voss, Hamburg, Germany. During this time her engines were upgraded and interiors refurbished. In July 2007, the ship was the subject of a Legionnaires' disease outbreak which affected a number of passengers in their seventies and eighties. A norovirus outbreak infected 130 passengers and crew during a cruise to Scandinavia in September 2013.

==== COVID-19 ====
On 13 April 2020, when the cruise ship moored up in the Firth of Forth, eight crew members tested positive for COVID-19.

==== Sale ====
On 21 August 2020, Fred. Olsen announced that the Black Watch and her sister ship Boudicca were sold as accommodation ships for workers. Both of the Black Watch's original sister ships were scrapped, making it the last surviving ship of the original Royal Viking Line trio.

==== Scrapping as Odin ====
In May 2022, lawyers for Fred Olsen Cruise Lines went after the buyers of a former cruise ship to block its imminent beaching in India. Such a move would violate a sales contract clause calling for green scrapping of the vessel once its end-of-life job as an accommodation vessel is over. In June 2022, Fred Olsen secured a last-minute stay of execution for its former vessel seeking its return to Turkey to be properly recycled per its agreement of sale. The beaching was stopped by court but the arrest can be canceled by a caution of $4.16 million, the value of the ship.

The ship, based on AIS data, was beached at Alang, India on 18 June 2022. The scrapping process should begin soon due to the beaching of the ship.
