= Phoenix Reisen =

Germany-based travel agency that also operates a fleet of cruise ships

- Industry: Tourism
- Founded: 1988
- Headquarters: Bonn, Germany
- Products: travel agency maritime cruises
- Website: https://www.phoenixreisen.com/

Phoenix Reisen is a Germany-based travel agency that also operates a fleet of cruise ships. The company first entered the cruise business in 1988 by chartering the Soviet Union-owned cruise ship SS Maxim Gorkiy.

== History ==
Phoenix Reisen first begun operating cruises under its own brand in 1988 when the company chartered the West German-built cruise ship SS Maxim Gorkiy from the Soviet Union-based Black Sea Shipping Company on a 20-year charter agreement. In 1993 a second ship joined the Phoenix Reisen fleet, when SS Albatros was chartered from V-Ships. Unlike the Maxim Gorkiy, which retained the colours of her owners in Phoenix service, the Albatros was painted in Phoenix Reisen's own colours with a turquoise funnel displaying the company logo.

Due to numerous mechanical problems, Phoenix Reisen decided to prematurely terminate the charter of the Albatros in December 2003. As a replacement Phoenix quickly chartered MS Crown in January 2004, which was renamed MS Albatros. In 2005 the company fleet expanded to include three ships for the first time when MS Alexander von Humboldt (2005) was chartered from V-Ships. A fourth ship followed in 2006 with the charter of MS Amadea, a higher-class vessel compared with the rest of the Phoenix Reisen fleet. In 2008 the first Alexander von Humboldt was replaced by a larger vessel chartered from Club Cruise, confusingly also named MS Alexander von Humboldt (before entering service the ship was marketed as Alexander von Humboldt II, but she eventually received the same name as the ship she replaced). In late 2008 the charter of the Maxim Gorkiy ended, and due to high fuel prices combined with the high fuel consumption of the ship's steam turbines Phoenix Reisen decided not to renew the charter. In May 2009 Phoenix Reisen chartered MS Athena (2005) from Nina SpA. In April 2011, the company took delivery of MV Artania, which formerly sailed as MV Artemis for P&O Cruises. In July 2019 the fleet was increased with a former HAL ship.

== Fleet ==
=== Current fleet (Ocean) ===
Ship	Built	In service	Registered Owner	Tonnage	Flag	Notes	Image
Amadea	1991	2006 onwards	Amadea Shipping Company	29,008 GT	Bahamas		
Amera	1988	2019 onwards	Amera Shipping Company	38,848 GT	Bahamas		
Artania	1984	2011 onwards	Artania Shipping Ltd / Artania GmbH	44,588 GT	Bahamas		

=== Former fleet ===
Ship	Built	In Service	Chartered from	Tonnage	Flag	Status	Image
Maxim Gorkiy	1969	1988–2008	Black Sea Shipping Company; Sovcomflot	24,981 GT	Soviet Union; Bahamas	Scrapped at Alang, India in 2009	
Albatros	1957	1993–2003	V-Ships	21,985 GRT	Bahamas	Scrapped at Alang, India in 2004	
Carina	1977	1997-2000	Danube Shipping Company	7,662 GRT	Cyprus	Scrapped at Aliağa, Turkey in 2013	
Albatros	1973	2004-2020	Albatros Shipping Company	28,518 GT	Bahamas	Scrapped at Alang, India in 2021	
Alexander von Humboldt	1990	2005–2008	V-Ships	12,331 GT	Bahamas	Since 2008 sailing as Minerva for Swan Hellenic	
Alexander von Humboldt	1990	2008	Club Cruise	15,343 GT	Bahamas	Currently sailing as the Voyager for Voyages of Discovery	
Athena	1948	2009	Nina SpA	16,144 GT	Portugal	Undergoing scrapping at Ghent	
Deutschland	1998	2026	Absolute Nevada LLC	22,400 GT	Bahamas	It was chartered from Absolute Nevada. It was sailing as World Odyssey for Semester at Sea from September until April each year.	
