= MS Amera =

Cruise ship operated by Phoenix Reisen

Amera
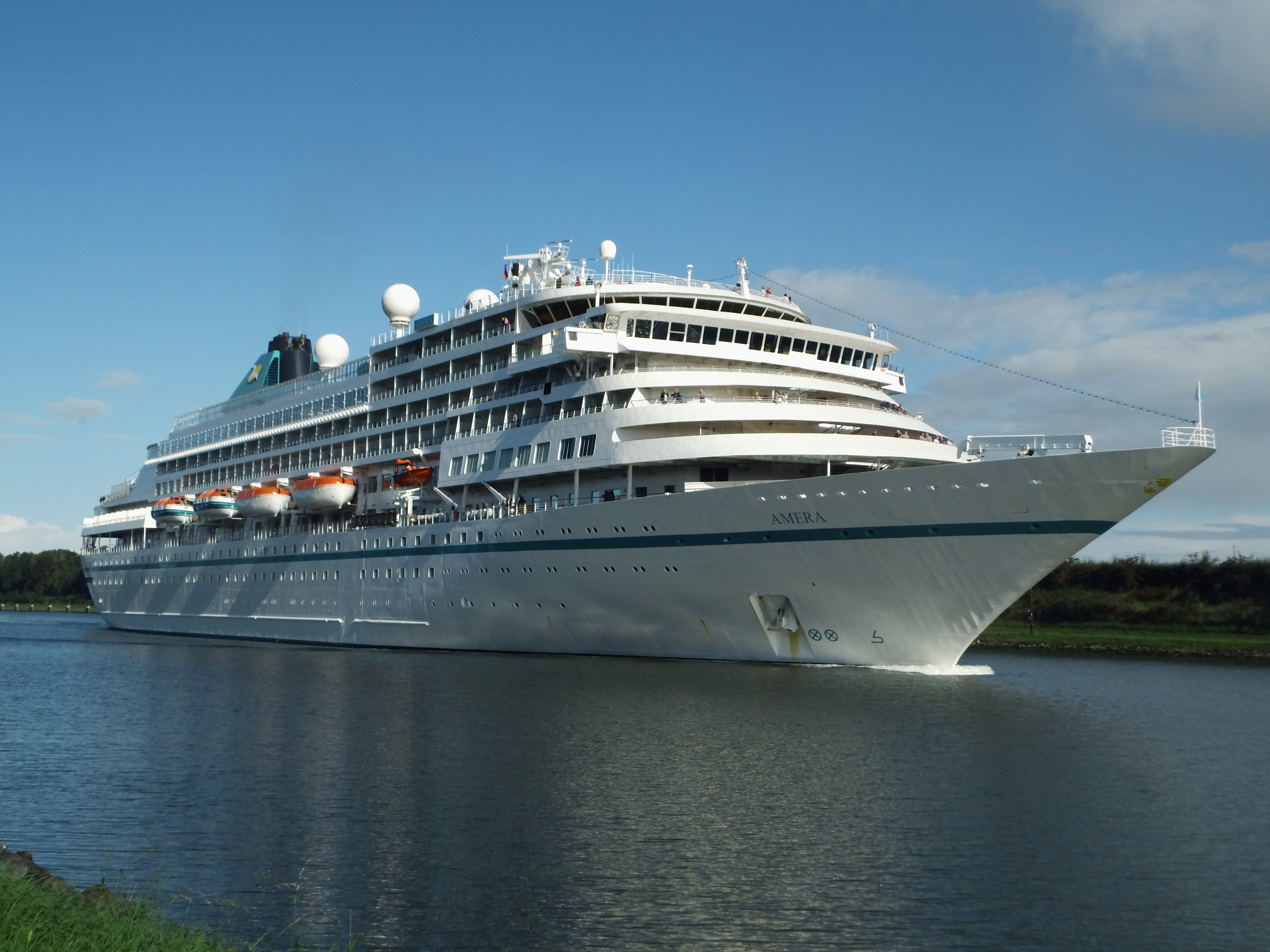
- Amera in the Kiel Canal, 2019

History
- Name: 1988–1999: Royal Viking Sun; 1999–2002: Seabourn Sun; 2002–2019: Prinsendam; 2019–present: Amera
- Owner: 1988–1994: Royal Viking Line; 1994–1998: Trafalgar House; 1998–2019: Carnival Corporation & plc; 2019–present: Phoenix Reisen
- Operator: 1988–1994: Royal Viking Line; 1994–1998: Cunard Line; 1998–2002: Seabourn Cruise Line; 2002–2019: Holland America Line; 2019–present: Phoenix Reisen
- Port of registry: 1988–2002: Nassau, Bahamas; 2002–2013: Rotterdam, Netherlands; 2013–present: Nassau, Bahamas
- Builder: Wärtsilä Marine Perno Shipyard; Turku, Finland
- Yard number: 1296
- Launched: May 1988
- Christened: 8 January 1989
- Acquired: 26 November 1988
- In service: 1988–present
- Identification: Call sign: PBGH; IMO number: 8700280; MMSI number: 311000840
- Nickname(s): 2002–2019: Elegant Explorer
- Status: In service

General characteristics (as built)
- Class & type: Cruise ship
- Tonnage: 38,848 GT
- Length: 205.0 m (672.6 ft)
- Beam: 29.0 m (95.1 ft)
- Draught: 7.25 m (23.8 ft)
- Decks: 9 passenger decks
- Speed: 22 knots (41 km/h; 25 mph) (max); 18.5 knots (34.3 km/h; 21.3 mph) (service)
- Capacity: 740 passengers
- Crew: 460

General characteristics (2002-2019)
- Capacity: 835 passengers
- Crew: 443

General characteristics (as Amera)
- Class & type: Lloyd's Register cruise ship
- Tonnage: 39,051 GT
- Length: 672.57 ft (205.0 m)
- Beam: 95.14 ft (29.0 m)
- Draught: 23.78 ft (7.25 m)
- Decks: 9 passenger decks
- Installed power: Wärtsilä-Sulzer, 4 × 7.179 PS
- Speed: 22 knots (41 km/h; 25 mph) (max); 18 knots (33 km/h; 21 mph) (service)
- Capacity: 835 passengers
- Crew: 440

MS Amera (formerly Royal Viking Sun, Seabourn Sun and Prinsendam) is a cruise ship operated by Phoenix Reisen. She was launched in 1988 as Royal Viking Sun for Royal Viking Line, and began operating for Cunard Line under the same name in 1994. She was renamed Seabourn Sun when Seabourn Cruise Line acquired the ship in 1999. In 2002, Seabourn transferred the ship to Holland America Line, which was renamed as Prinsendam. In 2018, Prinsendam was sold to Phoenix Reisen, debuting in 2019, and rechristened Amera in Bremerhaven on 16 August 2019.

== History ==
=== 1988–1999: Royal Viking Sun ===
==== Royal Viking Line ====
She was launched in 1988 as Royal Viking Sun for Royal Viking Line. Christened by godparents James Stewart and Gloria Stewart, and she was the largest ship in the fleet at the time she entered service.

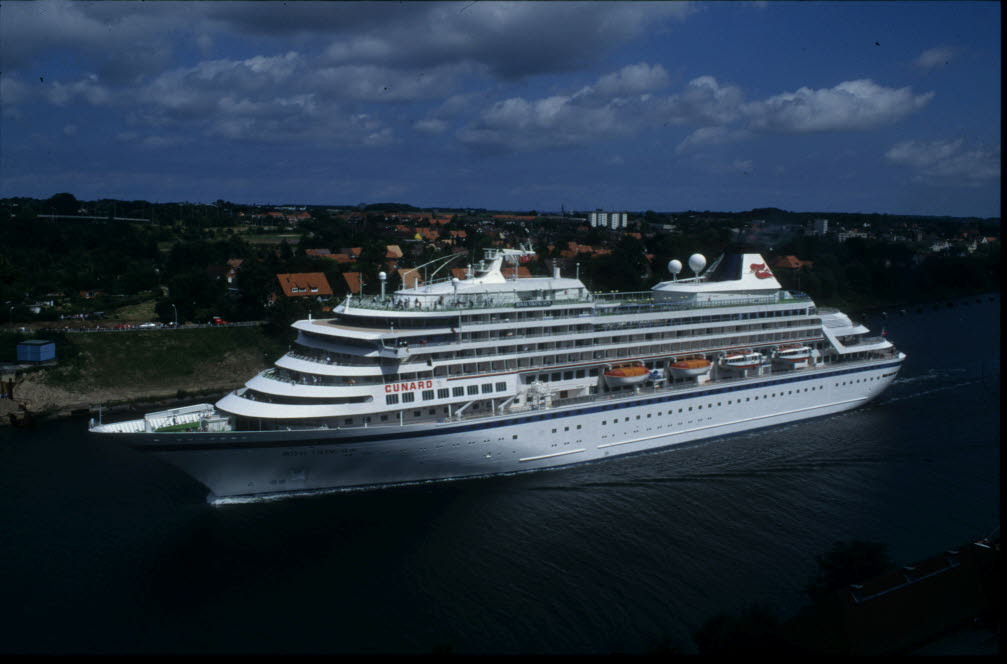
Royal Viking Sun prior to additional Cunard livery

==== Cunard Line ====
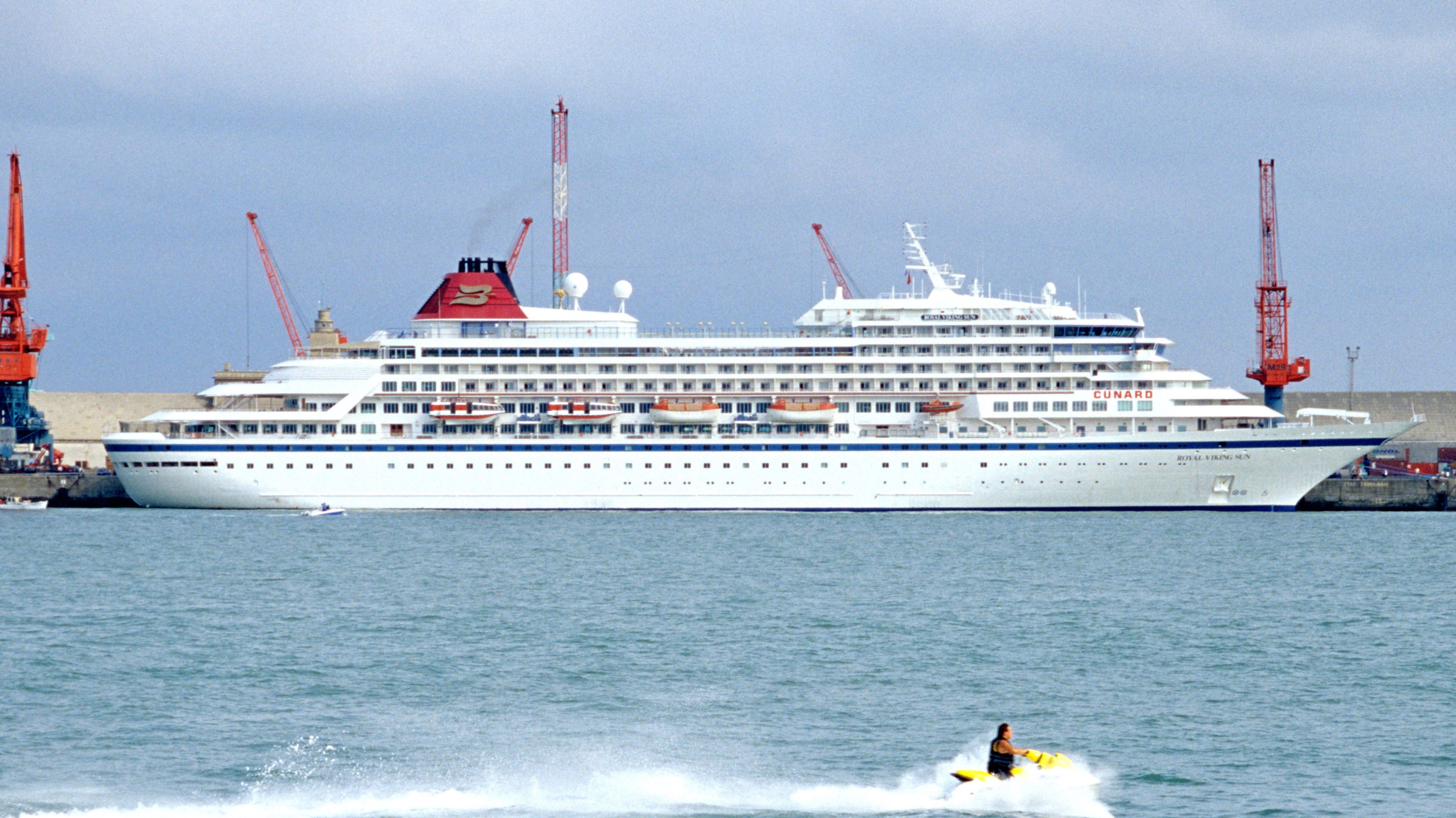
Amera as Royal Viking Sun

In 1994, Cunard Line purchased Royal Viking Sun and the Royal Viking brand when Royal Viking Line ceased operations. Cunard continued to operate her under the same name and initially retained the vessel's original livery. Later, Cunard repainted her funnel in their colours but retained the Royal Viking logo. In April 1996, the ship tore a hole in its hull after hitting a reef in the Red Sea about fifteen miles off the coast of Sharm El Sheikh while on its way to Aqaba.

=== 1999–2002: Seabourn Sun ===
In 1999, Carnival Corporation merged Cunard and Seabourn and moved Royal Viking Sun to Seabourn. After an extensive refit, she was renamed Seabourn Sun. Her last cruise for Seabourn was a circumnavigation of South America in 2002.

=== 2002–2019: Prinsendam ===
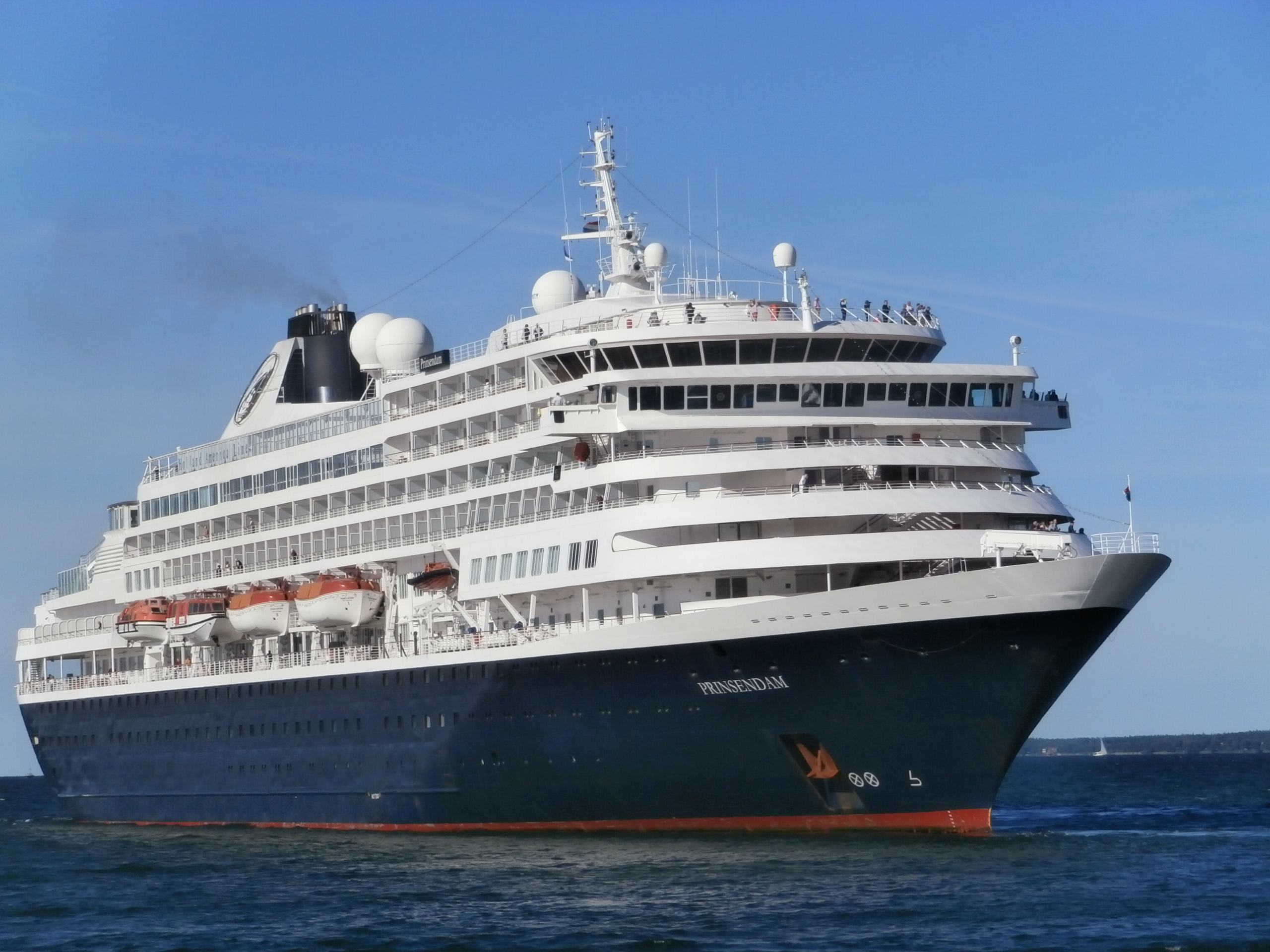
Amera as Prinsendam

In 2002, Seabourn Sun was transferred to sister brand Holland America Line, after Seabourn chose to focus on its fleet's smaller vessels. Renamed Prinsendam, she underwent a refit before beginning operations.

On 1 February 2007, Prinsendam was hit by two 12-metre-tall (39 ft) rogue waves near Cape Horn; 40 injuries were reported, with some requiring hospitalisation.

On 22 March 2012, Prinsendam was en route to Portimao when she received a distress call from the Portuguese fishing boat Dario, which was sinking with eight people aboard. When the ship arrived, Dario's crew was entering a life raft. The Portuguese Coast Guard directed Prinsendam to pick up the fishermen and stand by for a helicopter to take the eight men to shore.

During her career with Holland America, she had undertaken cruises to Antarctica, and was able to transit the Kiel Canal due to her low height above the waterline.

=== 2019–present: Amera ===
In July 2018, Holland America announced that Prinsendam had been sold to Phoenix Reisen. However, she was chartered back to Holland America to continue operating her scheduled voyages until 1 July 2019.

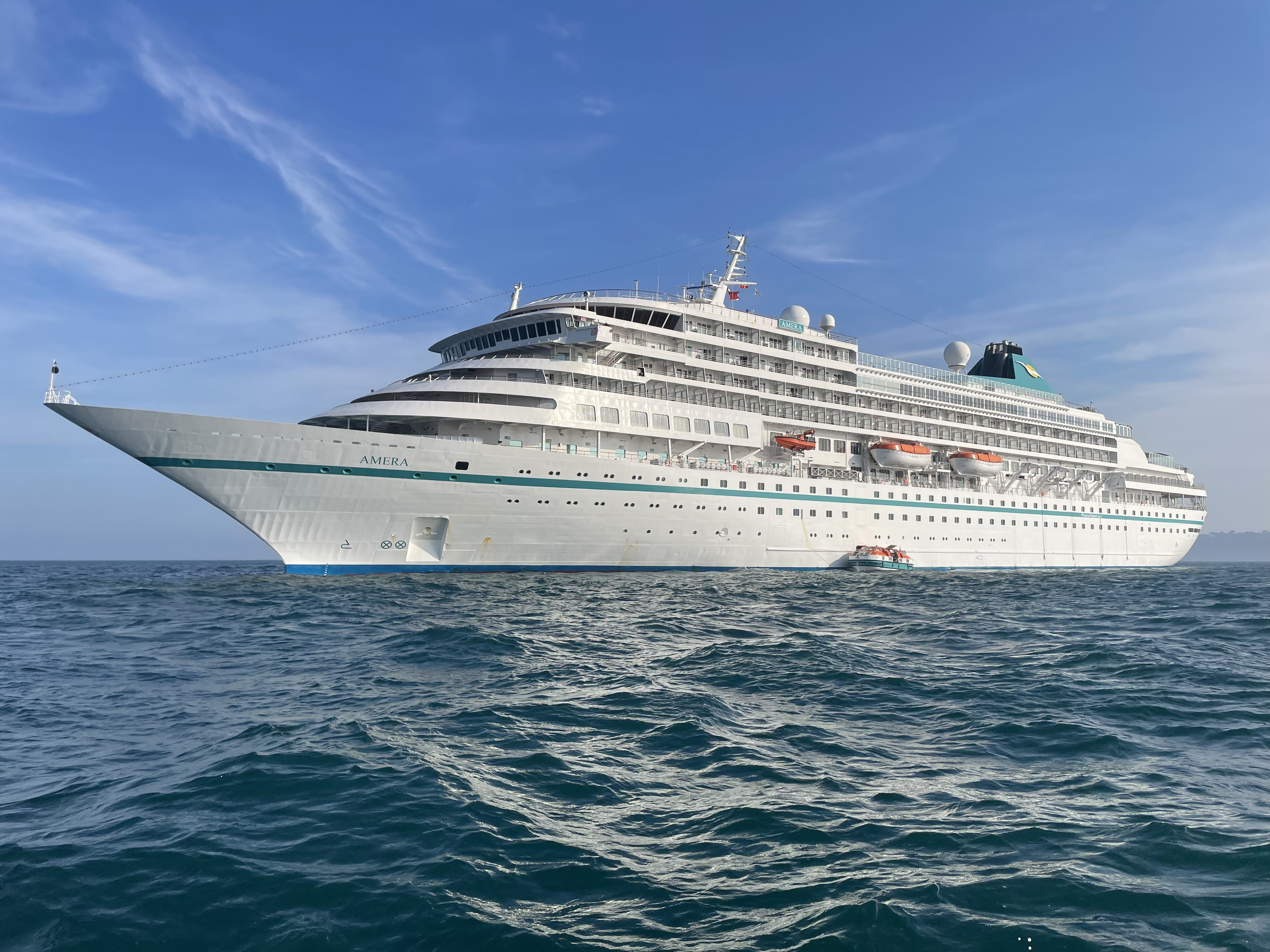
Amera tendering in Guernsey in May 2024

On 2 July 2019, Prinsendam began her six-week renovation at Blohm+Voss in Hamburg, and left on 12 August 2019 for Bremerhaven. She was rechristened Amera in Bremerhaven on 16 August 2019 by Petra Kaiser, a veteran Phoenix Reisen employee, before sailing to Dover for her maiden voyage to Antwerp, Amsterdam, and the Norwegian fjords, where she cruised for her inaugural season. She operated Mediterranean cruises beginning in October 2019.
