= MS Albatros =

Cruise ship (1973–2021)

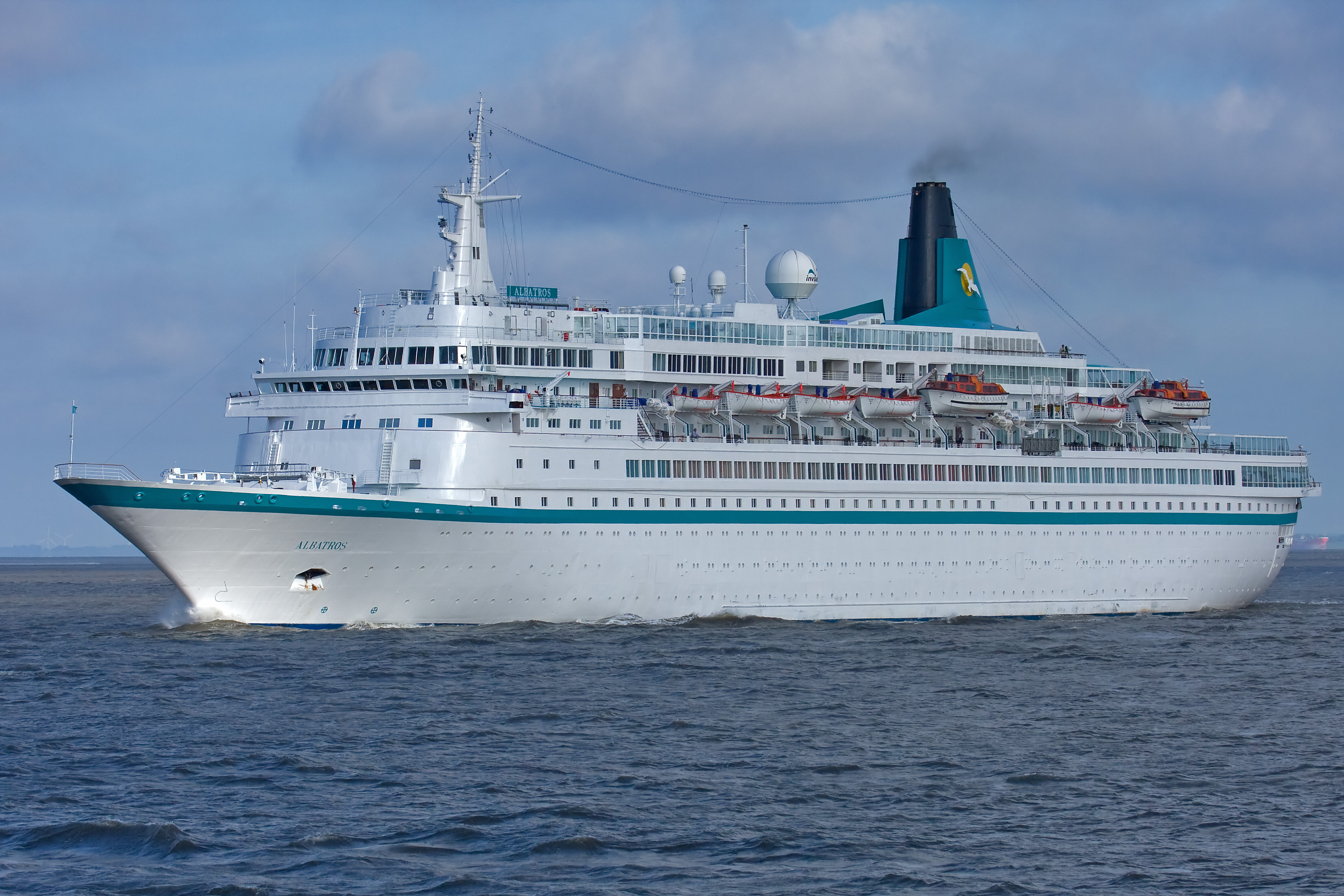
- Albatros in 2009

History
- Name: 1973–1991: Royal Viking Sea; 1991–1997: Royal Odyssey; 1997–2001: Norwegian Star; 2001–2002: Norwegian Star 1; 2002–2004: Crown; 2004–2021: Albatros; 2021: Tros
- Operator: 1972–1991: Royal Viking Line; 1991–1997: Royal Cruise Line; 1997–1998: Norwegian Cruise Line; 1999–2001: Norwegian Capricorn Line; 2001–2002: Star Cruises; 2002: Crown Investments; 2002–2004: Spanish Cruise Line; 2004–2020: Phoenix Reisen; 2020–2021: Pick Albatros Group; 2021: Alang Breaker
- Port of registry: 1973–1987: Oslo, Norway; 1987–2021: Nassau, Bahamas; 2021: Gabon
- Builder: Wärtsilä Helsinki Shipyard, Finland
- Yard number: 397
- Launched: 19 January 1973
- Completed: 1973
- Acquired: 16 November 1973
- In service: 25 November 1973
- Out of service: 2020
- Identification: Call sign: C6CN4; IMO number: 7304314; MMSI number: 626151000
- Fate: Scrapped in 2021

General characteristics (as built)
- Tonnage: 20,018 GRT; 3,594 DWT
- Length: 177.70 m (583 ft 0 in)
- Beam: 25.20 m (82 ft 8 in)
- Draught: 7.30 m (23 ft 11 in)
- Installed power: 4 × Wärtsilä-Sulzer 9ZH40/48; 13,240 kW (combined)
- Speed: 21 knots (39 km/h; 24 mph)
- Capacity: 536 passengers

General characteristics (currently)
- Tonnage: 28,518 GT; 5,936 DWT
- Length: 205.46 m (674 ft 1 in)
- Beam: 27.00 m (88 ft 7 in)
- Draught: 7.30 m (23 ft 11 in)
- Installed power: 4 × Wärtsilä 6L38A
- Propulsion: Two shafts; controllable pitch propellers
- Capacity: 812 passengers

MS Albatros was a Royal Viking Star-class cruise ship, operated by the Germany-based travel agency Phoenix Reisen until 2020 when she was taken out of service, and scrapped in 2021.

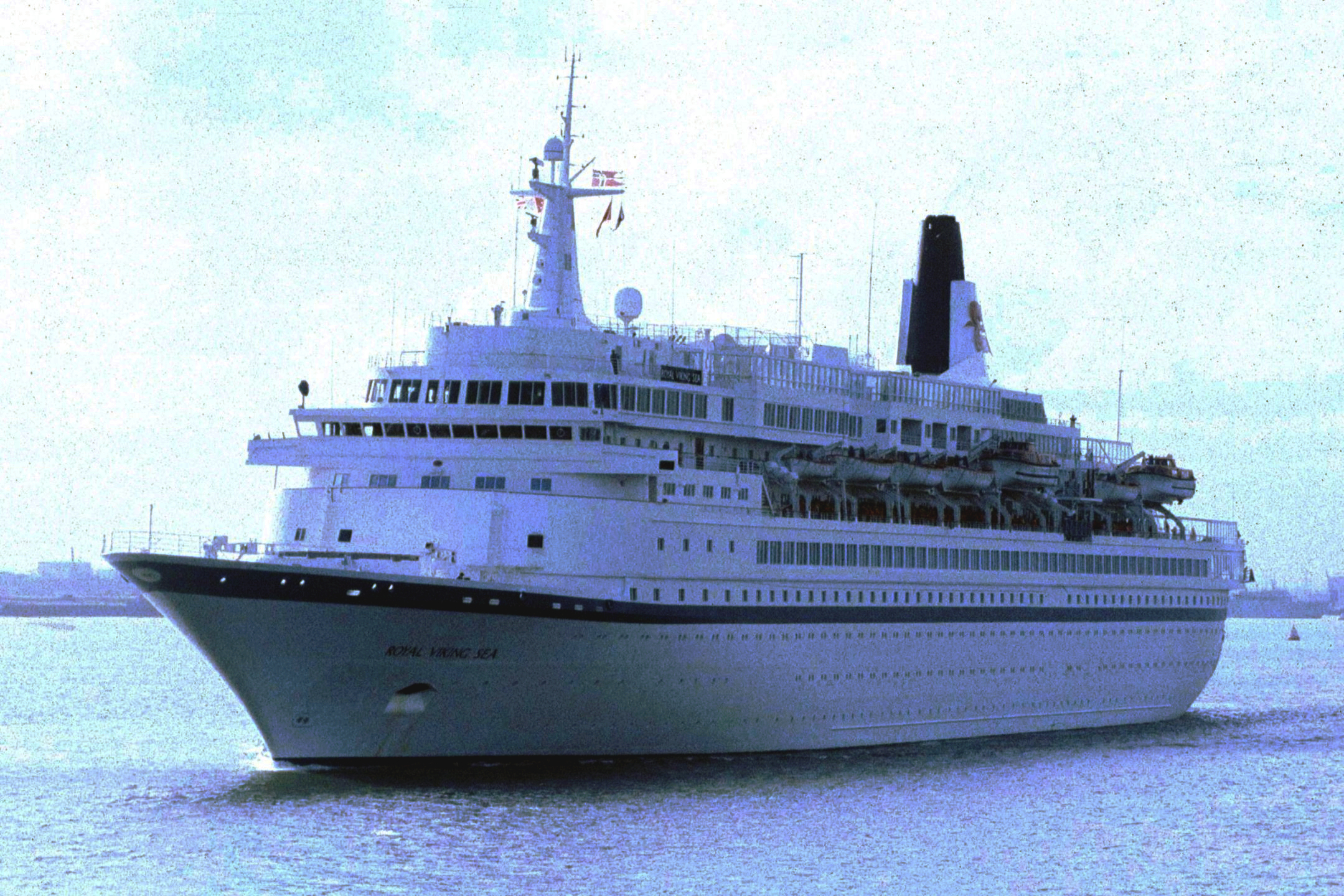
As Royal Viking Sea in 1986

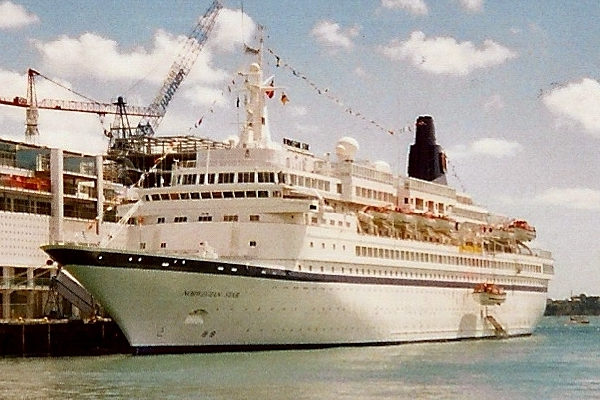
As Norwegian Star in 2000

== History ==
She was built in 1973 by Wärtsilä Helsinki Shipyard, Finland for Royal Viking Line as Royal Viking Sea, and has also sailed under the names Royal Odyssey for Royal Cruise Line, Norwegian Star for Norwegian Cruise Line and Norwegian Capricorn Line, and Crown. She was the second Albatros for Phoenix Reisen as she was the replacement of the original SS Albatros.

Albatros was also known for her Queen Elizabeth 2-esque funnel.

In October 2020 Albatros was sold as a hotel vessel for the Pick Albatros Group in the Middle East, which operates some 15 hotels and resorts in Hurghada region.

However, the project was never initiated, and the ship stayed at Hurghada until sold in 2021 for scrap, after a stop in Jeddah. She was beached in Alang, India, on 27 July 2021. Scrapping on Albatros started on 17 November 2021. According to the NGO Robin des Bois, the Hotel Ship project was a trick to export the ship from Germany to India for scrapping.
