= List of ships named SS Rotterdam =

SS Rotterdam may refer to one of seven ships of the Holland America Line:

- SS Rotterdam (1872), rigged for steam and sail; wrecked 26 September 1883
- SS Rotterdam (1886), former British Empire, later Edam III (1895); scrapped 1899
- SS Rotterdam (1897), sold 1906; later C.F. Tietgen, Dwinsk; sunk by SM U-151 in June 1918
- SS Rotterdam (1908), scrapped in 1940
- SS Rotterdam (1958), retired from Holland America Line in 1997
- MS Rotterdam (1996), sold by Holland America Line to Fred. Olsen Cruise Lines and sailing under the name MS Borealis since July 2021.
- MS Rotterdam (2020), a cruise ship which entered service in October 2021, third of Holland-America's Pinnacle class.
