= Passenger ship =

Watercraft intended to carry people on board

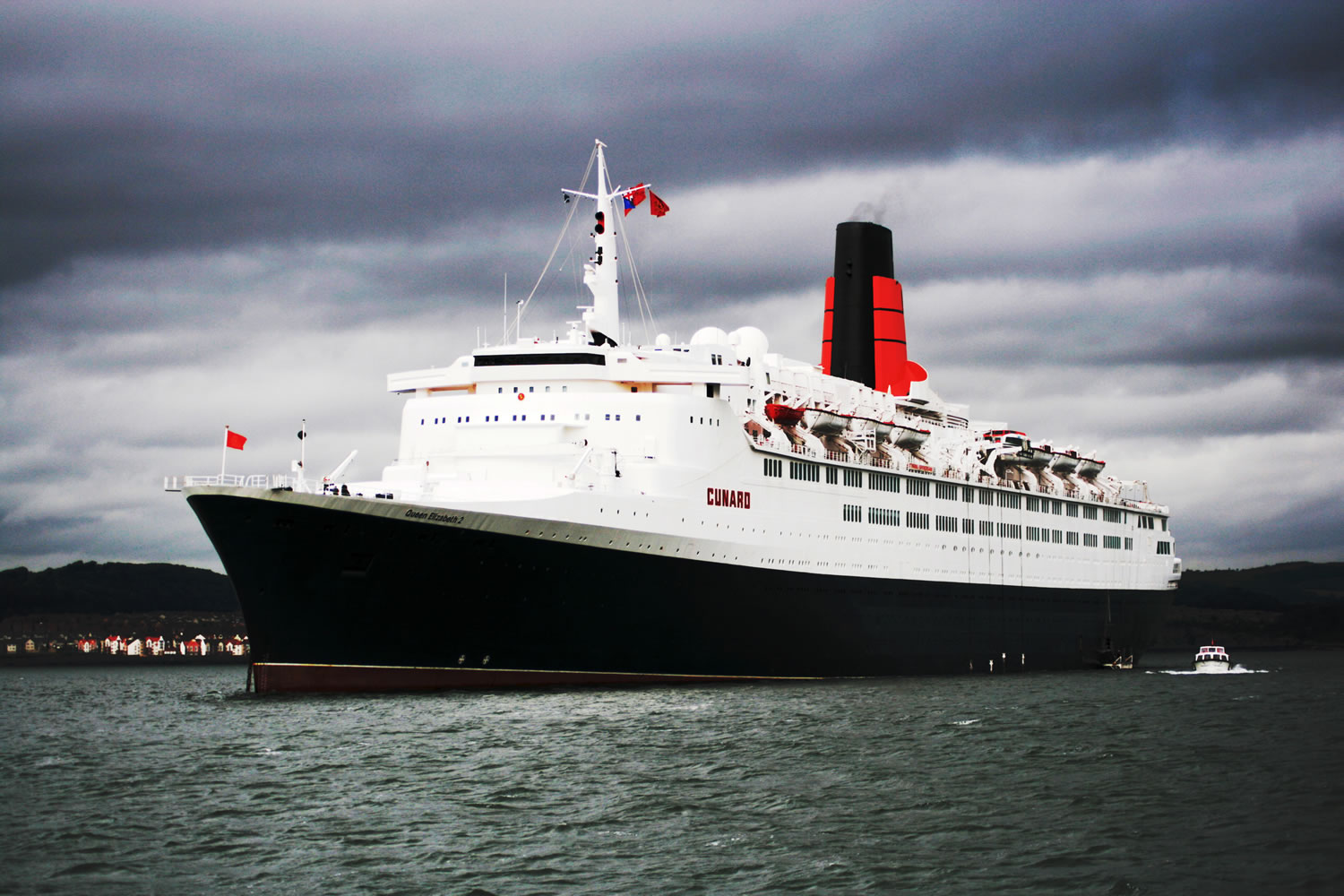
An ocean liner, Queen Elizabeth 2

A passenger ship is a merchant ship whose primary function is to carry passengers on the sea. The category does not include cargo vessels which have accommodations for limited numbers of passengers, such as the ubiquitous twelve-passenger freighters once common on the seas in which the transport of passengers is secondary to the carriage of freight. The type does however include many classes of ships designed to transport substantial numbers of passengers as well as freight. Indeed, until recently virtually all ocean liners were able to transport mail, package freight and express, and other cargo in addition to passenger luggage, and were equipped with cargo holds and derricks, kingposts, or other cargo-handling gear for that purpose. Only in more recent ocean liners and in virtually all cruise ships has this cargo capacity been eliminated.

While typically passenger ships are part of the merchant marine, passenger ships have also been used as troopships and are often commissioned as naval ships when used, for that purpose.

== Description ==
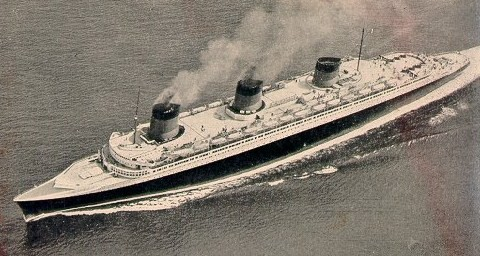
An ocean liner, Normandie

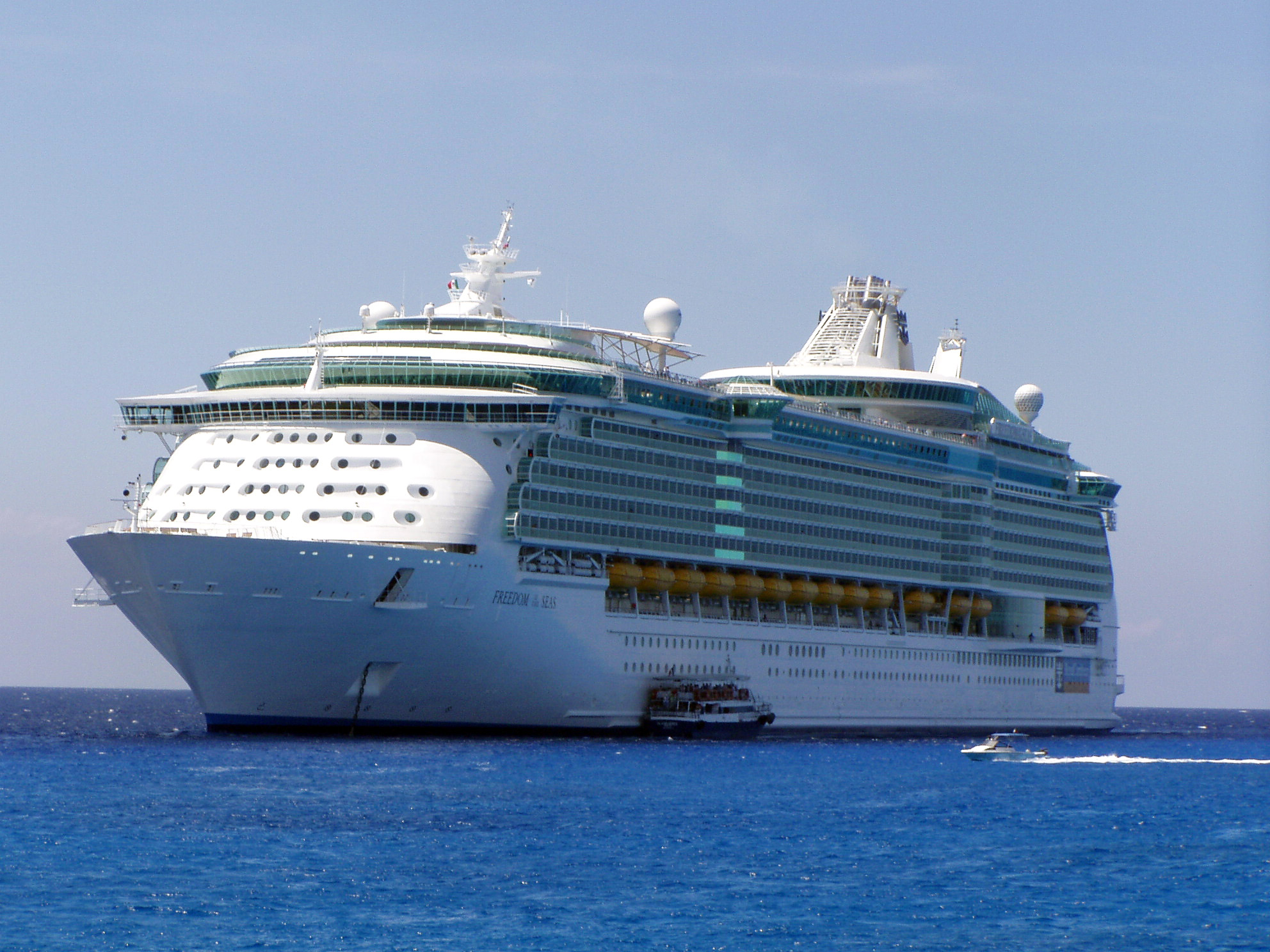
A cruise ship, Freedom of the Seas

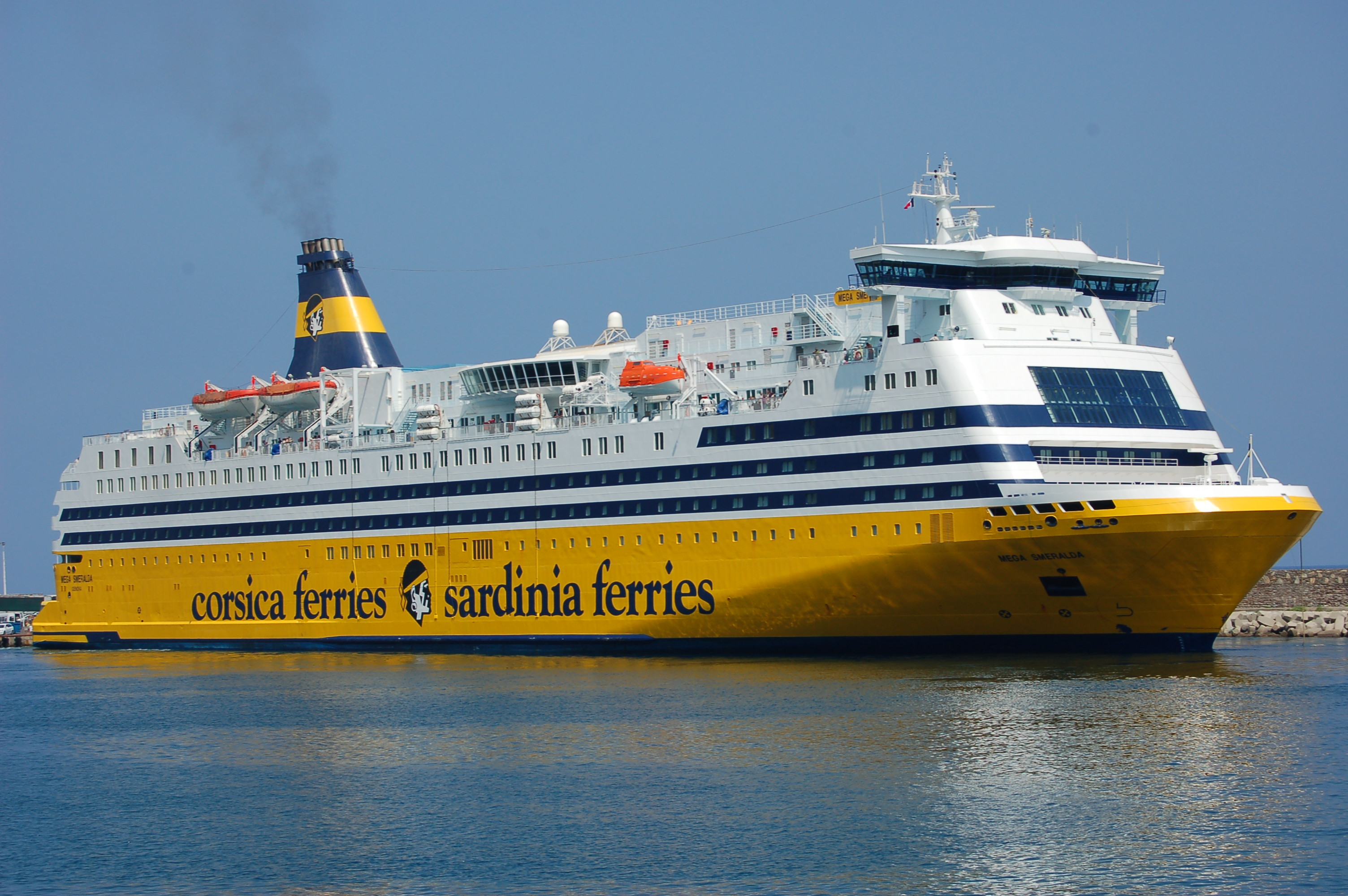
A ferry, Mega Smeralda

=== Passenger ship types ===
There are several types of passenger ships:

Cruise passenger count has increased about 7-fold since 1990, interrupted by the COVID-19 pandemic.

1. Ocean liners: Ocean liners typically are passenger or passenger-cargo vessels transporting passengers and often cargo on longer line voyages. An ocean liner is the traditional form of passenger ship. Once such liners operated on scheduled line voyages to all inhabited parts of the world. With the advent of airliners transporting passengers and specialized cargo vessels hauling freight, line voyages have almost died out. But with their decline came an increase in sea trips for pleasure and fun, and in the latter part of the 20th century ocean liners gave way to cruise ships as the predominant form of large passenger ship containing from hundreds to thousands of people, with the main area of activity changing from the North Atlantic Ocean to the Caribbean Sea.
2. Ferries: Ferries are vessels for day to day or overnight short-sea trips moving passengers and vehicles (whether road or rail). Many modern ferries, such as Stena Germanica, employ a RoRo (Roll-On-Roll-Off) system to transport these vehicles. There also exist cruise ferries, designed for longer routes, lasting from one to a couple of days. They are named such because they tend to include amenities common on cruise ships, such as pools, discos, and spas.
3. Cruise ships: Cruise ships mainly transport passengers on round-trips, in which the trip itself and the attractions of the ship and ports visited are the principal draw. For a long time, cruise ships were smaller than the old ocean liners had been, but in the 1980s, this changed when Knut Kloster, the director of Norwegian Caribbean Lines, bought one of the biggest surviving ocean liners, the SS France, and transformed her into a huge cruise ship, which he renamed the SS Norway. Her success demonstrated that there was a market for large cruise ships. Successive classes of ever-larger ships were ordered, until the Cunard liner Queen Elizabeth was finally dethroned from her 56-year reign as the largest passenger ship ever built (a dethronement that led to numerous further dethronements from the same position).

=== Cruise ships vs. ocean liners ===
Although some ships have characteristics of both types, the design priorities of the two forms are different: ocean liners value speed and traditional luxury while cruise ships value amenities (swimming pools, theaters, ball rooms, casinos, sports facilities, etc.) rather than speed. These priorities produce different designs. In addition, ocean liners typically were built to cross the Atlantic Ocean between Europe and the United States or travel even further to South America or Asia while cruise ships typically serve shorter routes with more stops along coastlines or among various islands.

Both the Queen Elizabeth 2 (QE2) (1969) and her successor as Cunard's flagship RMS Queen Mary 2 (QM2), which entered service in 2004, are of hybrid construction. Like transatlantic ocean liners, they are fast ships and strongly built to withstand the rigors of the North Atlantic in line voyage service, but both ships are also designed to operate as cruise ships, with the amenities expected in that trade. QM2 was superseded by the Freedom of the Seas of the Royal Caribbean line as the largest passenger ship ever built; however, QM2 still holds the record for the largest ocean liner. The Freedom of the Seas was superseded by the Oasis of the Seas in October 2009.

=== Measures of size ===
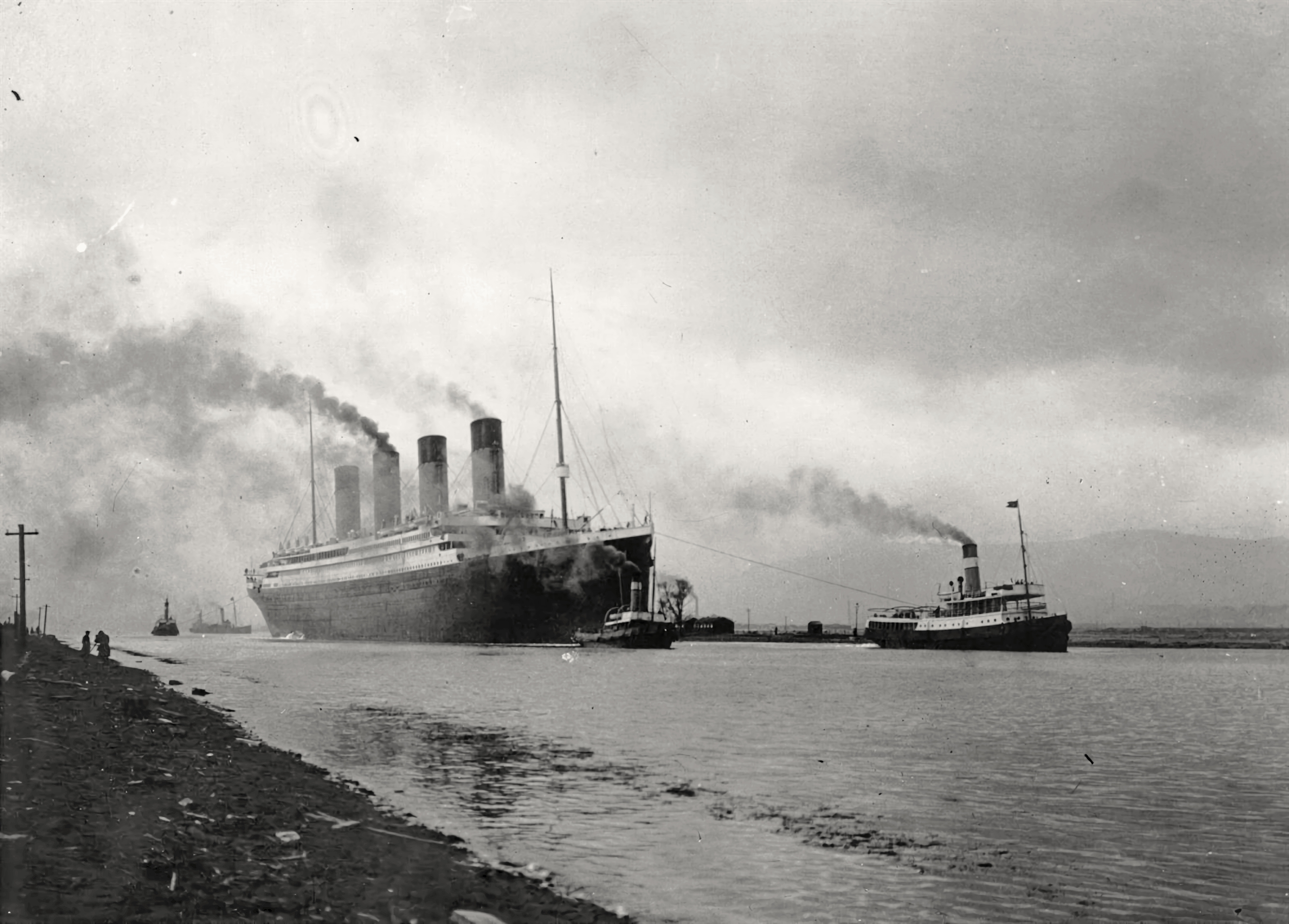
Ocean liner Titanic (1912), 46,328 GRT, 52,310 tons displacement

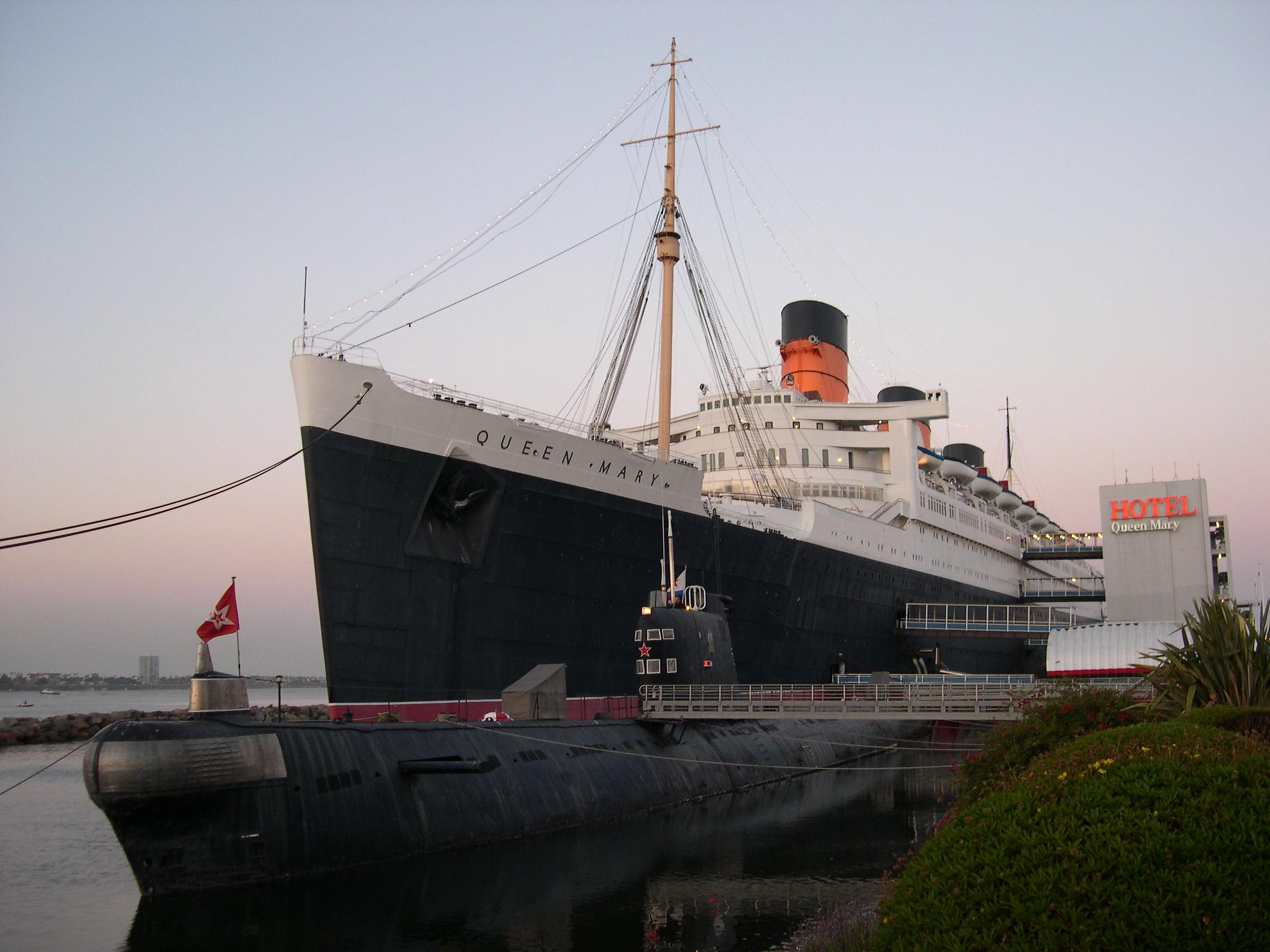
Ocean liner Queen Mary (1936), approximately 81,000 – 83,000 GRT, displacement over 80,000 tons

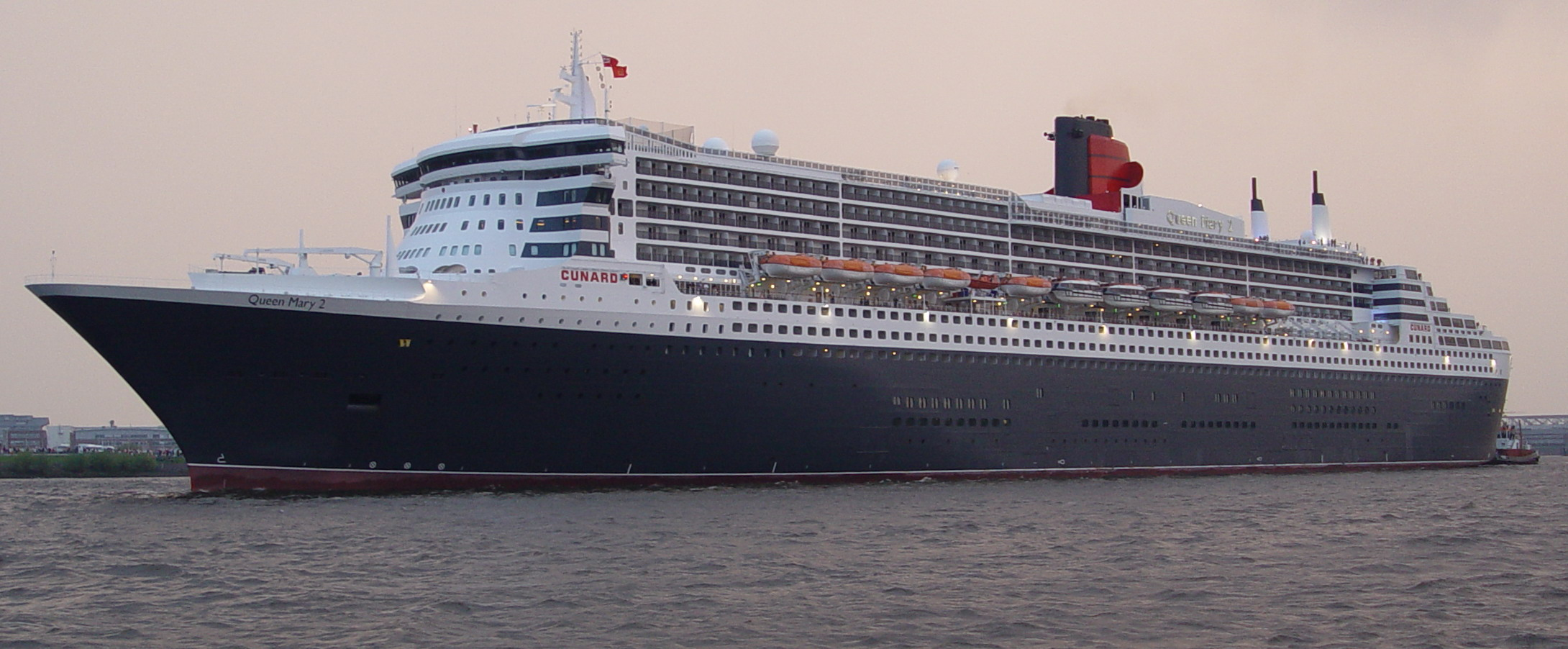
Ocean liner Queen Mary 2 (2003), 148,528 GT, approximately 76,000 tons displacement

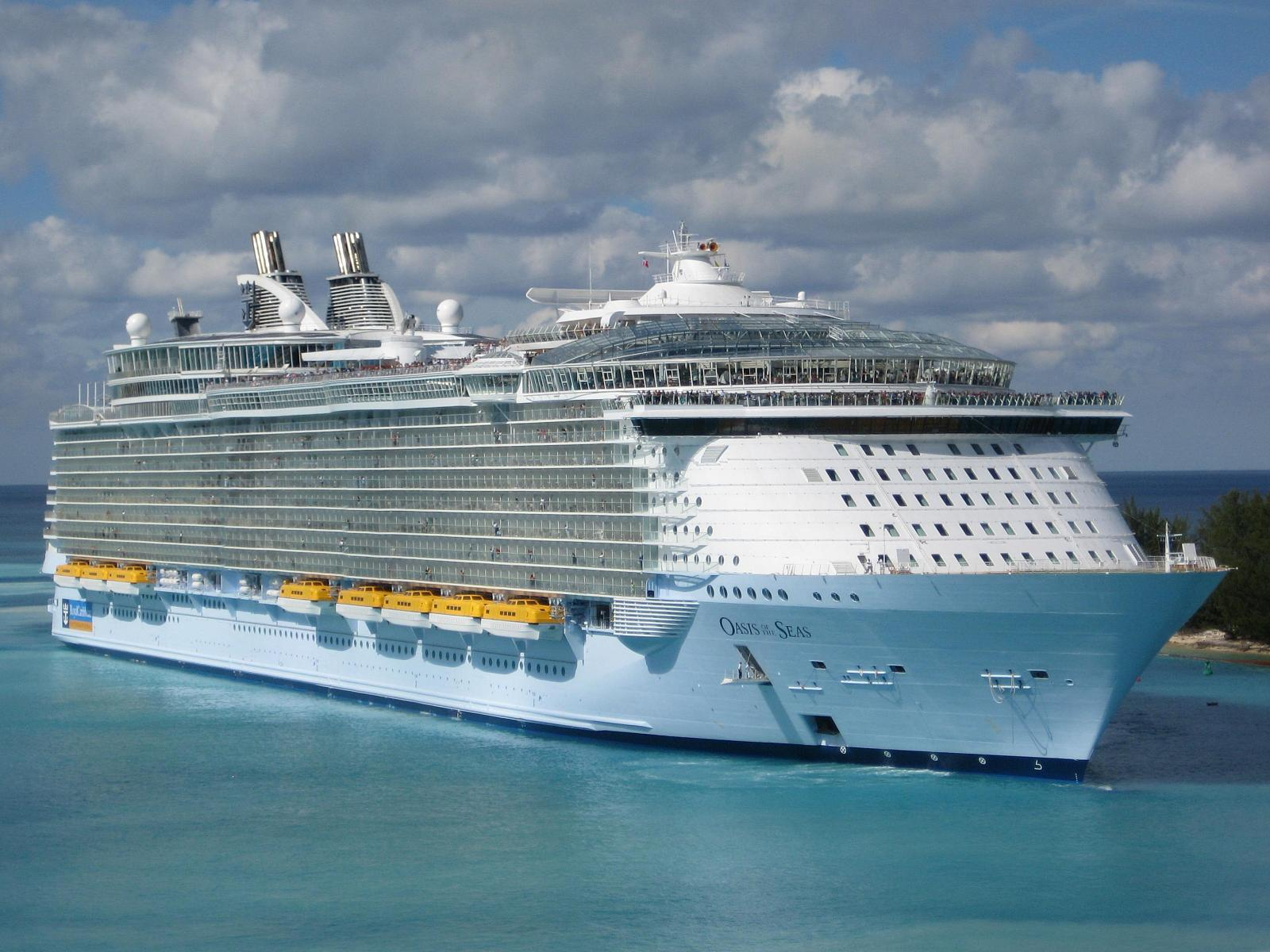
Oasis of the Seas (2009), 225,282 GT, approximately 100,000 tons displacement

Because of changes in historic measurement systems, it is difficult to make meaningful and accurate comparisons of ship sizes. Historically, gross register tonnage (GRT) was a measure of the internal volume of certain enclosed areas of a ship divided into "tons" equivalent to 100 cubic feet (2.8 m^{3}) of space. Gross tonnage (GT) is a comparatively new measurement, adopted in 1982 to replace GRT. It is calculated based on "the moulded volume of all enclosed spaces of the ship", and is used to determine things such as a ship's manning regulations, safety rules, registration fees, and port dues. It is produced by a mathematical formula, and does not distinguish between mechanical and passenger spaces, and thus is not directly comparable to historic GRT measurements. Displacement, a measure of mass, is not commonly used for passenger vessels. While a high displacement can indicate better sea keeping abilities, gross tonnage is promoted as the most important measure of size for passenger vessels, as the ratio of gross tonnage per passenger – the Passenger/Space Ratio – gives a sense of the spaciousness of a ship, an important consideration in cruise liners where the onboard amenities are of high importance.

Historically, a ship's GRT and displacement were somewhat similar in number. For example, Titanic, put in service in 1912, had a GRT of 46,328 and a displacement reported at over 52,000 tons. Similarly, Cunard Line's mid-1930s RMS Queen Mary and RMS Queen Elizabeth were of approximately 81,000 – 83,000 GRT and had displacements of over 80,000 tons.

Today, due to changes in construction, engineering, function, architecture, and, crucially, measurement system – which measures functionally all of a ship's internal volume, not just part of it – modern passenger ships' GT values are much higher than their displacements. The Cunard Queens' current successor, the 148,528 GT Queen Mary 2, has been estimated to only displace approximately 76,000 tons. With the completion in 2009 of the first of the over 225,000 GT Oasis-class cruise ships, Oasis of the Seas, passenger ships' displacements rose to 100,000 tons, well less than half their GT.

This new class is characteristic of an explosive growth in gross tonnage, which has more than doubled from the largest cruise ships of the late 1990s. This reflects the much lower relative weight of enclosed space in the comparatively light superstructure of a ship versus its heavily reinforced and machinery-laden hull space, as cruise ships have grown slab-sided vertically from their maximum beam to accommodate more passengers within a given hull size.

== Safety regulations ==
Passenger ships are subject to two major International Maritime Organization requirements : to perform musters of the passengers (...) within 24 hours after their embarkation and to be able to perform full abandonment within a period of 30 minutes from the time the abandon-ship signal is given.

Transportation Research Board research from 2019 reported passenger vessels, much more than freight vessels, are subject to degradations in stability as a result of increases in lightship weight. Passenger vessels appear to be more pressing candidates for lightship weight-tracking programs than freight vessels.

=== Design considerations ===
Passengers on ships without backup generators suffer substantial distress due to lack of water, refrigeration, and sewage systems in the event of loss of the main engines or generators due to fire or other emergency. Power is also unavailable to the crew of the ship to operate electrically powered mechanisms. Lack of an adequate backup system to propel the ship can, in rough seas, render it dead in the water and result in loss of the ship. The 2006 Revised Passenger Ship Safety Standards address these issues, and others, requiring that ships ordered after July, 2010 conform to safe return to port regulations; however, as of 2013 many ships remain in service which lack this capacity.

After October 1, 2010, the International Convention for the Safety of Life at Sea (SOLAS) requires passenger ships operating in international waters to either be constructed or upgraded to exclude combustible materials. It is believed that some owners and operators of ships built before 1980, which are required to upgrade or retire their vessels, will be unable to conform to the regulations. Fred. Olsen Cruise Line's Black Prince, built in 1966 was one such ship, but was reported to be headed for inter-island service in Venezuelan waters.

=== External safety measures ===
The International Ice Patrol was formed in 1914 after the sinking of the Titanic to address the long-outstanding issue of iceberg collision.

=== Other regulations ===
Passengers and their luggage at sea are covered by the Athens Convention.
