= MS Volendam =

Dutch Ocean Liner & Cruise Ship, launched 1998

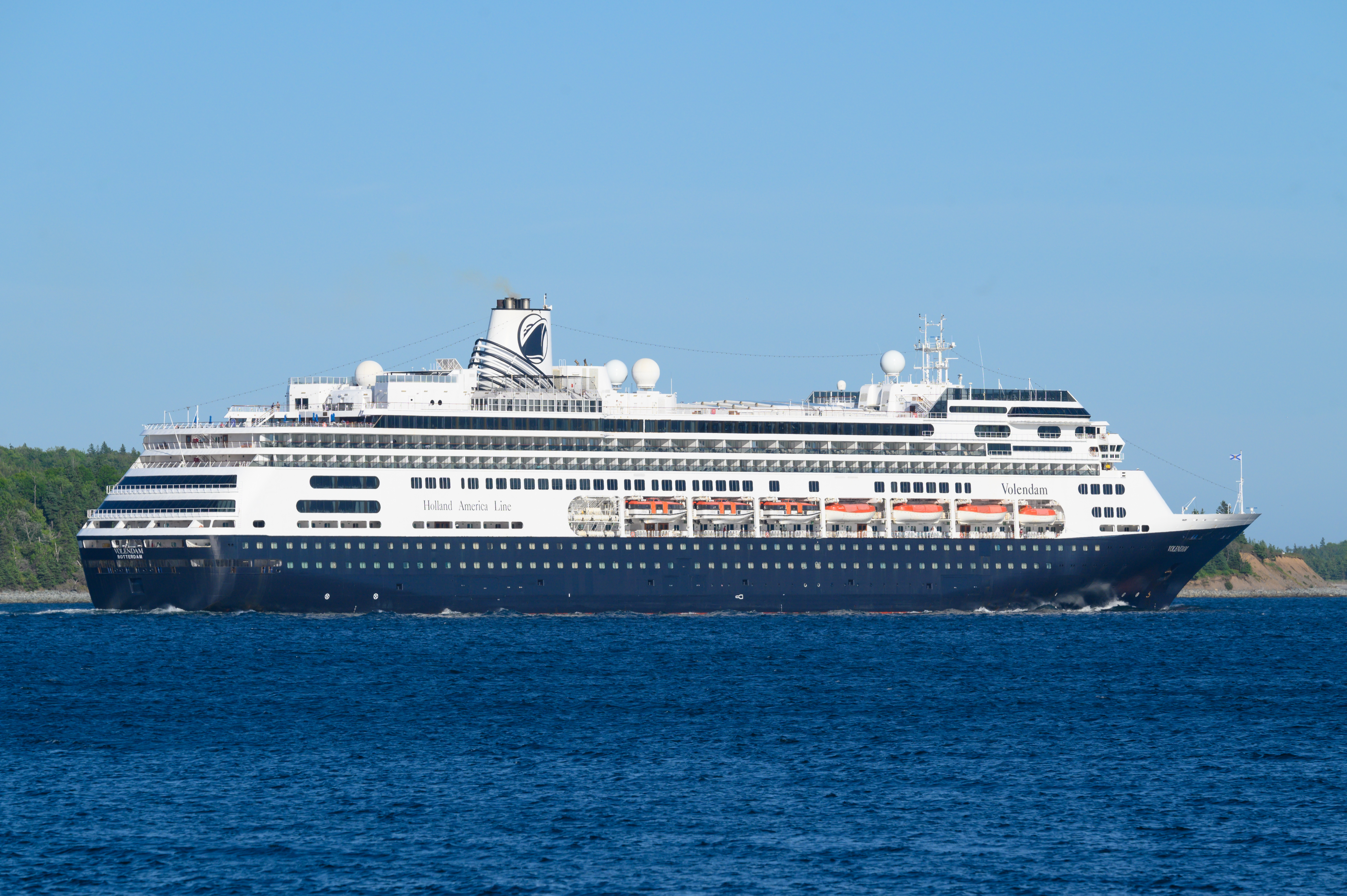
- MS Volendam in Halifax, Canada 2024

History

Netherlands
- Name: Volendam
- Owner: Carnival Corporation & plc
- Operator: Holland America Line
- Port of registry: Netherlands
- Route: Global
- Ordered: 12 July 1996
- Builder: Marghera, Venice Fincantieri
- Cost: $300 Million (1999)
- Yard number: 6035
- Laid down: 27 February 1998
- Launched: 18 September 1998
- Christened: 12 November 1999
- Acquired: 25 October 1999
- Maiden voyage: November 12, 1999
- Identification: Call sign: PCHM; IMO number: 9156515; MMSI number: 245968000
- Status: Operational

General characteristics
- Class & type: Rotterdam-class (R-class) cruise ship
- Tonnage: 61,214 GT
- Length: 237.8 m (780 ft)
- Beam: 32.28 m (105.9 ft)
- Draft: 8.35 m (27.4 ft)
- Decks: 14 (10 passenger decks)
- Installed power: 43,200 kW (57,960 hp)
- Propulsion: Diesel-electric
- Speed: 26 knots (48 km/h; 30 mph)
- Capacity: 1,837 passengers
- Crew: 647

MS Volendam is a Rotterdam-class (R-class) cruise ship and Ocean Liner belonging to Holland America Line. She was built in 1999 and sails worldwide destinations for Holland America Line. She is the third ship in the fleet with that name, after SS Volendam (1922–1952) and SS Volendam (1972–1984).

== Design and construction ==
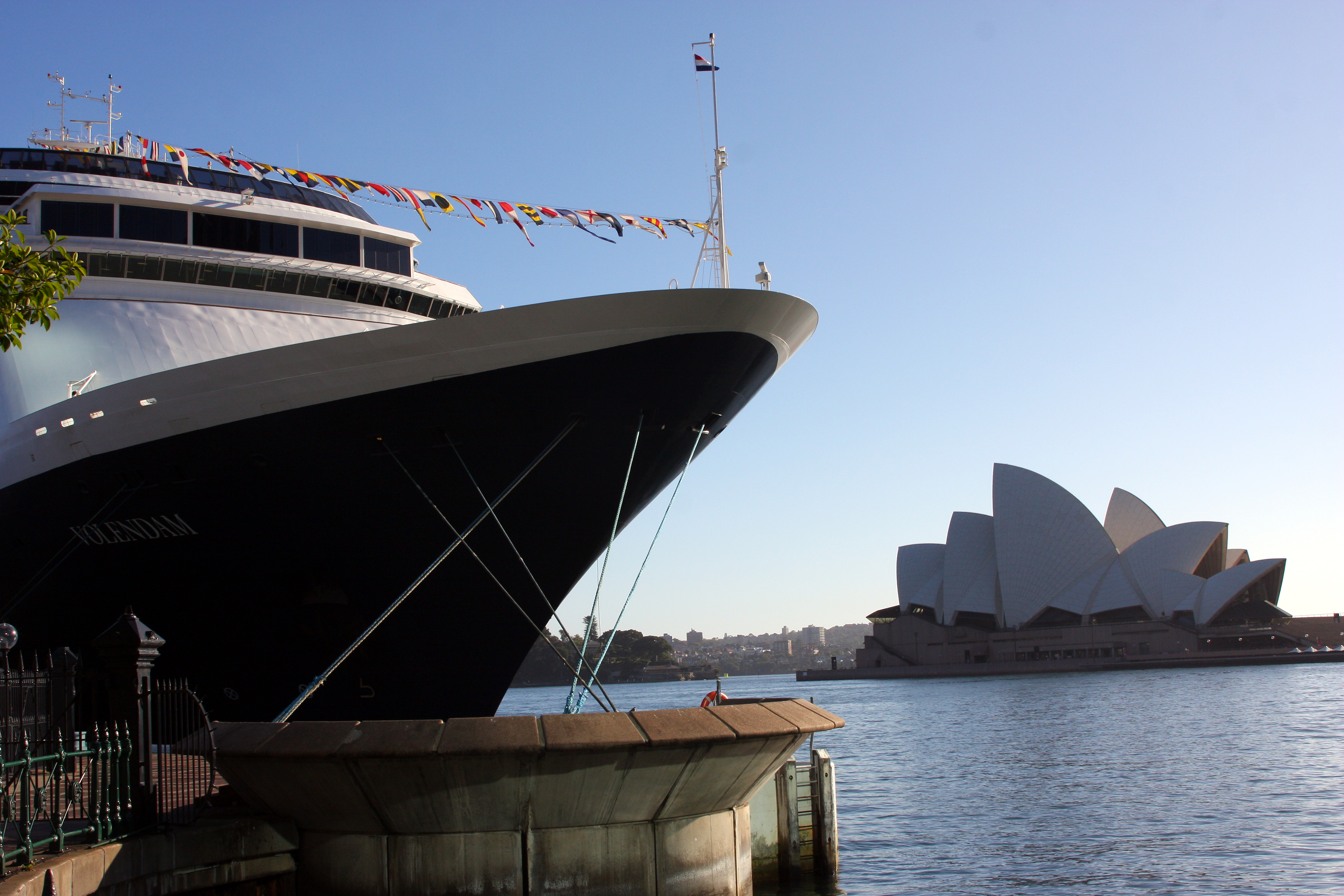
MS Volendam in Sydney Harbour.

Ordered on 12 July 1996, and was to be built by Fincantieri Cantieri Navali, at the Marghera shipyard in Venice, Italy. Volendam is a Rotterdam-class (R-class) ocean liner, a design that was built upon the previous cruise generation, the S-class ships. It shares this design with three sister ships in the Holland America Line fleet; Zaandam, Amsterdam and Rotterdam. She follows the Rotterdam, the lead ship of her class, as the second ship launched in 1999. Volendam is 237 m (778 ft) long, has a 32.3 m (106 ft) beam, and an 8.35 m (27.4 ft) draft. She has fourteen decks, and contains cabins for passengers (called staterooms) on six decks, with a ship's capacity of 1,837 guests.

The cutting of the first steel commenced on July 1, 1997, followed by the assembling of the first modules on October 13, 1997. The keel was laid on February 27, 1998. and on 18 September 1998 the coin ceremony was performed by Mrs. Carla Cherubini Testa, wife of the 2nd. manager of Fincantieri.

Original delivery was intended July 9, 1999, with a maiden voyage on July 29, 1999, going to the Canadian Maritimes. This was later postponed 24 August 24, 1999. On May 10, 1999, it was announced that both the Volendam and Zaandam were delayed, due to previous delays on shipyard newbuildings and strikes. The ship is delivery was moved to October 15, 1999, with a maiden voyage set for November 12, 1999. The Maasdam took over the initial planned maiden Canadian Maritime cruises.

The ship's design theme is flowers, and she features floral designs throughout. The atrium contains a sculpture spanning three decks which was created by Luciano Vistosi.

== Service history ==
The Volendam was christened by former professional tennis player Chris Evert on November 12, 1999, who acted as the ship's godmother. The ship sailed on her maiden voyage for a 10-day Caribbean voyage from Ft. Lauderdale.

On October 5, 2002, the Volendam became the biggest ship ever to sail under the Rainbow Bridge in Tokyo, Japan while on her first Orient cruise. In 2005 the ship was used as a floating hotel in Jacksonville, Florida for Super Bowl XXXIX.

Volendam was refitted in 2006, with the top portion of its superstructure was extended forward to allow the expansion of the spa and gym area above the bridge along with a children's room added aft of the funnel.

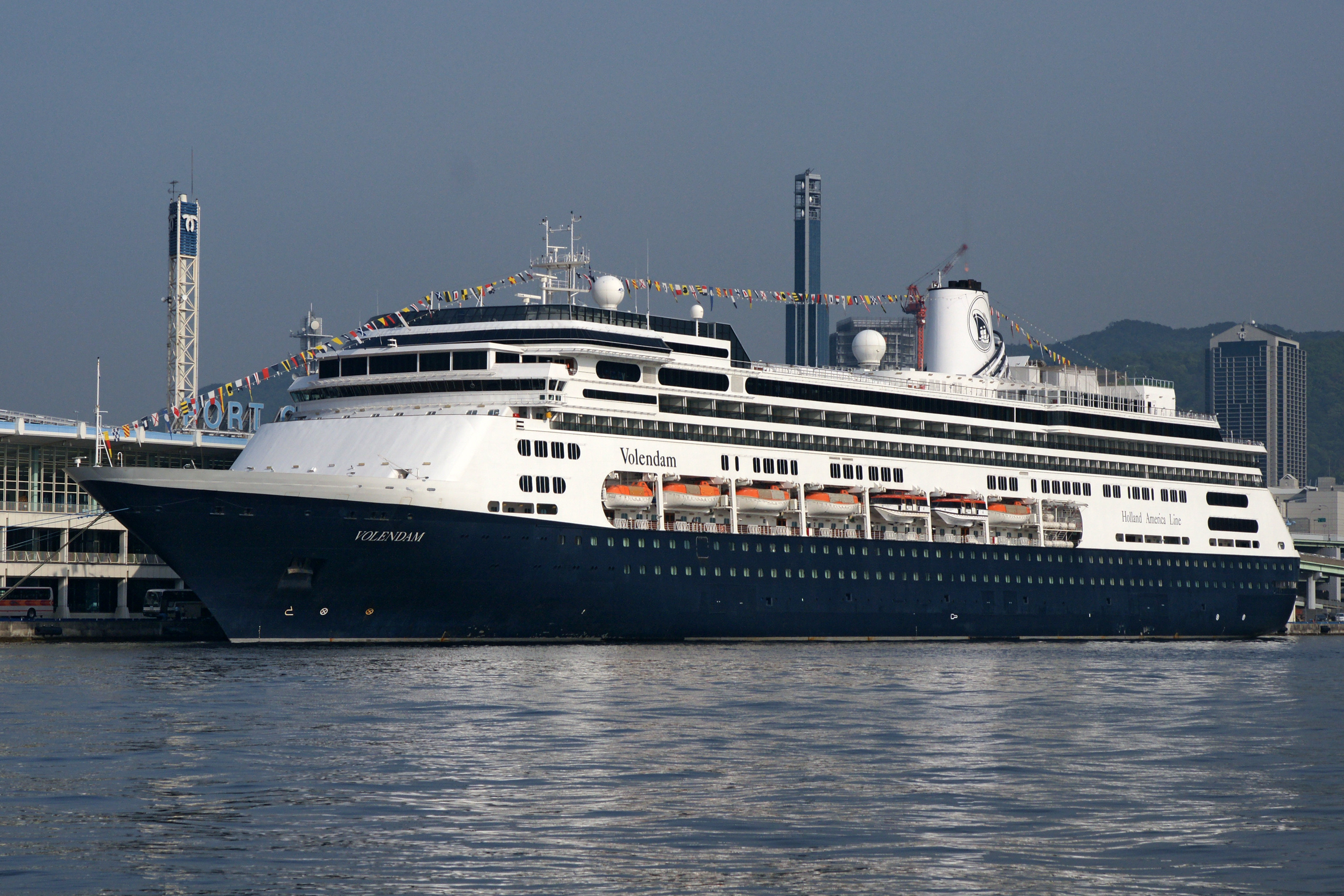
MS Volendam at Kobe Port Terminal in 2009

Volendam first entered the Australian market in 2009. A visit to Batemans Bay during a trip circumnavigating Australia in 2010 was cancelled with 48 hours' notice due to "operational issues" which was interpreted by local media as a failure by the town's council to meet the requirements set out by Holland America regarding the town's wharf some twelve months prior to the expected arrival of the ship. During 2011 she was chartered to visit match relevant destinations during the 2011 Rugby World Cup, which was hosted in New Zealand.

=== 2014 refit ===
In 2014, the ship was renovated with the transformation of the Casino Bar, the Piano Bar and the Seaview Lounge into an area called The Mix that included a new wine and martini bar. The Explorer's lounge was also reconfigured into an open floor plan. On the promenade deck, 21 existing outside passenger cabins were transformed into new lanai staterooms with large sliding glass doors, along new bathroom fixtures and walk-in showers. All suite bathrooms were updated to feature new whirlpool bathtubs, stone vanities, lighted mirrors, fixtures, floors, walls and sinks.

In 2016, Volendam sailed out of Australia/New Zealand and South Pacific, and during the Northern Hemisphere summer has sailed out of Vancouver, Canada, conducting cruises of the Inside Passage to Alaska. She hosted an Inside Passage cruise in September 2012 to celebrate a hundred years of the Vancouver Sun. In 2013 when Volendam returned to Australian waters, she visited Kangaroo Island for the first time, after a new landing pontoon was installed on the island to allow for it to become a cruise ship destination. After she left Australia for Asia, she visited a variety of Asian countries including Japan, China, South Korea and Vietnam.

On 9 March 2016 she witnessed a total solar eclipse in the Makassar Straight while sailing through Indonesia as part of an extended tour of Asia, hosting a number of astronomy groups and eclipse followers.

In 2019, the ship received a refit in Freeport, Bahamas by SMS Group where 196 suites were renovated.

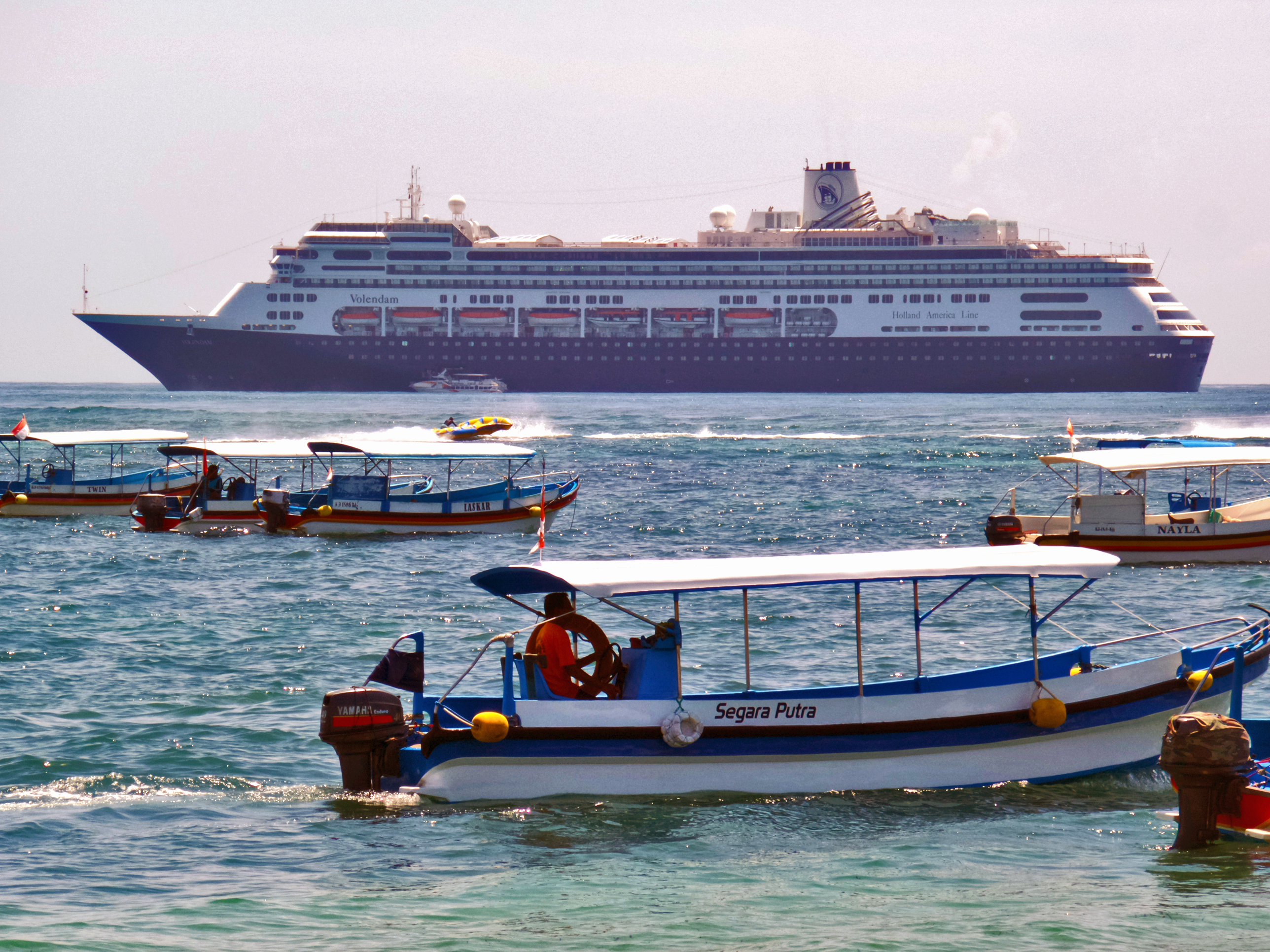
Holland America Line Volendam in Tanjung Benoa in 2016

On 20 March 2020, due to port restrictions and border closures caused by the coronavirus pandemic, Volendam was forced to return to Port Everglades in Florida two days ahead of schedule, where passengers debarked, With crew stuck on board, the ship initially remained near the coast of the Bahamas. The pause in cruising was extended multiple times and eventually scheduled to end in May 2022.

The Volendam spent 16 days in drydock in Cadiz, Spain from 9 February to 24 February 2022 following her long pause of passenger service. Design work was carried out by The SMS Group, that included minor cosmetic improvements to some of the public areas. The intent was to return the ship to service on May 15, 2022, but postponed due to a charter to the city of Rotterdam.

==== Accommodation for Ukrainian refugees ====
In May 2022, as a result of the Russian invasion of Ukraine, the City of Rotterdam chartered MS Volendam to be used as a refugee shelter for Ukrainian refugees for three months, with Holland America Line staff providing meals and services. Docked in the Merwehaven, the ship's charter was later extended to 14 September 2022. To commemorate the charter, Holland America Line will create "a permanent display with mementos and artwork created by the families, so that future Volendam guests will know about this unique time in our history". On August 30, 2022, the Volendam hosted an event on the ship at which the families thanked the City of Rotterdam, the Salvation Army and the ship's crew.

==== Second cruise ship to test biofuels ====
When completing the charter in Rotterdam, the ship became the second cruise ship to test biofuel with the company GoodFuels. The fuel test was done while the ship was docked and only using engines for the hotel load and not propulsion. "The use of a "drop-in" biofuel such as the one tested on the Volendam required no shipboard refitting or special equipment, and resulted in 78 percent decrease in lifecycle CO_{2} emissions during the final 15 days of the trial compared to marine gas oil emissions."

=== Return to service ===
On September 14, 2022, the Volendam departed Rotterdam for Trieste, Italy, where the ship will boarded guests for its first cruise since March 2020, a 14-day Holy Land & Ancient Kingdoms Explorer.

==== 2024 refit ====
In October 2024, the ship entered dry dock for a 3-week, $8 million refit in the Bahamas. This included upgrades to lower category ocean view and interior staterooms, renovation and renaming of the Explorations Cafe into the Library, Library Cafe and Game room, addition of an Art studio replacing the Queen's Room, and reconfigured retail space.

== In popular culture ==
In the 2005 film Into the Blue, Volendam makes a brief cameo when she was docked in the Prince George Wharf port of Nassau, Bahamas.
