= MS Zaandam =

Dutch Ocean Liner & Cruise Ship, launched in 1999

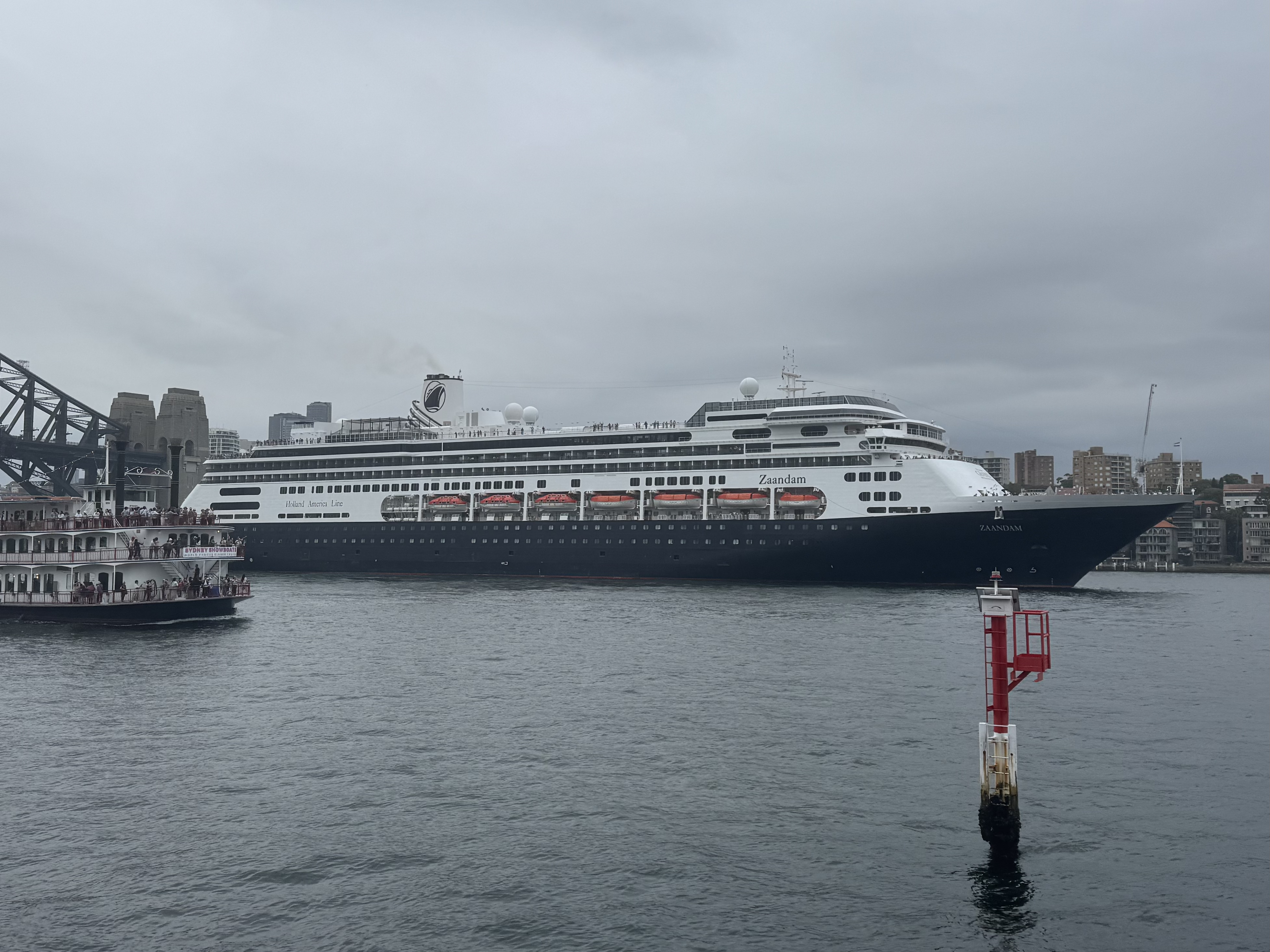
- Zaandam departing Sydney, Australia on 7 March 2026

History
- Name: Zaandam
- Owner: Carnival Corporation & plc
- Operator: Holland America Line
- Port of registry: (Netherlands) Rotterdam
- Route: Pacific Ocean
- Ordered: 12 July 1997
- Builder: Fincantieri Cantieri Navali Italiana SpA, Marghera, Italy
- Cost: ~$300M (1999)
- Yard number: 6036
- Laid down: 26 June 1998
- Launched: 29 April 1999
- Christened: 24 May 2000
- Completed: 6 April 2000
- Acquired: 6 April 2000
- Maiden voyage: 24 May 2000
- In service: 24 May 2000
- Identification: Call sign PDAN; IMO number: 9156527; MMSI no: 246442000
- Status: Operating

General characteristics
- Class & type: Rotterdam-class ship
- Tonnage: 61,396 GT; 31,457 NT; 6,150 DWT
- Length: 237.8 m (780 ft 2 in)
- Beam: 32.28 m (105 ft 11 in)
- Draught: 8.35 m (27 ft 5 in)
- Decks: 14 decks (10 passenger-accessible)
- Installed power: 42,000 kW (56,000 hp)
- Propulsion: Diesel-electric; 2 × Variable-pitch propellers
- Speed: 26 knots (48 km/h; 30 mph)
- Capacity: 1,837 passengers
- Crew: 647

MS Zaandam is a cruise ship and ocean liner owned and operated by Holland America Line, named for the city of Zaandam, Netherlands, near Amsterdam. She was built by Fincantieri in Marghera, Italy and delivered in 2000. Zaandam is part of the Rotterdam class and a sister ship to Volendam, the former Rotterdam, and former Amsterdam.

The ship was denied access to the Panama Canal and then to Fort Lauderdale after an outbreak of COVID-19 early in the 2020 pandemic. Four passengers and crew died of COVID-19 during or after that voyage.

== Design and description ==
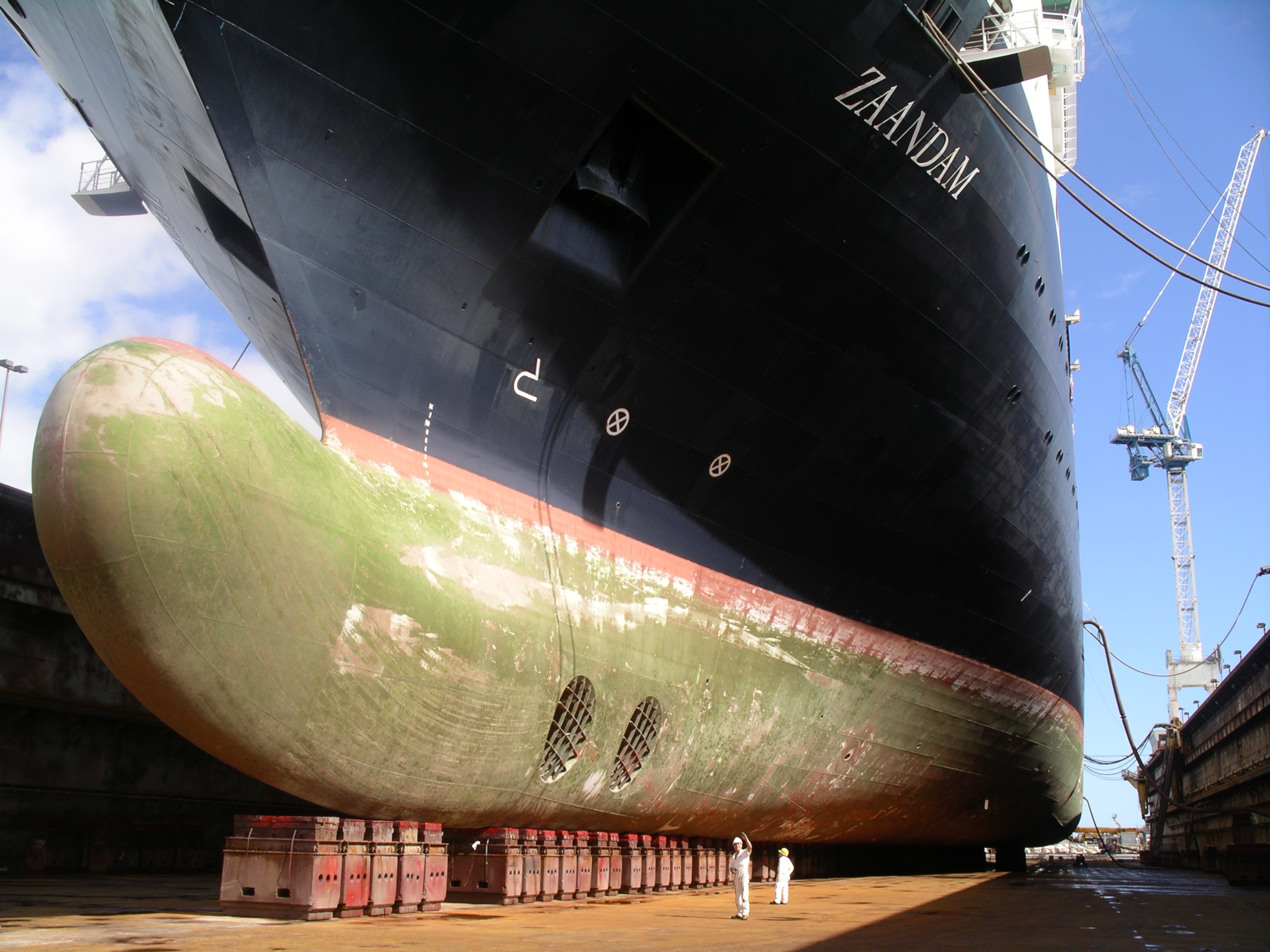
Zaandam's bulbous bow

The ship has a 61,396 gross tonnage (GT), a 31,224 net tonnage (NT) and measures 7,321 tons deadweight (DWT). The ship is 237.7 metres (780 ft) long with a beam of 32.4 metres (106 ft 5 in) and a draught of 8.3 metres (27 ft 1 in). (Note: Holland America has the beam at 32.2 metres (105 ft 8 in), while Equasis has the deadweight tonnage at the original 6,150.) As built the vessel had a GT of 60,906 and DWT 6,150. As built Zaandam was 237 metres (777 ft 7 in) long overall and 202.8 metres (665 ft 4 in) between perpendiculars with a beam of 32.3 metres (106 ft 0 in). The vessel is powered by a diesel-electric system turning two propeller shafts creating 37,500 kilowatts (50,300 hp). This gives Zaandam a maximum speed of 26 knots (48 km/h; 30 mph).

The vessel can accommodate 1,837 passengers and 674 crew at maximum occupancy. (Note: Ward has the crew numbering 650.) The 716 cabins range in size from 10.5–104.6 m^{2} (113–1,126 sq ft), of which 197 have a balcony. Zaandam has a musical theme, and is decorated with artefacts and memorabilia from different musical genres, such as a Baroque-style Dutch pipe organ and guitars signed by the Rolling Stones, Carlos Santana and Queen. One of the center stairways has a saxophone signed by former United States President Bill Clinton on the mouthpiece. A total of 10 decks are accessible to passengers (with the top-most split in the middle to accommodate the Lido deck pool skylight and the "A" deck having only the port/starboard tender ship docks accessible), 5 of which contain cabins. The Lower Promenade Deck (Deck 3) has an exterior walkway along the ship's circumference, excluding the bow section.

== Construction and career ==
The ship was constructed by Fincantieri Cantieri Navali Italiana SpA at Marghera, Italy with the yard number 6036 and the keel was laid down on 26 June 1998. The vessel was launched on 29 April 1999 and completed on 6 April 2000. Zaandam was christened by Mary-Kate and Ashley Olsen in May 2000. The ship is registered in the Netherlands and owned and operated by the Holland America Line.

Zaandam formerly sailed through Canada and New England during the summer and during the winter sails Mexico and Hawaii. In December and January, Zaandam cruises the Antarctic and South America.

On 24 June 2018, the U.S. Centers for Disease Control and Prevention reported that 73 people became ill on Zaandam in a norovirus outbreak en voyage from Seattle, Washington to Alaska.

On 1 July 2024, the main-belt asteroid (277118) Zaandam, discovered by Andrew Lowe in 2005, was named in honor of the vessel. The citation reads:

The cruise ship MS Zaandam encountered the total solar eclipse of April 8, 2024 off the west coast of Mexico. In spite of weather challenges, the skill and expertise of Captain Ane Smit, his officers, and crew ensured that the discoverer of this minor planet and the other passengers onboard successfully observed the eclipse.

=== Coronavirus pandemic ===
On 7 March 2020 Zaandam departed Buenos Aires, Argentina, sailing for San Antonio, Chile with 1,243 passengers and 586 crew. By 14 March 13 passengers and over 100 crew members had fallen ill with "flu-like symptoms." She became stranded off the coast of Chile after being denied entry. By 24 March, the vessel was sailing for Port Everglades, a cruise-liner port in Florida, United States. The number of sick people aboard had risen to 77. Holland America dispatched sister ship Rotterdam to aid the ship by bringing supplies, additional medical staff, and COVID-19 tests, and also with the intention of transferring healthy passengers onto Rotterdam.

On 27 March, Zaandam was denied transit through the Panama Canal due to the number of sick people on board. Four passengers died while waiting for permission to transit the Panama Canal with the number of sick aboard climbing to 148. On 28 March 2020, Zaandam and Rotterdam were cleared by the Panama Department of Health to transit the Panama Canal. Some passengers from Zaandam transferred to the Rotterdam. Rotterdam followed Zaandam through the Panama Canal on her way to Port Everglades, in Fort Lauderdale, Florida. At that time, the crew of Zaandam included four physicians and four nurses while Rotterdam's roster included two physicians and four nurses.

By 31 March 2020, the number reported as being "ill" had increased to 193. Rotterdam had taken almost 1,400 symptom-free people from Zaandam, leaving 450 passengers and 602 crew members on her sister ship.

By 30 March 2020, Holland America did not receive permission to dock either vessel at Fort Lauderdale as planned. The city's mayor, Dean Trantalis, "said he didn't want the ship to dock near his city, at least without extensive precautions." The Florida state governor, Ron DeSantis, was also hesitant to accept Zaandam at Fort Lauderdale, and declined to make a decision on 31 March 2020. The president of Holland America made a public plea for acceptance of the ship and expressed concern that various ports in several countries had been reluctant to provide provisions and medical supplies.

In a 30 March press conference, the state governor suggested that the best solution might be to send medical assistance to the ship. On 1 April, the governor announced that only residents of Florida could disembark when the ship arrived. 190 passengers and crew reported "flu-like" symptoms and eight had tested positive for COVID-19.

US President Donald Trump said on 1 April 2020 that "we have to help the people" [on the ships] and that discussions were under way with Canada and the United Kingdom about them "arranging flights to retrieve their citizens from the ship." After the ship was allowed to dock, nine passengers were taken to local hospitals, but 45 others who were ill were required to remain on board, receiving medical care, until they fully met "the CDC guidelines for being fit to travel." Crew from both ship were not permitted to disembark. The cruise line sought to arrange for passengers from other countries to leave Florida on chartered aircraft.

By 4 April, "14 critically ill people" were admitted to local hospitals, while the others were allowed to disembark when flights to their destinations were available. A fourth person, one of the crew, died in hospital on 10 April. As a result of the pandemic, Zaandam was taken out of active service.

In August 2021, Holland America Line announced Zaandam would return to cruising the Canada/New England region in May 2022.

External videos
- Q&A interview with Michael Smith and Jonathan Franklin on Cabin Fever, July 24, 2022, C-SPAN

A book about Zandaam was published in June 2022 titled Cabin Fever: The Harrowing Journey of a Cruise Ship at the Dawn of a Pandemic, by Michael Smith and Jonathan Franklin.

== Sources ==
- "Zaandam (9156527)". Equasis. Ministry of Ecology, Sustainable Development and Energy.
- "Fast Fact Sheet – MS Zaandam" (PDF). Holland America. Archived from the original (PDF) on 12 July 2011.
- "Zaandam (9156527)". Miramar Ship Index.
- Ward, Douglas (2019). Berlitz Complete Guide to Cruising & Cruise Ships 2020 (28th ed.). Singapore: Berlitz. ISBN 978-1-78573-250-8.
