= MS Bolette =

Cruise ship

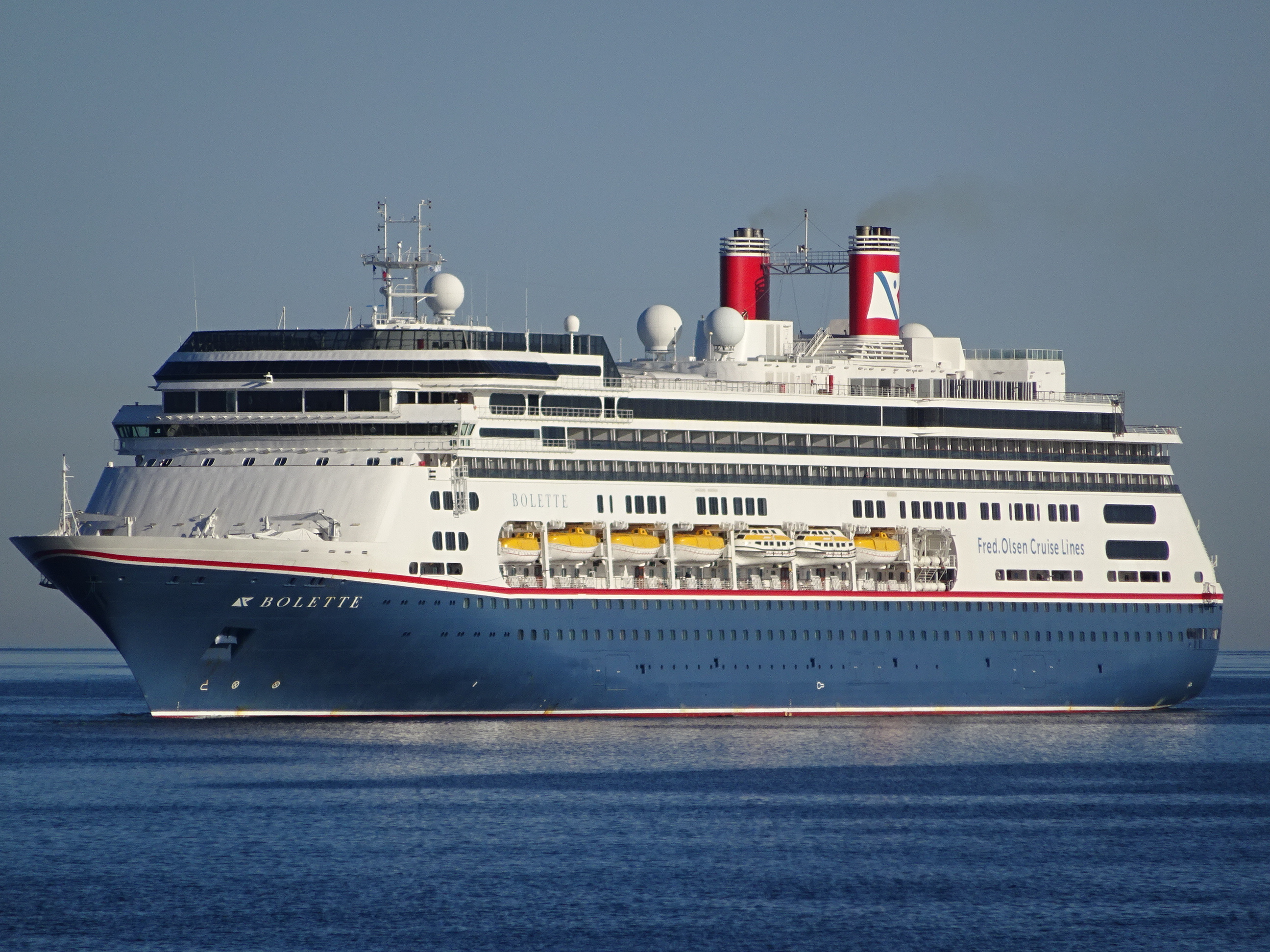
- Bolette underway in Tallinn Bay, 7 May 2023.

History

Bahamas
- Name: Amsterdam 1 (2000); Amsterdam (2000–2020); Bolette (2020–present)
- Owner: Carnival Corporation & plc (2000–2020); Fred. Olsen & Co. (2020–present)
- Operator: Holland America Line (2000–2020); Fred. Olsen Cruise Lines (2020–present)
- Port of registry: Bahamas, Nassau
- Builder: Fincantieri (Italy)
- Cost: US$400 million
- Yard number: Venice 6052
- Launched: 4 January 2000
- Maiden voyage: 30 October 2000
- In service: October 2000
- Identification: Call sign C6ES3; IMO number: 9188037; MMSI number: 311000986
- Status: Operational

General characteristics
- Class & type: Rotterdam-class (R-class) cruise ship
- Tonnage: 62,735 GT; 30,766 NT; 7,327 DWT
- Length: 238.0 m (780 ft 10 in)
- Beam: 32.28 m (105 ft 11 in)
- Draught: 8.3 m (27 ft 3 in)
- Decks: 14 decks
- Deck clearance: 26.7 m (87 ft 7 in)
- Ramps: 1
- Installed power: 37,500 kW (50,300 hp)
- Propulsion: Diesel-electric; two ABB Azipod units (15.5 MW each)
- Speed: 28 knots (52 km/h; 32 mph)
- Capacity: 1,686
- Crew: 647

MS Bolette is a cruise ship and ocean liner owned and operated by Fred. Olsen Cruise Lines. It was launched in 2000 as MS Amsterdam for Holland-America Line, and is the fourth and final ship in the Rotterdam Class, with her sister ships being MS Rotterdam, MS Volendam and MS Zaandam.

The ship features two swimming pools, one of which has a retractable magrodome, a spa, fitness center, theater, casino, and several lounges and dining venues, such as the two-story dining room situated at the aft of the ship, featuring panoramic wake view windows.

The ship is 238 meters long by 32.3 meters wide, with a draft of 8.3 meters. The bow is characterized by a very sharp, knife-like and raked entry, typical of ships in this class. The ship has two thrusters near the bow, and two azipods powering the ship, which also replaced the two aft thrusters found on the earlier sisters.
