= MV Black Prince =

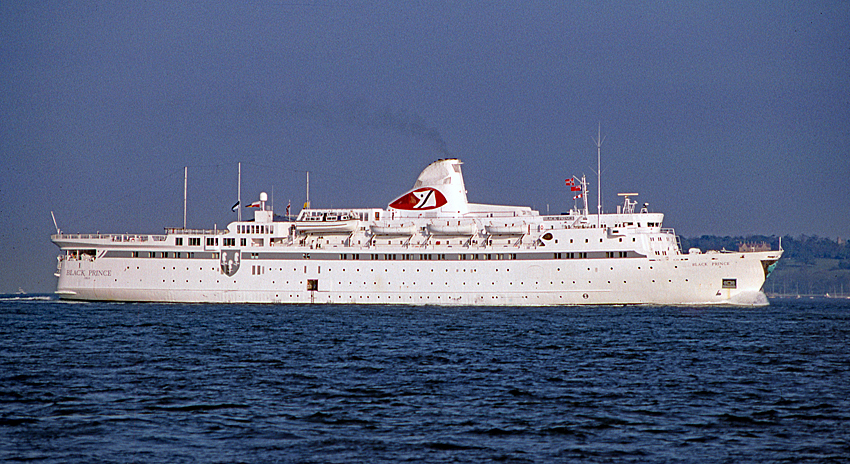
- Black Prince in The Solent, April 1990

History
- Name: 1966–2009: Black Prince; 1970–1985: (summers): Venus; 2009–2013: Ola Esmeralda
- Owner: Fred. Olsen & Co.
- Operator: 1966–1986: Fred. Olsen Lines/Fred. Olsen Cruise Lines; 1970–1983 (summers): BDS; 1983–1985 (summers): DFDS; 1985 (summer): Norway Line; 1987-2010: Fred. Olsen Cruise Lines; 2010-2013: Servicios Acuaticos Venezuela
- Port of registry: 1966–1986: Kristiansand, Norway; 1986–1990: Manila, Philippines; 1990–2001: Hvitsten, Norway; 2001–2009: Nassau, Bahamas; 2009–2013: Venezuela
- Builder: Flender Werke, Lübeck, West Germany
- Cost: $20 million
- Yard number: 561
- Launched: 14 May 1966
- Completed: 1966
- Acquired: October 1966
- Maiden voyage: 1966
- In service: October 1966
- Out of service: 2013
- Identification: Call sign YYLS; IMO number: 6613328; MMSI number: 775509000
- Fate: Scrapped at Santo Domingo, Dominican Republic in 2013

General characteristics (as built)
- Type: Cruise/ferry
- Tonnage: 9,499 GRT; 3,440 DWT
- Length: 141.64 m (464 ft 8 in)
- Beam: 20.02 m (65 ft 8 in)
- Draught: 6.10 m (20 ft 0 in)
- Installed power: 2 × Crossley-Pielstick 18PC2V; 12,310 kW (combined)
- Propulsion: 2 propellers
- Speed: 22.5 knots (41.7 km/h; 25.9 mph)
- Capacity: 693 passengers; 350 berths; 200 cars

General characteristics (as rebuilt, 1987)
- Type: Cruise ship
- Tonnage: 11,209 GT; 3,043 t DWT
- Length: 141.62 m (464.6 ft)
- Draught: 6.42 m (21 ft 1 in)
- Depth: 8.8 m (28 ft 10 in)
- Decks: 7 (passenger accessible)
- Speed: 18.5 knots (34.3 km/h; 21.3 mph)
- Capacity: 472 passengers
- Crew: 200
- Notes: Otherwise the same as built

Black Prince was a cruise ship, owned and operated by Fred. Olsen Cruise Lines. She was built in 1966 by the Lübecker Flender-Werke in Lübeck, West Germany for Fred. Olsen Lines for combined ferry/cruise ship operations. From 1970 until 1983 she sailed the Northern Hemisphere summer seasons on ferry service for Det Bergenske Dampskibsselskab as Venus, while returning to cruise service with Fred. Olsen for the winter seasons. In 1983 the summer ferry service was taken over by DFDS, and in 1985 it passed to Norway Line. In 1986 Fred. Olsen bought the ship outright and she was converted to a full-time cruise ship, retaining the name Black Prince.

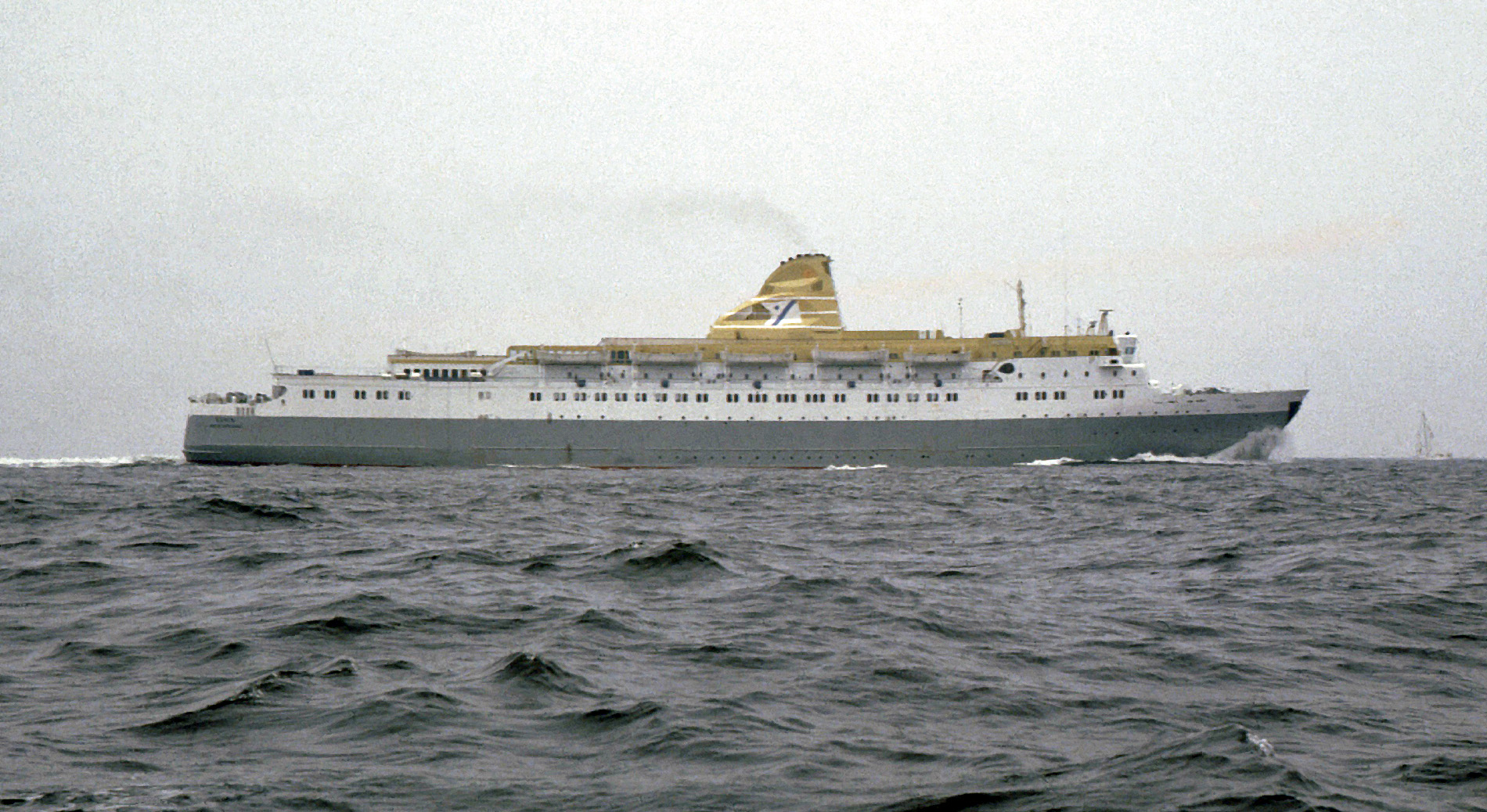
Venus in North Sea, May 1980

Black Prince was retired from the Fred. Olsen fleet on 16 October 2009. Although her withdrawal was reportedly due to the new SOLAS 2010 regulations, she was sold to SAVECA for further cruise service in Venezuelan waters under the name Ola Esmeralda. SAVECA planned to use the ship for cruises between islands within Venezuelan waters, also as a floating hotel. She was scrapped at Santo Domingo, Dominican Republic in October 2013.
