= SS Rotterdam =

Cruise ship from 1958 to 2010

Coordinates: 51°53′52″N 4°28′27″E

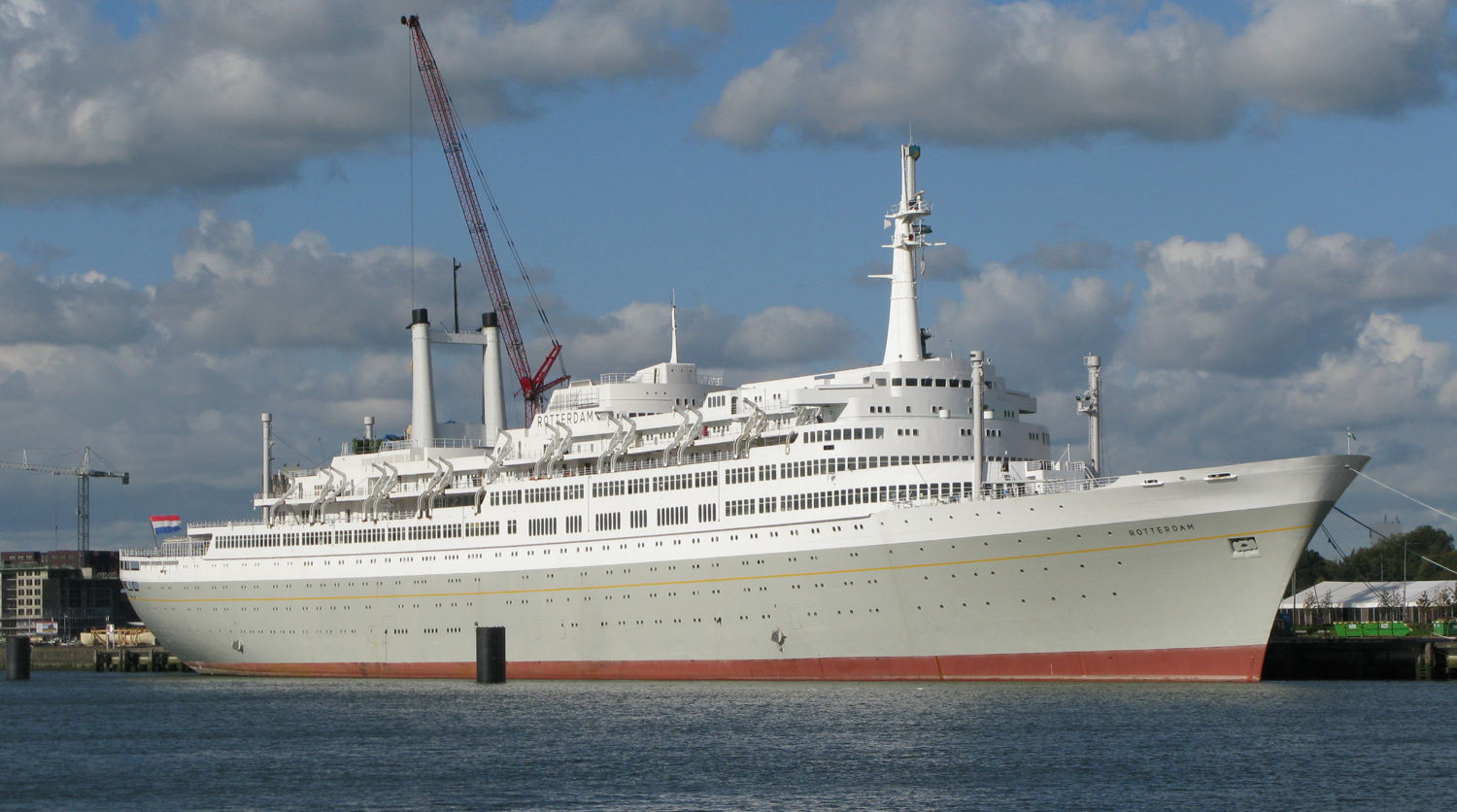
- Rotterdam in the Port of Rotterdam in 2008

History

Netherlands
- Name: Rotterdam (1959–1997); The Big Red Boat IV (1997, never entered service); Rembrandt (1997–2003); Rotterdam (2004–present)
- Namesake: Rotterdam; Rembrandt
- Owner: Holland America Line (1959–1989); Carnival Corporation (1989–1997); Premier Cruise Line (1997–2000); Donaldson, Lufkin & Jenrette (2000–2003); Rotterdam Drydock Company (2003–2005); De Rotterdam (2005–2013); WestCord Hotels (2013–present)
- Operator: Holland America Line (1959–1997); Premier Cruises (1997–2000)
- Port of registry: 1959–1973: Rotterdam, Netherlands; 1973–1997: Willemstad, Netherlands (Netherlands Antilles); 1997–2000: Nassau, Bahamas; 2000 onwards: Rotterdam, Netherlands
- Ordered: 27 October 1955
- Builder: Rotterdam Drydock Company, Rotterdam, Netherlands
- Cost: US$ 30,000,000 (1959)
- Yard number: 300
- Laid down: 14 December 1956
- Launched: 13 September 1958
- Christened: Queen Juliana
- Completed: 1959
- Maiden voyage: 3 September 1959
- In service: 1959 – 2000
- Out of service: 21 September 2000
- Identification: IMO number: 5301019
- Fate: Preserved as a hotel and museum
- Status: Permanently docked in Rotterdam, Netherlands

General characteristics
- Class & type: Ocean liner
- Tonnage: 38,645 gross tons
- Displacement: 31,530 tons
- Length: 228.0 m (748 ft)
- Beam: 28.71 m (94.1 ft)
- Height: 61 m (200.1 ft)
- Draft: 9.04 m (29.6 ft)
- Decks: 10
- Installed power: 38,000 horsepower @ 135.5 RPM
- Propulsion: 2 steam turbines manufactured by de Schelde, Vlissingen (Flushing), Netherlands 4 V2M 640PSI Boilers (3 active, 1 reserve), designed by Combustion Engineering and manufactured by de Schelde
- Speed: 21.5 kn (39.8 km/h; 24.7 mph)
- Capacity: 1,456 passengers
- Crew: 776 officers and crew

The SS Rotterdam, also known as "The Grande Dame", is a former ocean liner and cruise ship, and has been a hotel ship in Rotterdam, Netherlands, since 2010. She was launched by Queen Juliana of the Netherlands in a gala ceremony on 13 September 1958, and was completed the following summer.

The Rotterdam was the last great Dutch ship of state, employing the finest artisans from the Netherlands in her construction and fitting out process. Her career spanned forty-one years. She sailed from 1959 until her final retirement in September 2000.

== Concept and design ==
Originally she was conceived as a running mate to the popular Nieuw Amsterdam launched in 1937, but work was put on hold at the outbreak of World War II in Europe. When economic conditions once again became favorable for completion of the new ship in early 1954, the beginning of the end of ocean liners as basic transport was visible on the horizon.

The designers took this in mind and created a groundbreaking vessel, a two class, horizontally divided ship with movable partitions and a unique double staircase allowing for easy conversion to cruising. The christening and launch on 13 September 1958 by Queen Juliana was a huge crowd puller, with tens of thousands on both banks of the river. Rotterdam's machinery was shifted aft, to the now-traditional two thirds aft position, and in lieu of a funnel twin uptake pipes were fitted. To provide balance, a large deckhouse was built atop the superstructure in the midships position of a typical funnel, a very controversial arrangement at the time. Rotterdam was intended to have two funnels, similar to that of the earlier Nieuw Amsterdam.

== History ==
=== As Rotterdam ===
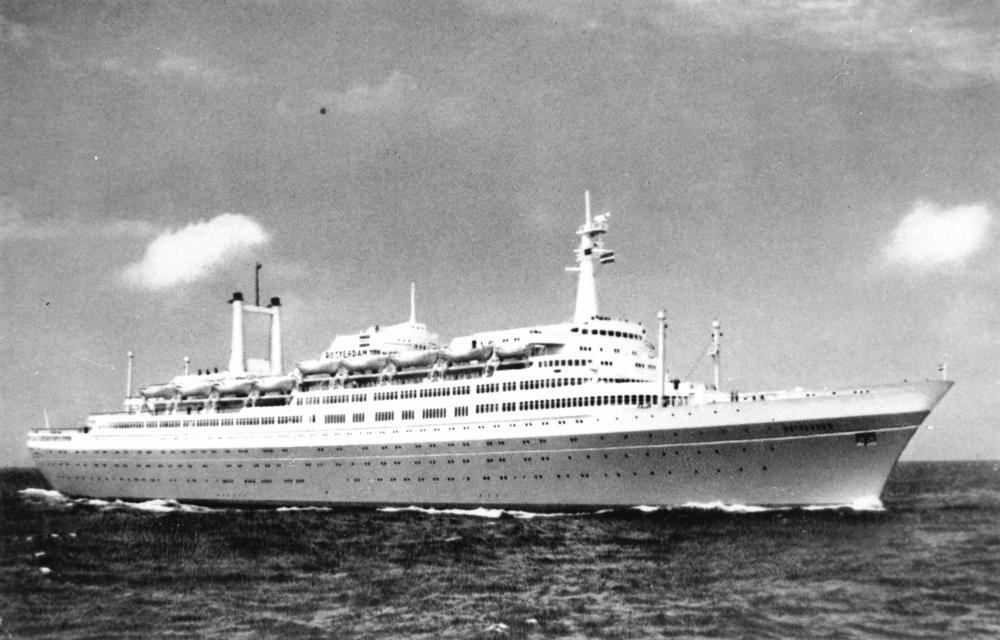
Rotterdam at sea

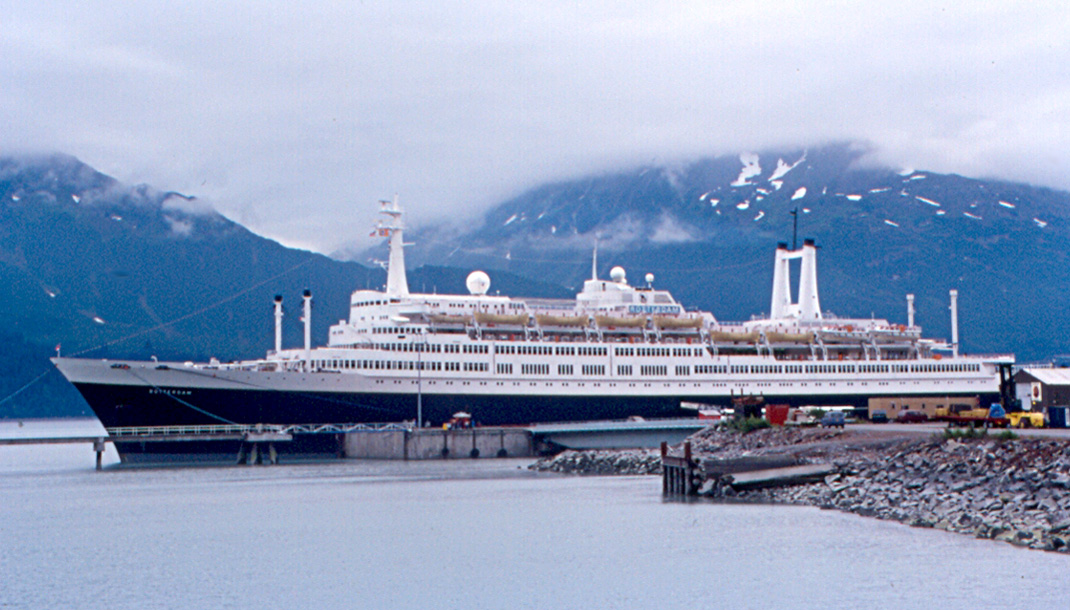
Rotterdam in Valdez, Alaska, in 1997, her last year with Holland America Line

Her sea trials and handing over to Holland America Line took place on 20 July 1959, just a few months before her maiden crossing of the Atlantic. On her maiden voyage she carried the then Crown Princess of the Netherlands to New York.

Due to the growing popularity of air travel, an increasing number of transatlantic liners began to disappear from service. This trend led to the Rotterdam's permanent retirement from transatlantic service in 1968. Subsequently, she received a small refit for permanent cruising and began her new life as a full-time cruise ship. The Rotterdam also became a one class ship after this refit.

She became increasingly popular throughout the 1970s and early 1980s, with mostly American and Australian passengers. Another refit in 1977 saw her passenger capacity decreased from 1,499 to 1,144. By the 1980s the ship had settled into a routine of winters in the Caribbean and summers in Alaska, with the occasional (and very popular) world cruise. Carnival Cruise Line took over Holland America Line in 1989.

She remained in service until 1997, when Carnival announced, much to the dismay of the ship's loyal fans, that to upgrade her to meet the new 1997 SOLAS regulations would cost 40 million dollars. While Carnival did have the money necessary to upgrade her, they had been opting to retire what they had supposedly called the "old ship." A replacement, the sixth Rotterdam, was ordered from Fincantieri, Italy. A gala finale cruise ended her final season on 30 September 1997.

There was a proposal for the Rotterdam to return to her homeport of Rotterdam where she would serve as a hotel ship, but the proposal fell through. There were also rumors of the vessel possibly being sold for scrap in Asia as what happened to the similar looking Canberra. In October 1997, she was sold to Premier Cruise Line (Premier wanted to buy the Canberra first, but P&O refused to sell her to them and sold her for scrap, thus causing Premier to buy Rotterdam instead).

=== As Rembrandt ===
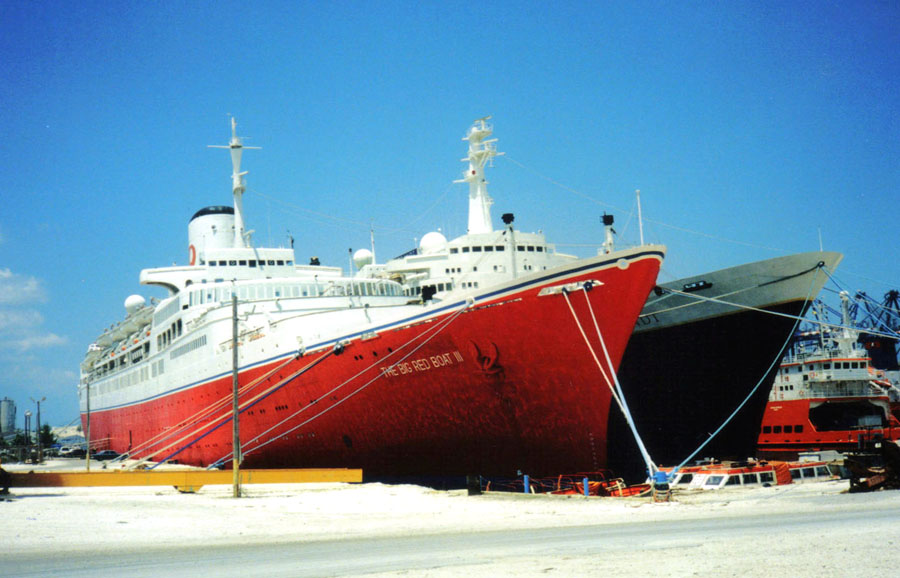
The Big Red Boat III and Rembrandt laid up in Freeport's harbor on 25 August 2001.

Originally, Premier Cruise Line wanted to rename the vessel The Big Red Boat IV, to align her with Premier's other vessels. However, public outcry caused Premier to instead renamed her SS Rembrandt after the Dutch painter. Controversially, Premier was able to refit Rembrandt for new safety regulations as well as many other things for half the amount Carnival had predicted. Her livery under Premier was the same as her HAL Livery, albeit with the Premier Cruise logo on the stern and her name changed.

She sailed for Premier along with the ex ocean liners Oceanic, Eugenio C and Transvaal Castle, all now named Big Red Boat I, II and III. She continued to serve as a fairly popular cruise ship out of Port Canaveral, Florida until 13 September 2000, when Premier Cruises shut down.

It was midnight when this was made official and the captain of Rembrandt was ordered to dock in Halifax, Nova Scotia and offload all. She was subsequently placed under arrest by the Halifax Sheriff's department until the next morning, then days later she sailed to be laid up in Freeport, Bahamas.

For three years, Rembrandt was laid up with other Premier Cruise Line vessels in Freeport, Bahamas. There were fears that she may be sold for scrap after other Premier Cruise Line fleet-mates were sold for scrap in Asia. Then in May 2003, Rembrandt was purchased by the Rotterdam Dry Dock Company (RDDC), with the plan to return the ex-Rotterdam to her homeport of Rotterdam where she would serve as a hotel ship.

== Restoration and hotel opening ==
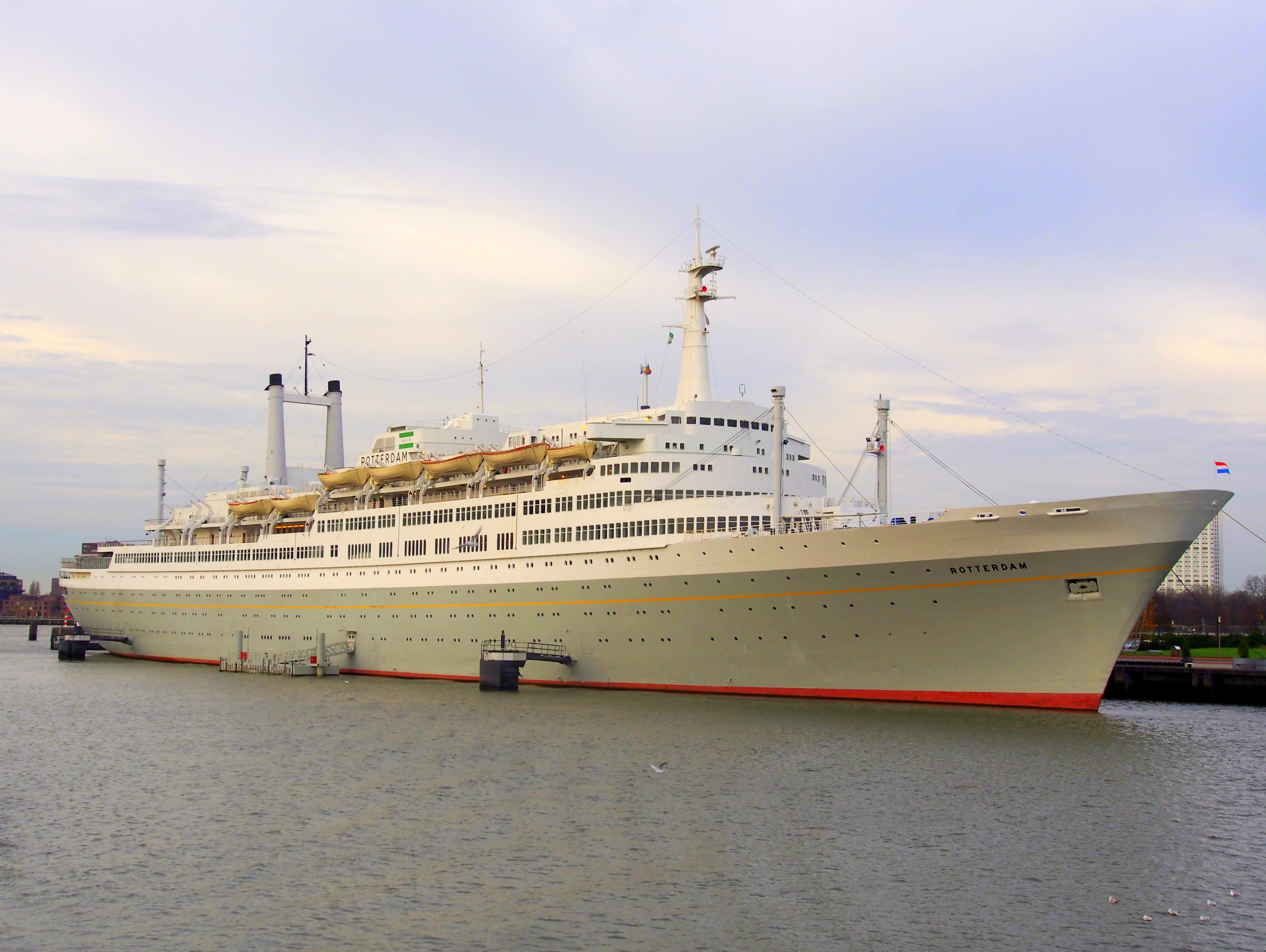
Rotterdam as she is today, permanently moored as a hotel and museum.

On 12 July 2004, Rembrandt arrived at Gibraltar, for asbestos encapsulation and removal work, which was performed by the UK-based Cuddy Group. From there, she traveled to Cadiz, where her hull was repainted its original Holland America grey, and her name was returned to the original Rotterdam. She then moved on to first Poland and then Germany for final restoration. She returned to the city of Rotterdam on 8 August 2008.

The vessel opened to the public on 15 February 2010 as a combination hotel and museum. On 12 June 2013, she was sold to WestCord Hotels, which also owns the Hotel New York located in the former Holland America Line headquarters building in Rotterdam.

Rotterdam is the last remaining ex-Premier Cruise Line vessel that is still afloat, as the former Starship Atlantic was scrapped in 2018.
