= Fred. Olsen Cruise Lines =

Norwegian-owned company based in the UK

Fred. Olsen Cruise Lines Ltd.
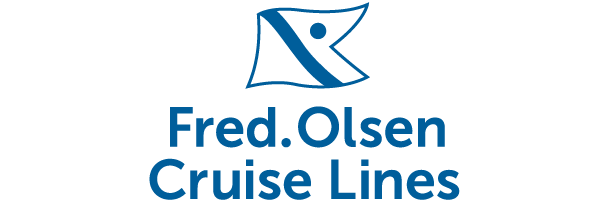
- Type: Subsidiary
- Industry: Shipping
- Founded: 1848
- Headquarters: Ipswich, United Kingdom
- Products: Cruise ships
- Parent: Bonheur
- Website: www.fredolsencruises.com

Fred. Olsen Cruise Lines is a UK-based, Norwegian-owned cruise shipping line with three cruise ships. The company is owned by Bonheur and is headquartered in Ipswich, Suffolk, in the United Kingdom. The company is part of the Fred. Olsen Group.

== History ==
The company originated in Hvitsten, a small town on Oslofjord in Norway, in 1848 by three Olsen brothers, Fredrik Christian, Petter and Andras, who bought their first ships and began an international shipping company. The company is now into the fifth generation of the family and operates various companies skilled within the cruise and passenger shipping trade, as well as aviation, ships' crewing, ship building and offshore industries. The Fred. Olsen group also has business interests in the luxury hotel sector, estate management, property development and electronics companies.

In May 2006 Fred. Olsen Cruise Lines announced the purchase of a new vessel, Norwegian Crown, from Norwegian Cruise Line. Following delivery of the vessel in November 2007, she was dry-docked for refurbishment. She was renamed Balmoral and entered service early in 2008. This was followed by a new centre section being added, with new cabins and public rooms, increasing the size from 19,000 GT to 24,000 GT (approx).

In 2018 Fred. Olsen announced that a series of 600-passenger-newbuilts was being planned and they were in negotiations with shipyards, but those newbuilts were never ordered.

In July 2020, Fred. Olsen bought the former Holland America Line ships Amsterdam and Rotterdam for $37m and renamed them Bolette and Borealis respectively, to be delivered in September 2020. They replaced the Boudicca and the Black Watch which were retired in August 2020.

In August 2022, Fredrik Olsen son Thomas Frederick Olsen Jr. would step down as head of the Fred. Olsen Cruise Ships.

== Fleet ==
=== Current fleet ===
Ship / Flag	Built	In service	Gross tonnage	Flag	Notes	Image
Balmoral	1988	2007 onwards	43,537 GT	Bahamas	former Crown Odyssey; Royal Cruise Line	
Borealis	1997	2020 onwards	61,849 GT	Bahamas	former Rotterdam; Holland America Line	
Bolette	2000	2020 onwards	62,735 GT	Bahamas	former Amsterdam; Holland America Line	

=== Former fleet ===
Ship	Built	In service	Tonnage	Notes	Fate	Image
Black Watch/Jupiter	1966	1966-2008	8,000 GRT; 11,000 GT	Built as a combination ferry/cruise ships/reefer ship.	Scrapped in 2008 as Crown A	
Black Prince	1966	1966–2009	9,499 GRT; 11,209 GT	Built as a combination ferry/cruise ship/reefer ship. Rebuilt into a cruise ship in 1987.	Scrapped in October 2013 as Ola Esmeralda.	
Blenheim	1970	1970–1981	10,427 GRT; 12,244 GT	Built by Upper Clyde Shipbuilders Ltd as a larger version of Black Prince and Black Watch combination ferry/cruise ships. Sold to Scandinavia World Cruises 1981. Burnt out 1984. Rebuilt and continued as Discovery 1.	Scrapped in 1997.	
Brabant	2006	2018–2020	1,566 GT	First river cruise for Fred Olsen. Chartered from Amadeus River Cruises between 2018 and 2020.	Laid up in Germany.	
Black Watch	1972	1996–2020	28,613 GT	Retired in 2020, after Fred. Olsen bought the former Amsterdam and Rotterdam.	Scrapped in Alang, India in 2022.	
Boudicca	1973	2005–2020	28,388 GT	Retired in 2020, after Fred. Olsen bought the former Amsterdam and Rotterdam.	Scrapped in Aliağa, Turkey in 2021.	
Braemar	1993	2001–2024	24,344 GT	Retired in 2022, sold to Villa Vie in 2024		

== Destinations and cruise holidays ==
For most of the year, the ships are based in UK ports.

Destinations include Northern Europe, the Baltic, the Mediterranean, the Adriatic, the Canary Islands, the Caribbean, Africa, Canada, the United States and South America

== Operations ==
Fred. Olsen Cruise Lines operates smaller scale cruise ships, ranging in size from 24,000 to 62,000 GT (approx), currently a fleet of three cruise ships, the ambience on board is traditionally British.

== RNLI ==
Fred. Olsen Cruise Lines is the RNLI's longest-standing corporate partner, with a history that spans more than 60 years, all starting in the 1960s, when an RNLI volunteer started fundraising on board a Fred. Olsen cruise. Since then, the generosity of Fred. Olsen's guests and crew has raised over £1 million, which has funded:–

- five Inshore Lifeboats
- three mobile training units
- three seminar rooms at RNLI College in Poole
- the development and cost of three lifeboat launching trolleys
- mobile health check kiosks for divers
- RNLI apprenticeships

== Fred. Olsen funded RNLI lifeboats ==
Op. No. (Note: Op. No. is the RNLI's Operational Number of the boat.)	Name / Class	On Station	Station	Comments
B-549	Blenwatch; B-class (Atlantic 21)	1981–1996; 1996; 1996–1997; 1997–1998; 1998–2001; 2001–2003	New Brighton; Porthcawl; Relief fleet Tighnabruaich; Relief fleet Enniskillin (Lower)	Now with ICE-SAR
C-521	Prince of Arran; C-class (Zodiac Grand Raid IV)	1988–1998	Arran (Lamlash)	
B-774	Braemar; B-class (Atlantic 75)	2001–2014; 2014; 2014–2015; 2015–2021	Relief fleet Stonehaven; Relief fleet Weymouth	
B-856	Spirit of Fred. Olsen; B-class (Atlantic 85)	2011–	Kyle of Lochalsh	
B-913	Pride of Fred. Olsen; B-class (Atlantic 85)	2019; 2019; 2019–2020; 2020–2021; 2021–2024; 2024–	Relief Fleet; Stonehaven; Relief Fleet; Filey; Berwick-upon-Tweed; Relief Fleet	
