= MS Borealis =

Cruise ship

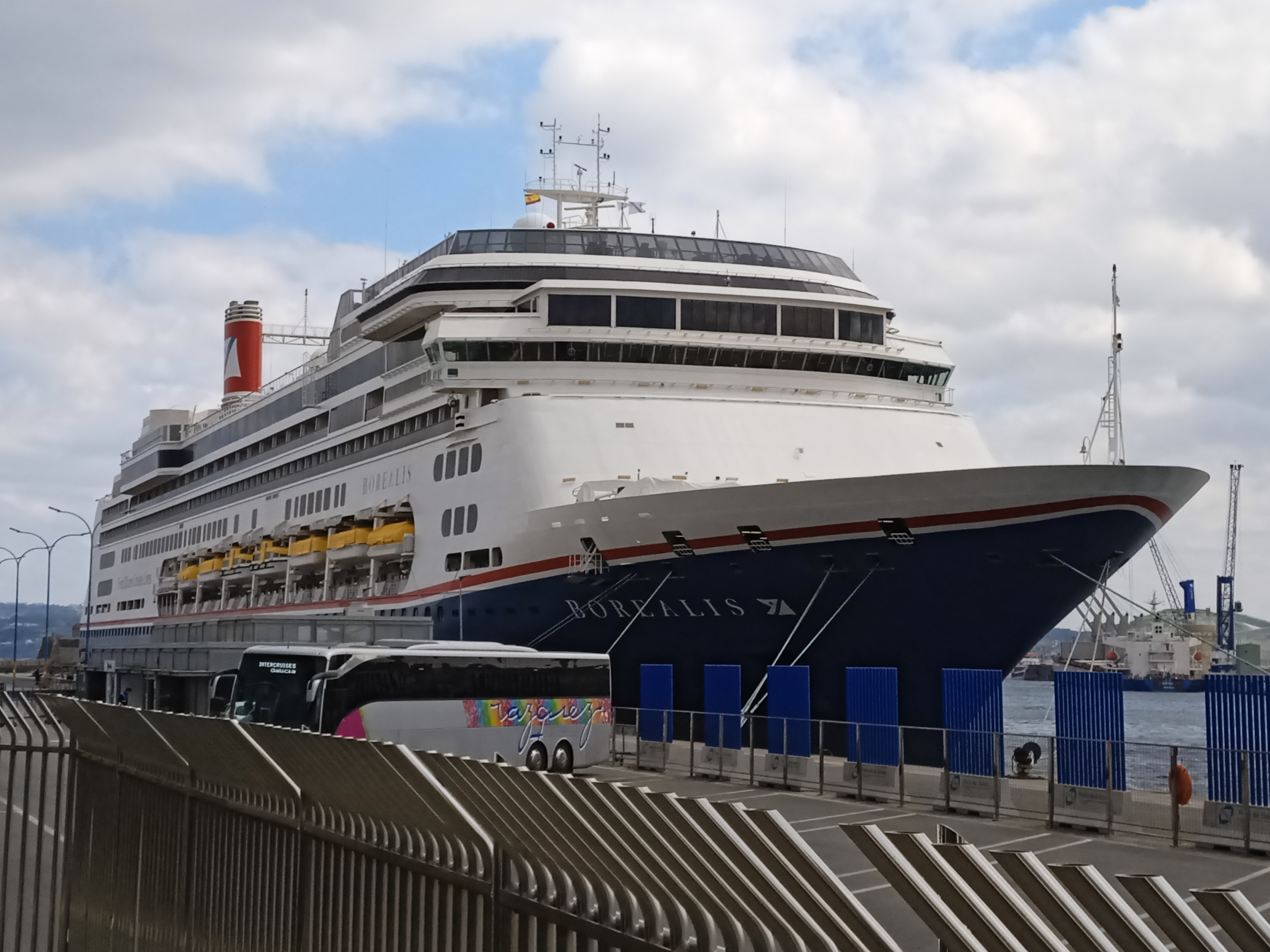
- Borealis in A Coruña, 2022

History
- Name: Rotterdam (1997–2020); Borealis (2020–present)
- Operator: Holland America Line (1997–2020); Fred. Olsen Cruise Lines (2020–present)
- Port of registry: Until 2020: Rotterdam, Netherlands. Since 2020: Bahamas
- Builder: Fincantieri, Trieste, Italy
- Yard number: 5980
- Launched: 21 December 1996
- Completed: 1997
- Maiden voyage: 11 November 1997
- In service: 11 November 1997
- Identification: Call sign: C6ES4; IMO number: 9122552; MMSI number: 246167000
- Status: In service

General characteristics
- Class & type: Rotterdam-class cruise ship
- Tonnage: 61,849 GT
- Length: 237.7 m (780 ft)
- Beam: 32.2 m (105.8 ft)
- Speed: 25 knots (46 km/h; 29 mph)
- Capacity: 1,404 passengers
- Crew: 600

Borealis is a cruise ship of Fred. Olsen Cruise Lines, sailing since July 2021. She was built as MS Rotterdam and was the co-flagship for Holland America Line, for which she operated for 22 years.

== Construction and career ==
=== As Rotterdam ===
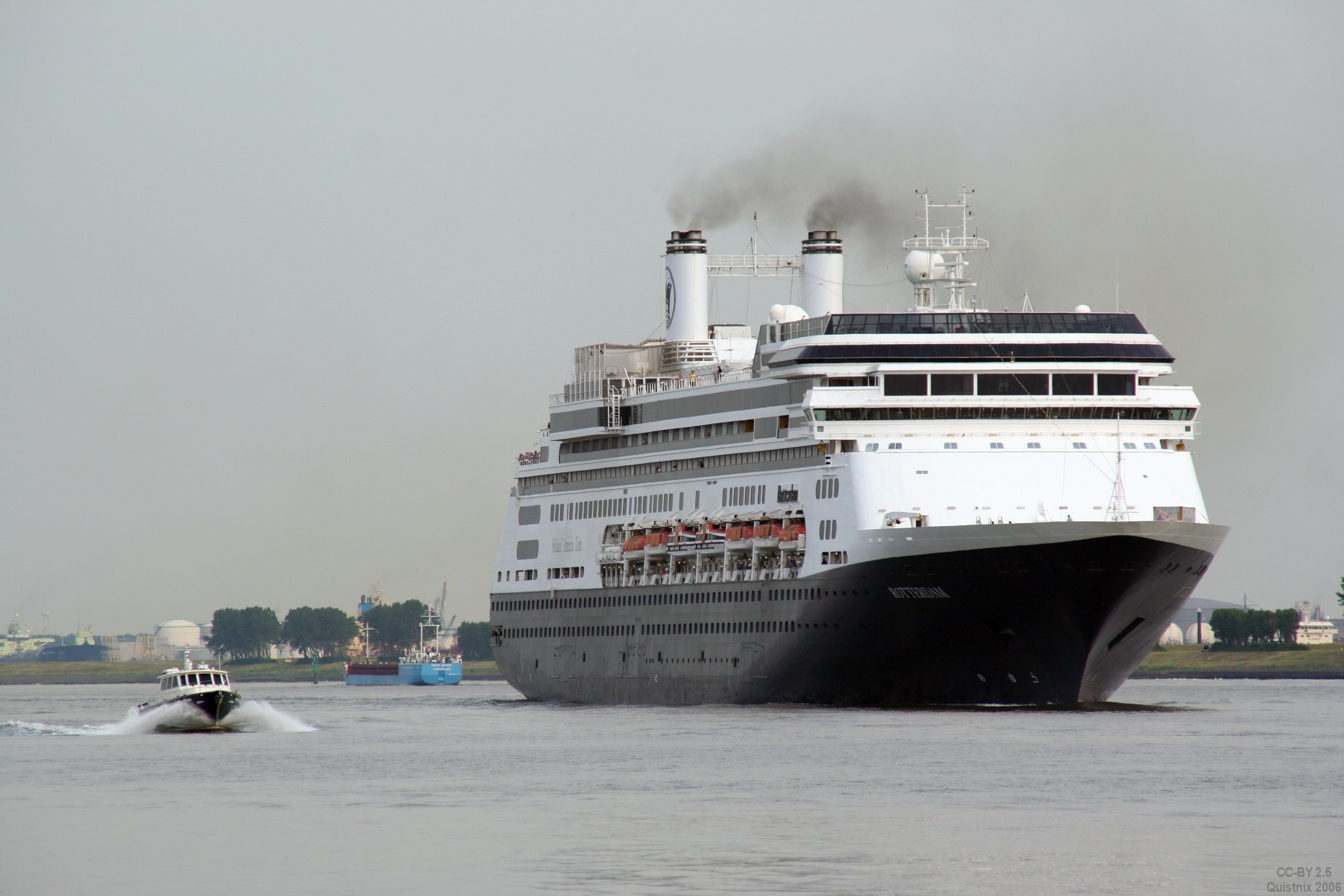
Rotterdam prior to 2012 refit

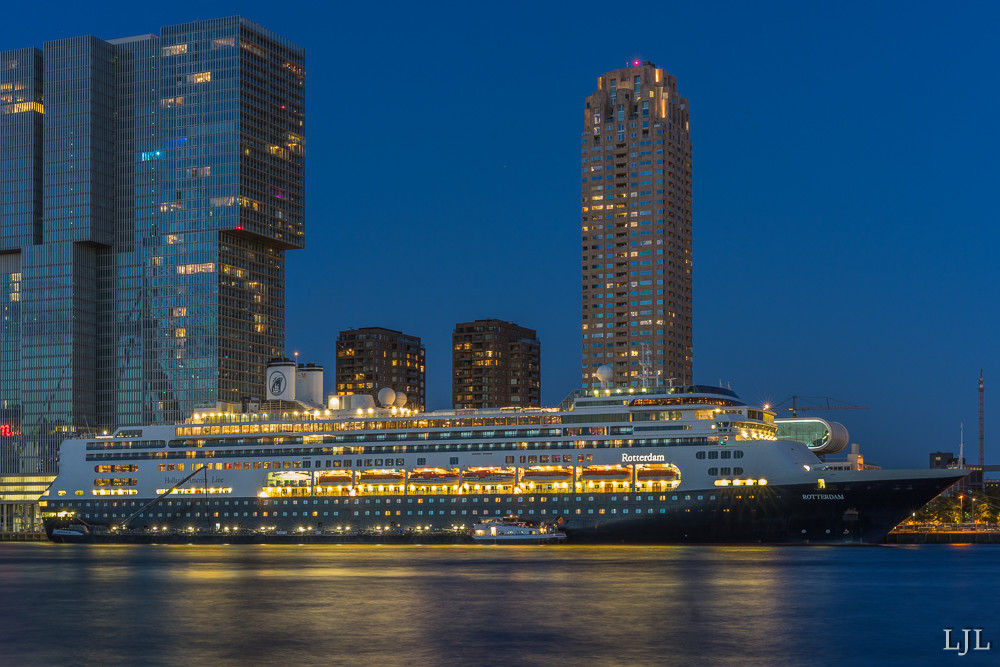
Rotterdam at Rotterdam in August 2018 after refit

Commissioned in 1997 by the Holland America Line, the vessel was christened as Rotterdam by Princess Margriet of the Netherlands on 9 December 1997, in Fort Lauderdale, Florida, and made its first call at the Port of Rotterdam on 10 June 1998. Rotterdam was the sixth Holland America vessel to bear the name. She was named for SS Rotterdam of 1959, and also named after the city of Rotterdam, Netherlands. The ship paid homage to the 1959 Rotterdam by having trademark twin funnels, along with lounges and dining rooms sharing the same name as the 1959 ship. MS Rotterdam and her sister ship MS Amsterdam were co-flagships of Holland America Line (HAL).

Rotterdam carried an art collection on board worth over US$2 million and featured fine art and antiques.

In September 2004, the vessel lost power when all four engines failed during Hurricane Karl while doing a transatlantic crossing. Swells reached 10 to 15 metres (33 to 49 ft). Many passengers suffered injuries during this period, the most severe being fractured bones. Rotterdam regained power and continued its journey to Halifax, Nova Scotia, arriving on 28 September.

During the summer of 2011, Rotterdam conducted Holland America Line's first standalone transatlantic crossing since 1971, making a single trip both eastbound and westbound.

==== Refit ====
In 2012, Rotterdam received a major refit in Hamburg. The upper aft superstructure was rebuilt with the addition of extra cabins, and the removal of the aft swimming pool.

==== Sold to Fred. Olsen Cruise Lines ====
Due to the pandemic and shutdown of the cruise industry, the flagships Rotterdam and sister Amsterdam were sold to Fred. Olsen Cruise Lines in summer 2020. The ship sailed from its namesake city one final time as the Rotterdam on 11 August 2020. A new MS Rotterdam (VII) debuted in July 2021.

=== As Borealis ===
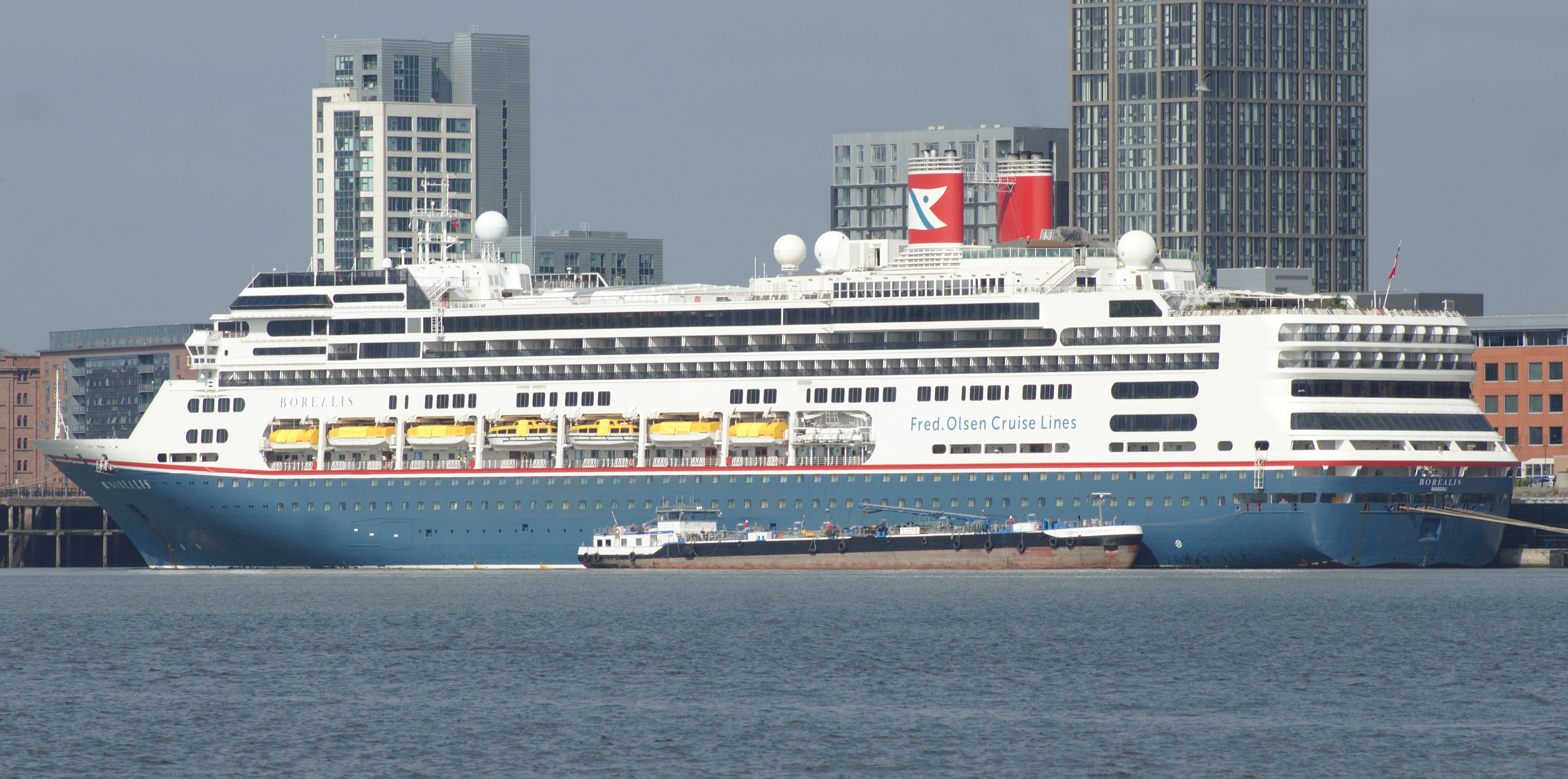
Borealis at Liverpool's cruise liner terminal

In the fall of 2020, the ship sailed to Scotland and was laid up with the rest of Fred. Olsen fleet prior to being refitted for service. The name Borealis refers to a ship of the same name that was part of the Fred. Olsen line in 1948, before it became a cruise line. The transformation of Rotterdam to Borealis started in August 2020 at Damen Shipyards in Schiedam, near Rotterdam with completion in July 2021. Shortly after making its maiden trip, Borealis suffered a technical issue that caused the cancellation of a cruise as the ship remained in Portsmouth.

Borealis appeared in the June 2025 episode of Channel 4's behind-the-scene documentary Dover 24/7: Britain’s Busiest Port, which followed the crew as it prepared the ship for the embarkation of new guests, and departing from the port.

In October 2025, Borealis underwent both interior and exterior upgrades during a two-week drydocking at Damen Shiprepair Rotterdam. Fred. Olsen Cruise Lines announced that Borealis would become an adult-only cruise ship as of 2026.

Borealis' homeport is Liverpool.
