= Missio =

Missio may refer to:

- Missio, public facing name of Pontifical Mission Societies, the Catholic Church's official charity for overseas mission

== People ==
- Egone Missio Fondo Egone Missio Archives
- Stefano Missio (1972) Italian filmmaker

== Music ==
- Missio (duo), US electronic duo formed in 2014
- Missió, late 1980s Hungarian heavy metal band, see Impulse (band)

== See also ==
- Missio Dei, Latin theological term for the "sending of God"
- Honesta missio, honorable discharge from the military service in the Roman Empire
- Redemptoris missio (Latin: The Mission of the Redeemer), subtitled On the permanent validity of the Church's missionary mandate, encyclical
