= Royal Cruise Line =

Defunct Greek cruise ship company

- Founded: 1974
- Founder: Pericles Panagopulos
- Defunct: 1996
- Headquarters: Piraeus, Greece
- Area served: Worldwide Cruises

Royal Cruise Line was a Greek cruise line that operated from 1974 to 1996 and founded by Pericles Panagopulos. The line catered mainly to American passengers looking for an upscale cruise experience and sailed mainly worldwide routes.

== History ==
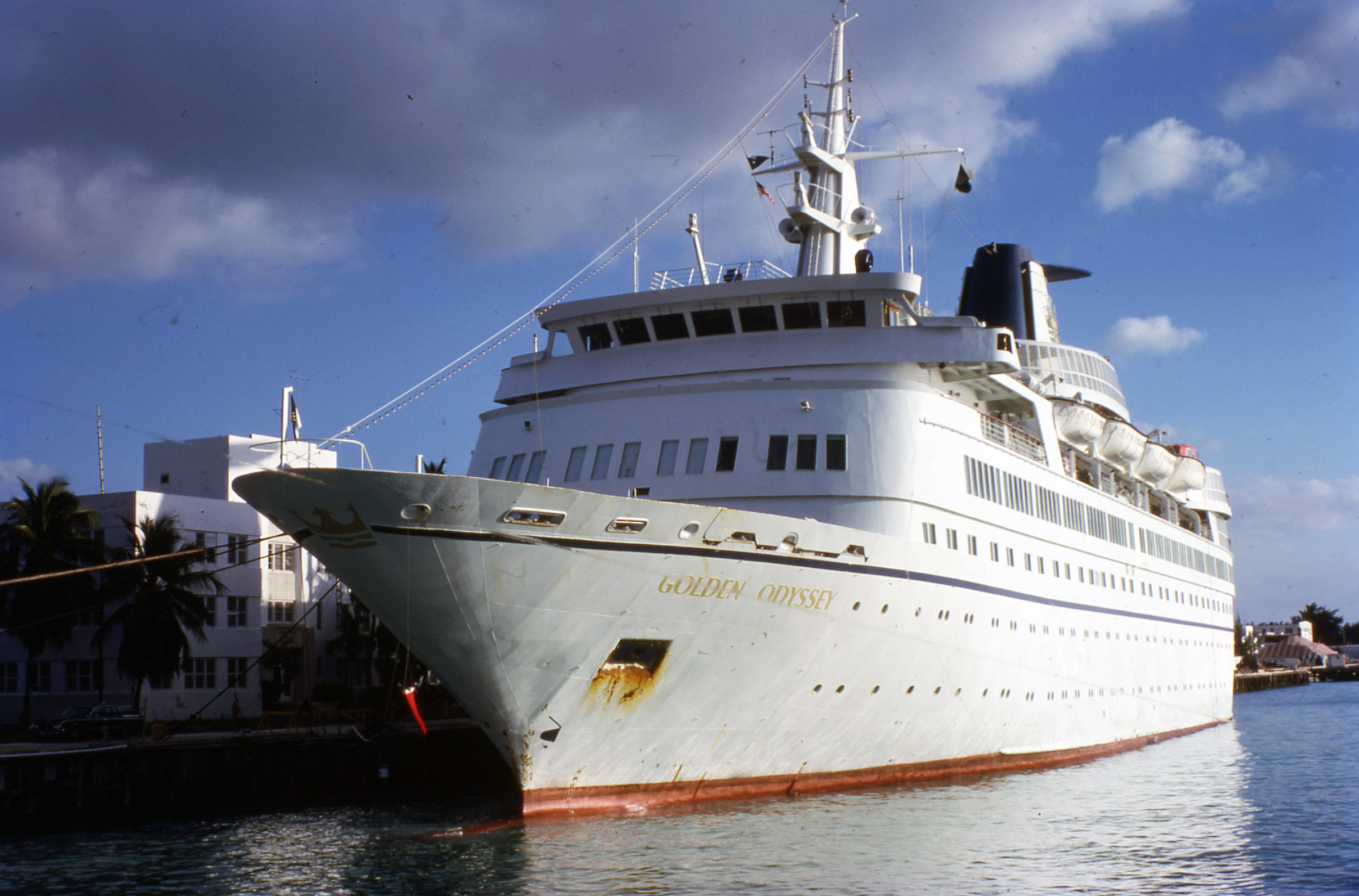
Golden odyssey, Royal Cruise Line's first ship

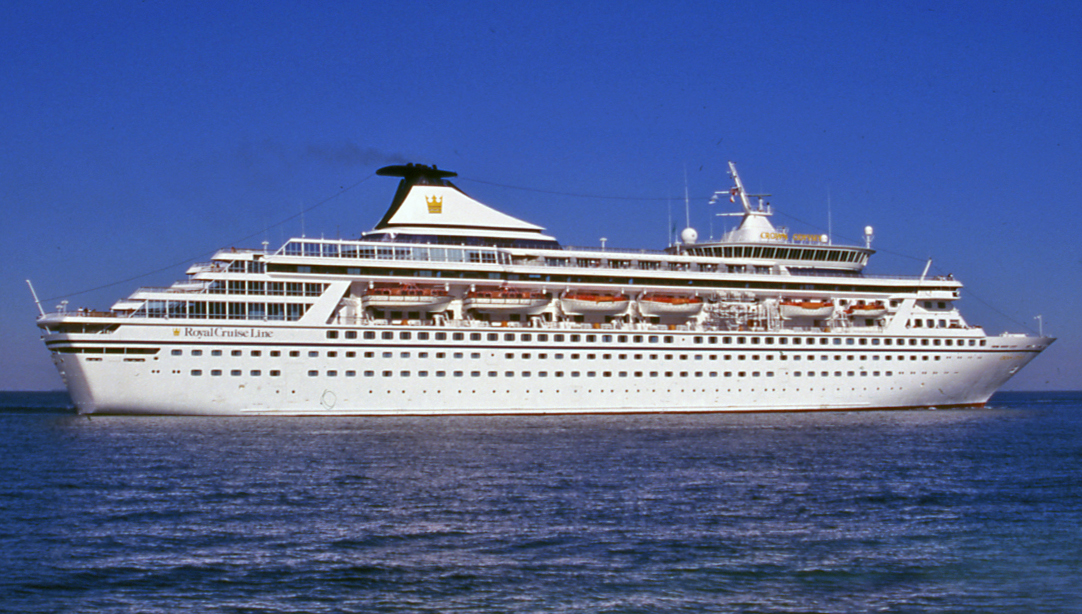
Crown Odyssey, the line's second new build

Royal Cruise Line was founded in 1974 with its first ship the Golden Odyssey, the first purpose built Greek ship, with an entirely Greek crew. With success of the Golden Odyssey, the line purchased their second ship from Home Lines, the SS Doric, in 1982. The ship was completely refurbished and debuted as the Royal Odyssey. The line ordered its second new build, the Crown Odyssey, in 1986, delivered in 1988. The new ship would replace the Royal Odyssey, which would be sold to Regency Cruises.

Royal Cruise Line became successful and known as a high standard cruise line. In 1989, owner Panagopulos unexpectedly decided to sell the profitable line. Royal Cruise Line was acquired by Kloster Cruises, the parent company of Norwegian Cruise Line for 225 million, with Kloster's intent of gaining a foothold in the upscale European cruise market.

In 1991, Norwegian transferred the Royal Viking Sea from their subsidiary Royal Viking Line to Royal Cruise Line, and renamed it Royal Odyssey. In 1994, Norwegian transferred her sister ship, which had been sailing as the Westward, to Royal Cruise Line after a 30 million dollar refit and renamed it Star Odyssey. The same year, the line would sell its first ship the Golden Odyssey.

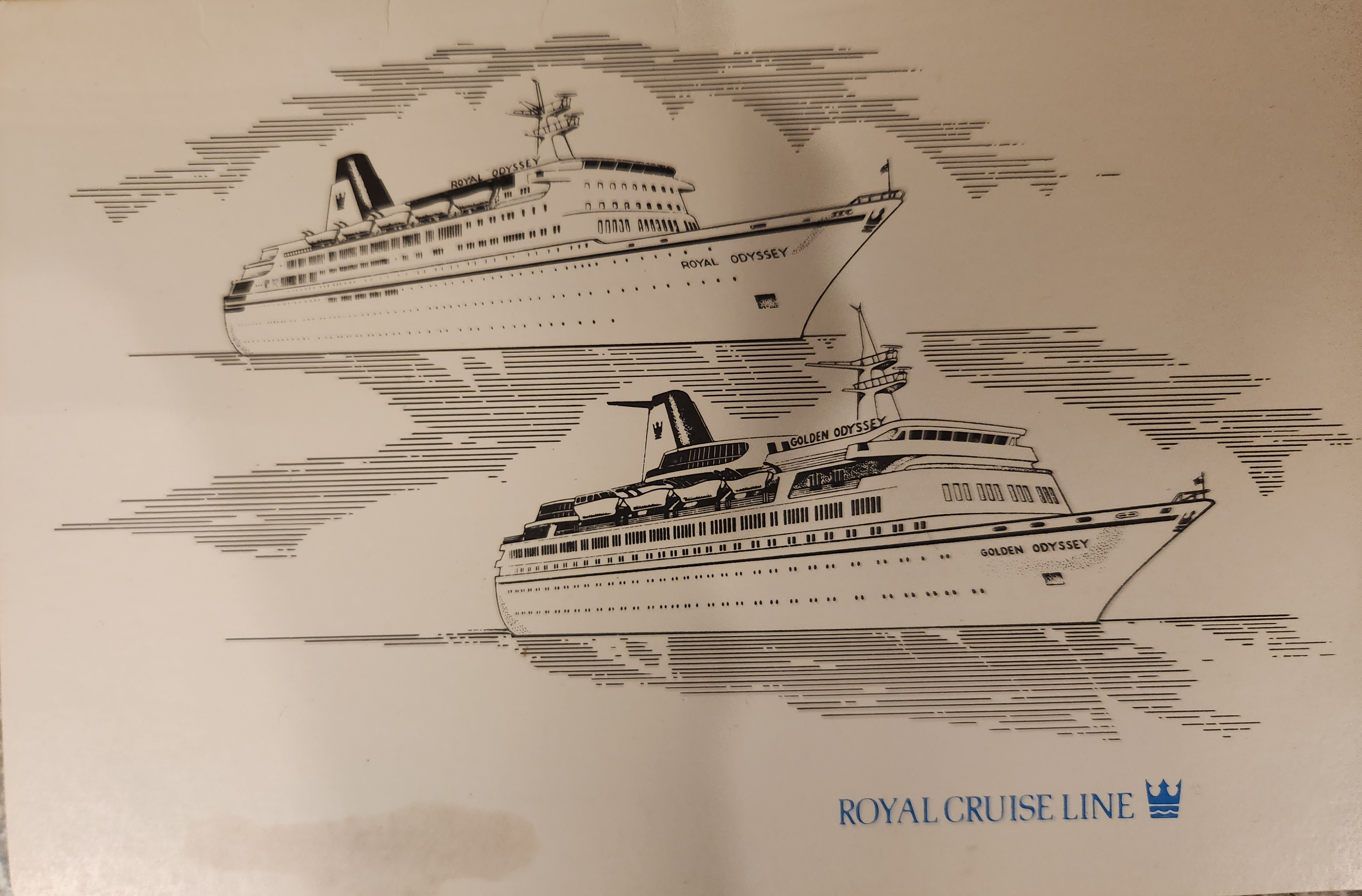
A postcard for Royal Cruise Line, featuring Golden Odyssey and Royal Odyssey.

In 1995, the Royal Cruise Line's fleet received a new addition with the Queen Odyssey, another ship that was transferred from the now former Royal Viking brand.

In 1996, parent company Kloster Cruises, was continuing to have financial difficulties, and was forced to reorganize. The Royal Cruise Line brand was dissolved that year after 22 years in business. The fleet was transferred or sold, with the Crown Odyssey and Royal Odyssey transferred to the Norwegian Cruise Line fleet to become the Norwegian Crown and Norwegian Star; the Queen Odyssey sold to Seabourn Cruise Line to become Seabourn Legend; and the final ship to leave the fleet, the Star Odyssey, which went to Fred Olsen Cruise Line to become the Black Watch.

== Fleet ==
	Built	Years in Fleet	Current Status	Notes
Golden Odyssey	1974	1974-1994	Gambling ship Rex Fortune out of Hong Kong	
Royal Odyssey	1964	1982-1988	Sank on the way to scrap yard in 2001	
Crown Odyssey	1988	1988-1996	Sailing for Fred Olsen Cruise Lines as the Balmoral	
Royal Odyssey	1973	1991-1996	Ended career as Phoenix Reisen's Albatros, Scrapped in 2021	
Star Odyssey	1972	1994-1996	Ended sailing career with Fred Olsen Cruise Lines as the Black Watch. Scrapped in 2022.	
Queen Odyssey	1992	1995-1996	Sailing for Windstar Cruises as Star Legend	
