= Home Lines =

Italian shipping company

- Industry: Ocean liner and cruise ship traffic
- Founded: 1946
- Defunct: 1988
- Fate: Acquisition
- Successor: Holland America Line
- Headquarters: Genoa, Italy
- Key people: Eugen Eugenides, Nicolaos Vernicos-Eugenides
- Subsidiaries: National Hellenic American Line

Home Lines was an Italian passenger shipping company that operated both ocean liners and cruise ships. The company was founded in 1946, and it ceased operations in 1988 when merged into Holland America Line. Although based in Genoa, Home Lines was an international company with ships registered in Panama, while the original company chairman Eugen Eugenides was Greek. By the time Home Lines was merged into Holland America, they were one of the most highly regarded cruise lines in the world.

Home Lines were connected to Cosulich Lines, Swedish American Line and Hamburg-America Line. Eugen Eugenides' adopted son Nicolaos Vernicos-Eugenides cofounded the Hamburg Atlantic Line in 1958, and he later was the CEO of both Home Lines and Hamburg Atlantic Line.

== History ==
=== 1946–64 ===
Home Lines was founded in 1946 in Genoa, with Swedish American Line and Cosulich Lines as major shareholders. The connection with Swedish American Line was reflected in the funnel colours of the new company - both SAL and Home Lines had yellow funnels with a blue disc containing crown(s); Home Lines' funnels differed from those of SAL only by featuring one arched crown instead of three circlet crowns. In the same year, the company purchased their first ship, the 10,699 gross ton Bergensfjord from Norwegian America Line, which was renamed SS Argentina and placed on transatlantic routes from Genoa to South America in 1947. Although operated by Home Lines, the ship was managed by Cosulich Lines. Already in 1946 Home Lines had purchased a second ship, the Swedish American liner Drottningholm (11,182 gross tons), but that ship was not delivered to the company until 1948, when she was renamed Brasil and placed alongside the Argentina on Genoa—South America service. In 1948 Home Lines purchased another former Swedish American ship, Kungsholm, that was renamed Italia, as well as the former Matson Lines ship Matsonia, which entered service in 1949 after a reconstruction as the first Atlantic. The Brasil and Italia were managed by South Atlantic Lines, which was owned by the same company as Swedish American Line.

In 1949 the Italia was transferred to Genoa—New York City service, marking the beginning of Home Lines' gradual change from the Genoa—South America service to North Atlantic service from Genoa and Germany to New York as well as Southampton to Canada. Brasil was rebuilt and renamed Homeland in 1951, coinciding with her move to Hamburg—Southampton—Halifax—New York service. While on this route she was managed by Hamburg-America Line. However, the Homeland was transferred to Genoa—Naples—Barcelona—New York service already in 1952, after being replaced by the Italia on the Germany—New York service. The Italia in turn came to be managed by Hamburg-America Line while on the service from Germany. The Argentina was sold to Zim Lines in 1953 and renamed Jerusalem, while the Atlantic was transferred to National Hellenic American Line in 1954 and renamed Queen Frederica. Home Lines had purchased the laid-up Mariposa from Matson Lines in 1953; she entered service in 1954 as the first Homeric. By 1955 at the latest Home Lines began making cruises from New York to The Bahamas during the winter season. The Homeland was sold for scrap in 1955, leaving Home Lines with just two ships, Italia and Homeric. In 1958 Home Lines abandoned transatlantic traffic to New York (leaving it to Hamburg Atlantic Line). In the same year the Italia was refitted and placed on Hamburg—Quebec service. In 1961 Home Lines gave up transatlantic traffic completely when the Italia was transferred to New York—Bahamas cruise service. Three years later the ship was sold to Freeport Bahama Enterprises for use as a floating hotel.

=== 1964–88 ===
In 1965 Home Lines took delivery of their first purpose-built ship, Oceanic, which replaced the ageing Italia. Although marketed as "the largest ship ever designed for year round cruises", the ship had in fact been originally designed as a two-class liner/cruise ship before Home Lines abandoned transatlantic crossings, and adapted to full-time cruising during construction. The Oceanic entered service on 1965 as Caribbean Luxury Cruise during 1965 till about March 1965 then to the New York—Bahamas cruise route, and the Homeric was transferred to cruising on the Caribbean. The Homeric suffered a major fire in the galleys and restaurants in 1973, and had to be withdrawn from service and scrapped. As a replacement Home Lines purchased the second Hanseatic from German Atlantic Line (Hamburg Atlantic Line after a name change), renaming her Doric. At the same time Home Lines had also considered purchasing the Bergensfjord from Norwegian America Line, but the deal was not realised. In 1976 the company made a bid to purchase the laid-up Italian Line ships Michelangelo and Raffaello, but the offer was turned down by the Italian Line.

In preparation for the delivery of the new Atlantic in 1982 by Capt. Alberto Marossa (1929-2005), the Doric was sold to Royal Cruise Line, becoming their Royal Odyssey. When delivered in April 1982, the Atlantic took over the New York—Bahama cruise service. Another new ship, the second Homeric, was ordered for delivery in 1986, and in preparation for that the Oceanic was sold to Premier Cruise Line in 1985, becoming their Starship Oceanic. Home Lines continued operating until 1988, when the company was purchased by Holland America Line and its operation merged into those of Holland America. The Atlantic was sold to Premier Cruise Line, becoming Starship Atlantic, while the Homeric became HAL's Westerdam.

== Ships ==
Ship	Built	In service for Home Lines	Tonnage	Status as of 2022	Image
Argentina	1913	1947–53	10,666 GRT	Scrapped 1959	
Brasil; Homeland	1905	1948–55	11,285 GRT	Scrapped 1955	
Italia	1928	1948–64	21,250 GRT	Scrapped 1965	
Atlantic	1927	1949–54	20,553 GRT	Scrapped 1978	
Homeric	1931	1954–73	18,563 GRT	Scrapped 1974	
Oceanic	1965	1965–85	37,645 GRT	Scrapped 2012	
Doric	1964	1973–81	25,338 GRT	Sunk 2001	
Atlantic	1982	1982–88	35,143 GRT	Scrapped 2018	
Homeric	1986	1986–88	42,092 GRT	Scrapped 2022	

The design and construction records of Oceanic have been preserved and are now in the Fondo Egone Missio Archives (Egone Missio Archives) in Monfalcone, Italy.
