= Fondo Egone Missio Archives =

The Fondo Egone Missio (Egone Missio Archives) contains thousands of documents and photographs from 1909 to 1967 relevant to the design and construction of passenger ships, from the original drawings of Monfalcone yard no. 1 (the steamship Trieste of 1909) to all the reference papers of the design and construction of Home Lines SS Oceanic (1965).

The archive is headquartered in Via Rosselli 20, 34074 Monfalcone, Italy. It was created in 2004 by Mrs. Edda Missio, daughter to the ship designer Mr. Egone Missio of Monfalcone, who entered the local shipyard a few months after its foundation, on 11 January 1909 as apprentice carpenter. He became the chief of the passenger design office in 1943, and he worked there until 1967. Missio kept a day-by-day business diary from 1952 to 1967, in which details of his career and of the ships he designed can be found, including details of all the meetings between the parties involved in the conception and design of the SS Oceanic. He designed several well-known passenger vessels, including MS Giulio Cesare (1951) and Oceanic (1965).

A book devoted to the career of naval architect of Egone Missio, and the ocean liners he designed at the Monfalcone Shipyard was published in 2009.
