= MV Balmoral (2008) =

2008 cruise ship

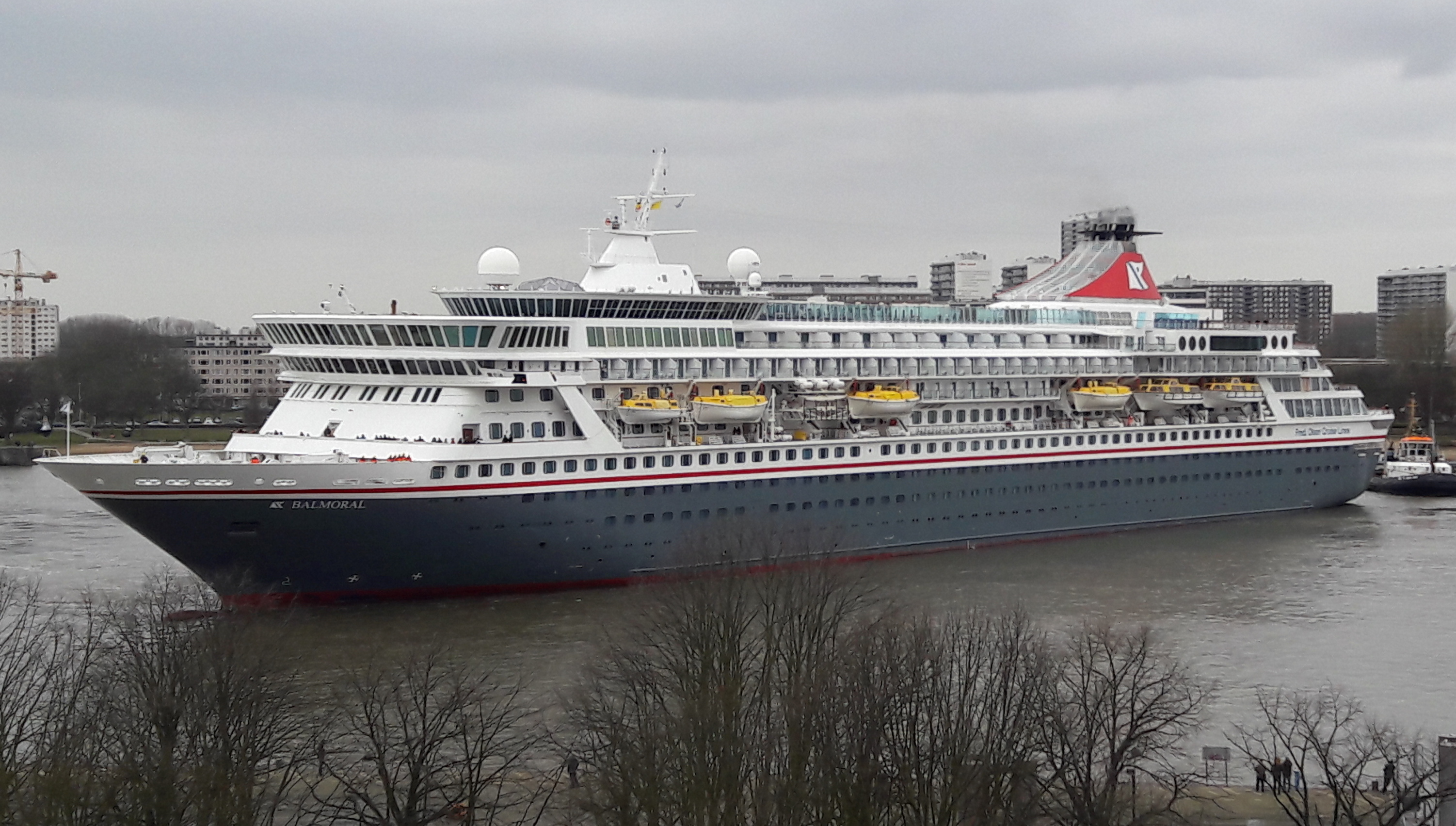
- Balmoral in Antwerp, Belgium on 19 March 2016.

History

Bahamas
- Name: 1988–1996: Crown Odyssey; 1996–2000: Norwegian Crown; 2000–2003: Crown Odyssey; 2003–2007: Norwegian Crown; 2008 onwards: Balmoral
- Owner: 1988–1992: Royal Cruise Line; 1992–2004: Norwegian Cruise Line; 2004–2006: Crown Odyssey Ltd; 2007 onwards: Balmoral Cruise Ltd
- Operator: 1988–1996: Royal Cruise Line; 1996–2000: Norwegian Cruise Line; 2000–2003: Orient Lines; 2003–2007: Norwegian Cruise Line; 2007 onwards: Fred. Olsen Cruise Lines
- Port of registry: 1988–1990: Pireus, Greece; 1990 onwards: Nassau, Bahamas
- Builder: Meyer Werft, Papenburg, West Germany
- Cost: $178 million
- Yard number: 616
- Launched: 1 November 1987
- Christened: 14 May 1988
- Acquired: June 1988
- In service: 1988–present
- Identification: IMO number: 8506294
- Status: in active service

General characteristics (as rebuilt, 2007)
- Tonnage: 43,537 GT
- Length: 217.91 m (714 ft 11 in)
- Draught: 7.25 m (23 ft 9 in)
- Decks: 10 (passenger accessible)
- Speed: 15.5 knots (28.7 km/h; 17.8 mph)
- Capacity: 1,325 passengers
- Crew: 530
- Notes: Otherwise the same as built

General characteristics (as built, 1988)
- Type: Cruise ship
- Tonnage: 34,242 GT; 5,186 DWT
- Length: 187.71 m (615 ft 10 in)
- Beam: 28.21 m (92 ft 7 in)
- Draught: 6.80 m (22 ft 4 in)
- Installed power: 2 × MaK 8M601/ 4 × 6M35; 28,200 kW (combined)
- Propulsion: Two propellers
- Speed: 22.5 knots (41.7 km/h; 25.9 mph)
- Capacity: 1,230 passengers (maximum)

Balmoral is a cruise ship owned and operated by Fred. Olsen Cruise Lines. She was built in 1988 by the Meyer Werft shipyard in Papenburg, West Germany, as Crown Odyssey for Royal Cruise Line. She has also sailed for the Norwegian Cruise Line as Norwegian Crown and Orient Lines as Crown Odyssey. In 2007–2008 she was lengthened by 30 m (98 ft) at the Blohm + Voss shipyard in Hamburg prior to entering service with her current operator.

== History ==
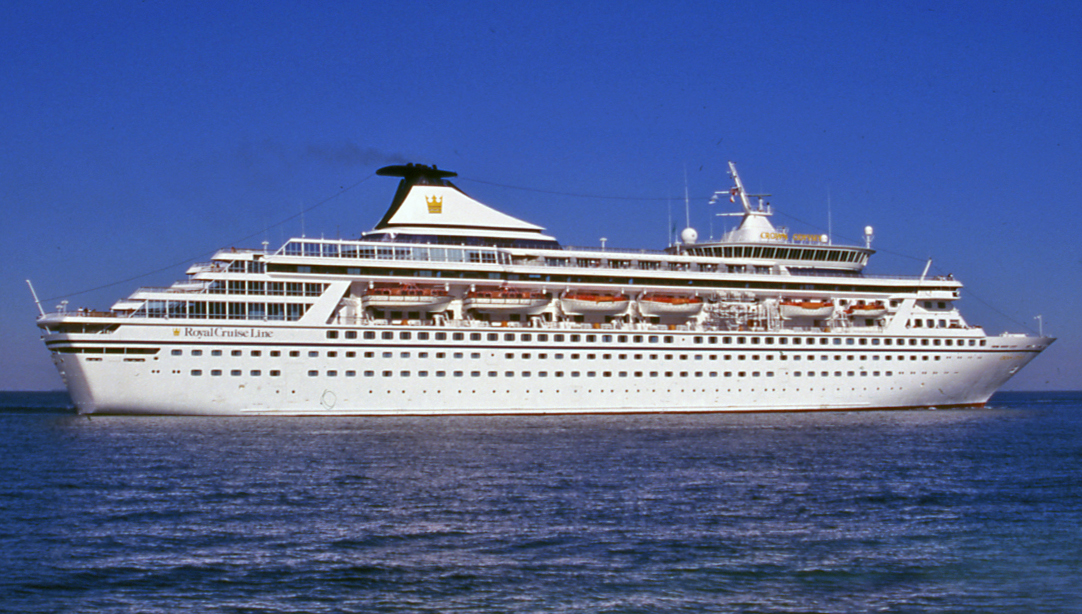
Crown Odyssey in Key West, February 1995.

The vessel was built by Meyer Werft of Papenburg, Germany, in 1988, for service with Royal Cruise Line as the Crown Odyssey. In 1989, Royal Cruise Line was sold to Norwegian Cruise Line, which continued operation of the company, along with the Crown Odyssey, until 1996. A reorganization of all the fleets owned by Norwegian Cruise Line saw Crown Odyssey enter service with NCL's main fleet, where it was renamed Norwegian Crown.

Following the purchase of Orient Lines by NCL in April 2000, Norwegian Crown was transferred, regaining her original name, Crown Odyssey, in the process.

In September 2003, Crown Odyssey was refurbished and returned to the NCL fleet, again with the name Norwegian Crown.

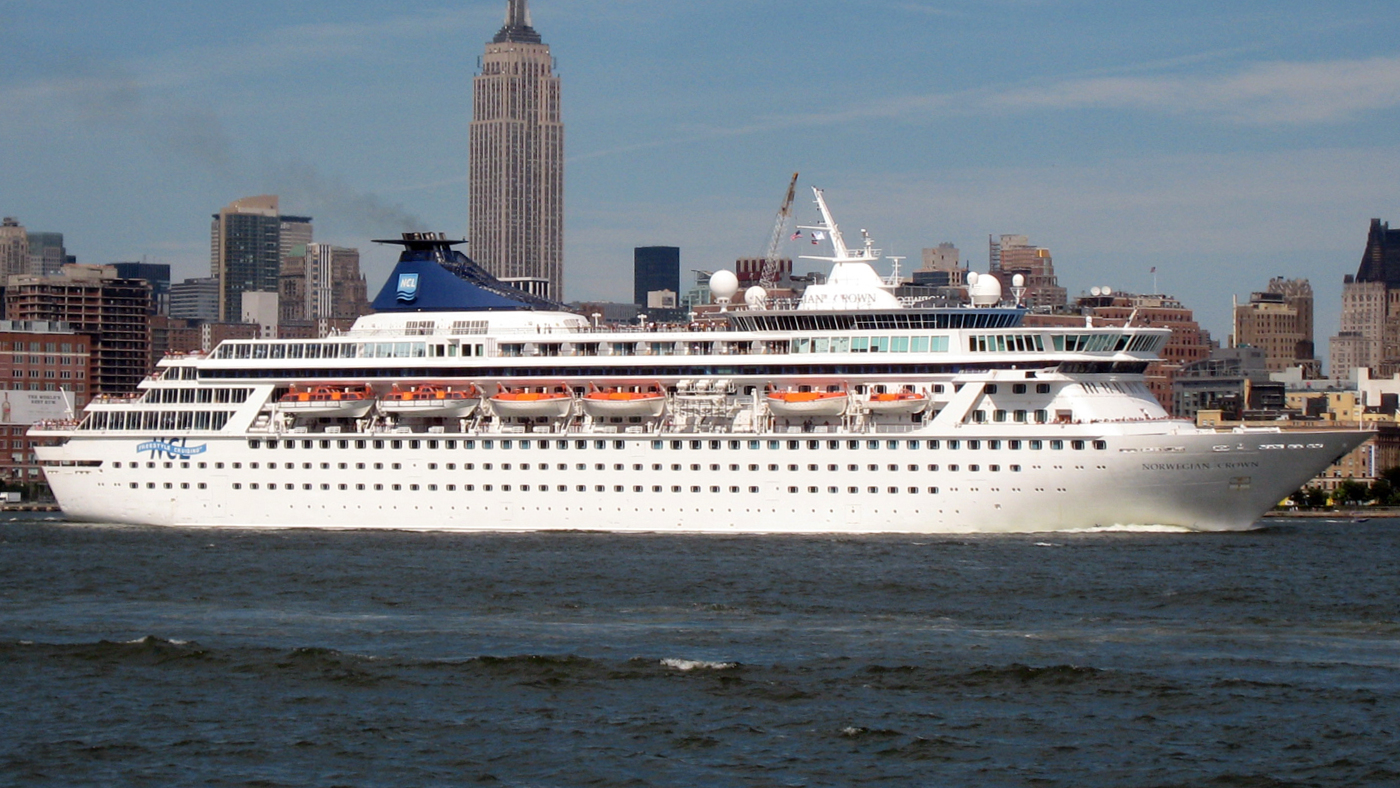
Norwegian Crown at New York City, New York on 22 July 2007.

On 25 May 2006, NCL Corporation announced that its parent company, Star Cruises, had agreed to sell Norwegian Crown to Fred. Olsen Cruise Lines effective August 2006. Star Cruises concurrently chartered the vessel back from Fred. Olsen and NCL continued her deployment through to November 2007. "Although a beautiful and well-maintained vessel, Norwegian Crown's smaller size is less suitable for Star Cruises' ambitions in Asia," said Colin Veitch, president and CEO of NCL Corporation. "Fred. Olsen Cruise Lines specializes in operating smaller and mid-sized upscale vessels and this ship should fit perfectly in their fleet." Her last NCL cruise was on 28 October 2007.

On 21 January 2009, during a cruise, the ship sailed into rough weather in the Bay of Biscay, smashing through 50 ft (15 m) waves and 60 mph (97 km/h) winds. Two passengers were sent to a hospital in A Coruña, Spain, with serious injuries.

== Reconstruction ==
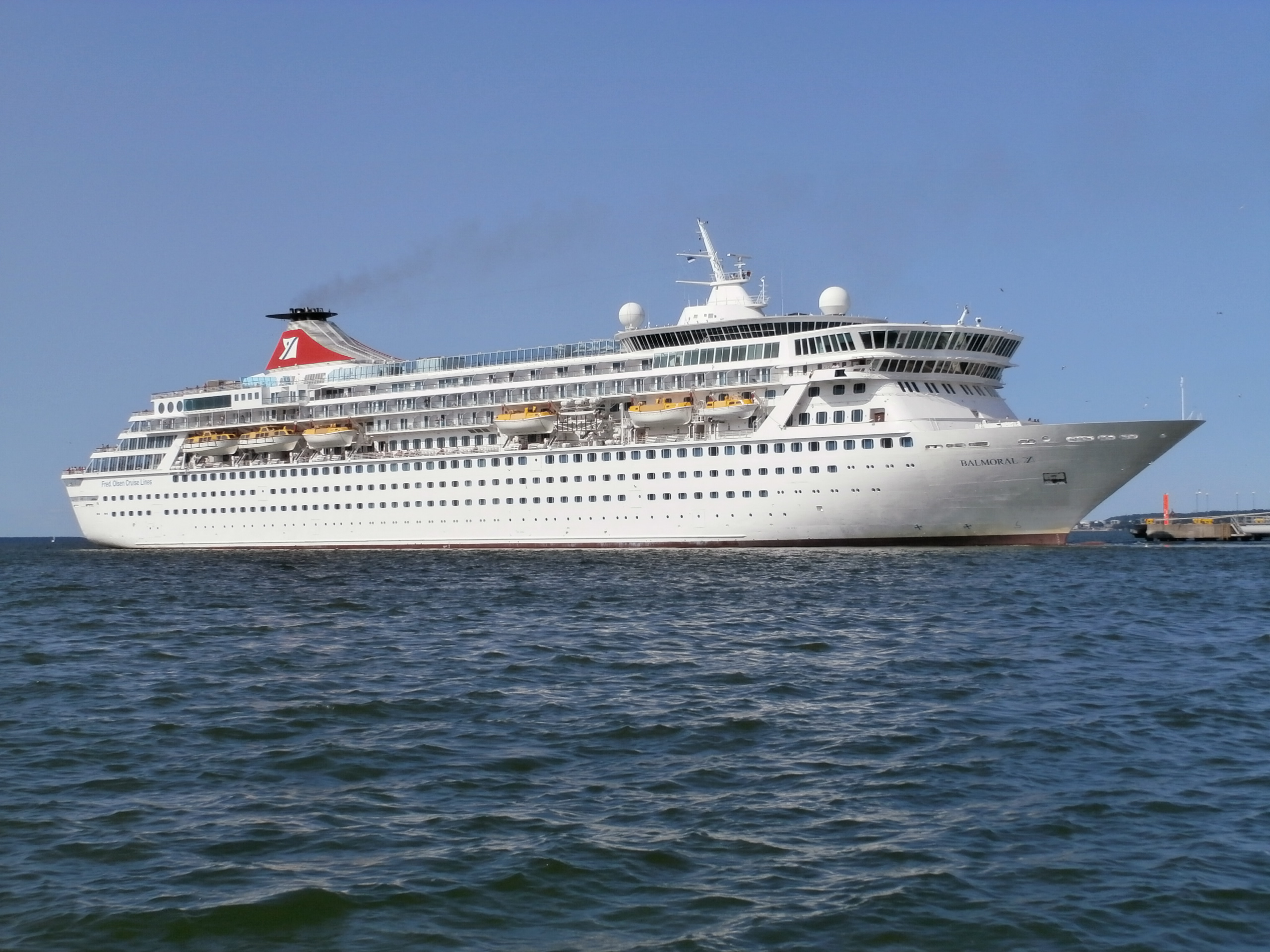
Balmoral in Tallinn, Estonia on 9 July 2013.

Fred. Olsen took delivery of the ship on 7 November 2007, renaming her after the Balmoral estate in 2008. The company initiated a major refit at the Blohm + Voss repair shipyard in Hamburg, Germany, before her inaugural cruise on 13 February 2008, to Florida—her base for Caribbean cruising. The work lengthening the ship with an insertion of a 30-metre (98 ft) midsection, built in conjunction with Schichau Seebeckwerft in Bremerhaven, and floated into Hamburg at the end of October 2007.

The reconstruction added a further 186 passenger and 53 crew cabins as well as creating new and modified public areas.

== Titanic commemoration ==
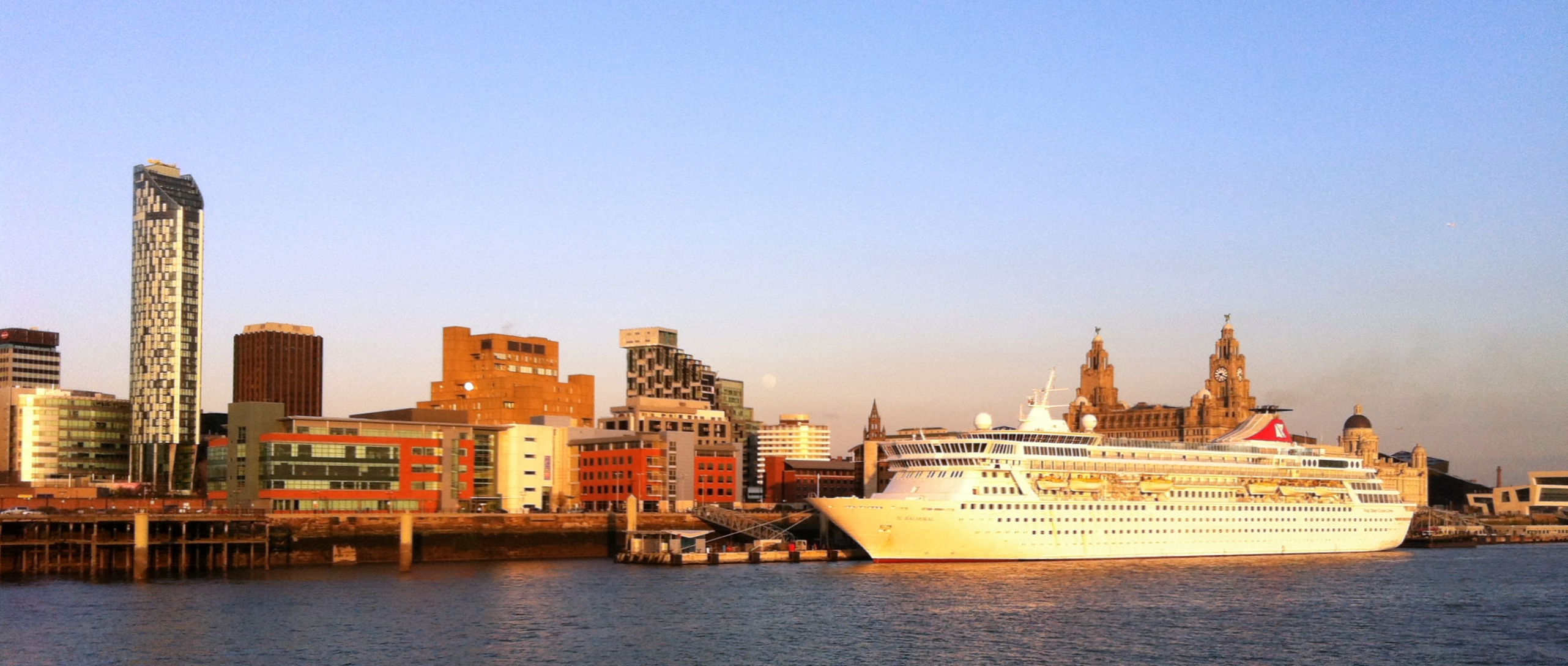
Balmoral at the Port of Liverpool prior to the Titanic commemoration, April 2012.

Balmoral was chartered by Miles Morgan Travel to follow the original route of RMS Titanic, intending to stop over the point on the sea bed where Titanic rests on 15 April 2012, to honor the 100th anniversary of her sinking. She set sail from Southampton on 8 April 2012, passing Cherbourg and then on to Cobh, formerly Queenstown, in the Republic of Ireland, arriving on 9 April 2012. Cobh was the last port of call for RMS Titanic before she set off across the Atlantic.

Balmoral reached the site of the wreck of Titanic in time for the 100th anniversary of the sinking at 11pm on 14 April 2012. A memorial service was held onboard which culminated in three floral wreaths being cast overboard. Balmoral remained at the location overnight and then departed early the following morning, with the intention of reaching Titanic's intended destination of New York City.

== Public spaces ==
Balmoral has eleven decks, nine of which are designated passenger decks, numbered 3 to 11.
