= Mighty Ships =

- Mighty Ships logo
- Genre: Documentary
- Created by: Exploration Production Inc. Discovery Channel
- Narrated by: Barbara Budd; Anthony Green
- Music by: Greg Johnston
- Country of origin: Canada
- Original language: English
- No. of seasons: 10
- No. of episodes: 62 (list of episodes)

Production
- Running time: 45 minutes

Original release
- Network: Discovery Channel Canada
- Release: 27 July 2008 – 5 June 2016

Mighty Ships is a documentary television program produced by Exploration Production Inc. in Canada and aired on Discovery Channel Canada and also broadcast around the world. Each episode of the series follows a particular sea-going vessel and provides an insight into the ship and its crew.

The first episode of the tenth season, featuring the Faroes' largest ferry ship, MS Norröna, was first broadcast in Canada on 3 December 2017. The second episode, first aired on 10 December 2017, featured MSC Oscar, the largest container ship in the world.

Mighty Cruise Ships is a spin-off series focusing on cruise ships which began to air in late 2014.

== Series overview ==
A typical episode follows the crew of a particular vessel as it prepares to embark upon a voyage and concludes at the end of the journey or once a particular job has been completed. The operational capabilities and technical aspects of the ship feature heavily in the series, whilst members of the ship's crew provide an insight into life at sea and provide a human perspective. The series also makes use of computer-generated animation to show scenes which would otherwise be unobtainable, such as underwater operations.

The series was started after the success of a one-off special on the Discovery Channel entitled Inside Queen Mary 2. The series has featured an extensive range of different types of marine vessels, with cruise ships, an aircraft carrier, fishing boats, dredgers and various types of cargo ships, naval and specialist ships being shown.

In a first for the series, season 7 includes a double-length episode about the maiden voyage of cruise ship Norwegian Breakaway and its construction and sea trials. Season 7 also includes a compilation episode showing vessels from the first six seasons.

The show's mixture of technical insight and human stories has proved popular with audiences.

Mighty Planes is a spin-off series in the same format but featuring aircraft rather than ships. Other later series in the franchise have included Mighty Trains and The Mightiest.

== Episodes ==
=== One-off special ===
No. overall	No. in season	Title	Vessel type	Vessel operator	Narrator	Original release date
1	1	"Inside Queen Mary 2"	Ocean Liner	Cunard Line	Barbara Budd	2008
The world's largest ocean liner prepares to set sail on a five-night voyage across the Atlantic Ocean from New York City to Southampton, United Kingdom. Whilst providing entertainment and 16,000 meals a day to passengers, the crew must deal with bad weather and an infectious virus requiring passengers to be quarantined.

=== Season 1 ===
No. overall	No. in season	Title	Vessel type	Vessel operator	Narrator	Original release date
2	1	"Emma Maersk"	Container Ship	Maersk Line	Barbara Budd	22 July 2008
Container ship Emma Maersk battles the threat of piracy and monsoons as she transports her cargo from Tanjung Pelepas, Malaysia, through the Indian Ocean, Red Sea, Suez Canal and Mediterranean Sea to Algeciras, Spain.
3	2	"Becrux"	Livestock carrier	Siba Ships	Barbara Budd	29 July 2008
Livestock carrier MV Becrux carries 16,000 cattle from Darwin, Australia to Jakarta, Indonesia. The crew ensure they are not at risk from piracy whilst also maintaining the welfare and condition of their animals.
4	3	"Faust"	Car Carrier	Wallenius Wilhelmsen Logistics	Barbara Budd	5 August 2008
One of the largest car carriers in the world makes a winter Atlantic crossing between Southampton, UK and Newark, New Jersey, United States.
5	4	"Henry Larsen"	Icebreaker	Canadian Coast Guard	Barbara Budd	12 August 2008
Off the coast of Newfoundland, Canadian Coastguard icebreaker CCGS Henry Larsen patrols the frozen seas, assists the ferry Beaumont Hamel to navigate through the ice fields on its journey from Fogo Island and rescues cargo vessels which become trapped by ice.
6	5	"Paul R. Tregurtha"	Lake Freighter	Interlake Steamship Co.	Barbara Budd	19 August 2008
The bulk carrier Paul R. Tregurtha, largest freighter on the Great Lakes, has a difficult first journey of the season from Sturgeon Bay, Wisconsin to Superior, Wisconsin, through ice-choked waters, to pick up coal destined for Detroit, Michigan.
7	6	"Tyco Resolute"	Cable Layer	Tyco Telecommunications	Barbara Budd	26 August 2008
Off the Pacific coast of Costa Rica, Tyco Resolute lays fibre optic cable to connect the country into PAC-1, a major subsea telecommunications cable running between Panama and California.

=== Season 2 ===
No. overall	No. in season	Title	Vessel type	Vessel operator	Narrator	Original release date
8	1	"MV Resolution"	Turbine Installation Vessel	MPI Offshore Ltd	Barbara Budd	28 August 2009
The first ever purpose built vessel for constructing wind turbines, MV Resolution, docks at Belfast, Northern Ireland to collect turbine components before setting sail for the Robin Rigg Wind Farm in the Solway Firth to assist with its construction.
9	2	"Peace in Africa"	Dredger	De Beers	Barbara Budd	2009
In the Southern Atlantic Ocean off the west coast of South Africa, the world's largest offshore mining vessel, MV Peace in Africa, searches for diamonds using its sub-sea crawler.
10	3	"Akamalik"	Factory Trawler	Royal Greenland	Barbara Budd	2009
Factory trawler of Royal Greenland fleet, Akamalik, sets sails from Sisimiut to the shrimping grounds of the North Atlantic Ocean as the lives of the crew are put at risk in the freezing winter weather.
11	4	"USS Nimitz"	Supercarrier	US Navy	Barbara Budd	10 August 2009
Nuclear powered supercarrier USS Nimitz (CVN-68) and her 75 aircraft and 5000 crew, train from three months off the coast of Southern California, as she prepares for deployment to the Arabian Sea as part of the war in Afghanistan.
12	5	"HDMS Absalon"	Flexible Support Ship	Royal Danish Navy	Barbara Budd	2009
Danish warship HDMS Absalon [L16] leads Combined Task Force 150 in its fight against Somali pirates in the Gulf of Aden.
13	6	"MV Fairplayer"	Heavy-Lift Ship	Jumbo Shipping	Barbara Budd	2009
On her maiden voyage, the MV Fairplayer transports 4000 tonnes of oil refinery components from Ortona, Italy to a refinery in Port Arthur, Texas.

=== Season 3 ===
No. overall	No. in season	Title	Vessel type	Vessel operator	Narrator	Original release date
14	1	"G.O. Sars"	Research Vessel	Norwegian Institute of Marine Research	Barbara Budd	2010
G.O. Sars sets sail from Tromsø, Norway on a research voyage to the Arctic Ocean to examine a subsea volcano and hydrothermal vent field, with the aim of discovering new lifeforms.
15	2	"Africa Mercy"	Hospital Ship	Mercy Ships	Anthony Green	2010
Floating hospital Africa Mercy sails from Tenerife bound for Lomé, Togo on the west coast of Africa. On arrival the medical staff provide treatments to Togolese patients both on-board the ship and within clinics set-up onshore, whilst mechanics ensure the ship remains serviceable.
16	3	"Cristóbal Colón"	Dredger	Jan De Nul Group	Barbara Budd	2010
The world's first super dredger provides 2.5 million cubic metres of sand for the construction of a new port at Cuxhaven on the mouth of the Elbe River in Germany.
17	4	"USS Kentucky"	Ballistic Missile Submarine	US Navy	Barbara Budd	2010
USS Kentucky (SSBN-737) departs Bangor, Washington state on a highly classified 70-day mission in the Pacific Ocean. One of the largest submarines ever built, she forms part of the United States' strategic nuclear deterrent.
18	5	"Oasis of the Seas"	Cruise Ship	Royal Caribbean International	Anthony Green	2010
The largest cruise ship ever built prepares to set sail on her maiden voyage from Fort Lauderdale, Florida. Her 5400 passengers are taken on a seven-day Caribbean cruise which includes stops in the US Virgin Islands, St. Maarten and the Bahamas.
19	6	"MV Solitaire"	Pipe-Laying Ship	Allseas Group	Barbara Budd	2010
In the Ormen Lange Gas Field, located 120 miles off the west coast of Norway, MV Solitaire lays pipeline to connect a new gas well into the existing subsea pipe network.

=== Season 4 ===
No. overall	No. in season	Title	Vessel type	Vessel operator	Narrator	Original release date
20	1	"MV Beluga Bremen"	Cargo Ship	Beluga Shipping	Barbara Budd	2011
On her maiden voyage, super heavy lifter Beluga Bremen transports Beluga Shipping's largest ever load – mining equipment bound for a gold mine in the Dominican Republic. After careful loading in Kuantan, Malaysia and picking up a further load in Shanghai, she sets sail across the Pacific Ocean.
21	2	"USNS Robert E. Peary"	Cargo Ship	US Navy	Barbara Budd	2011
22	3	"DSV Skandi Arctic"	Diving Support Vessel	DOF Subsea	Barbara Budd	2011
23	4	"MV Stena Britannica"	ROPAX Ferry	Stena Line	Barbara Budd	2011
24	5	"USCGC Bertholf"	National Security Cutter	US Coast Guard	Barbara Budd	2011
25	6	"CCGS Amundsen"	Icebreaker and Arctic Research Vessel	Canadian Coast Guard	Barbara Budd	2011

=== Season 5 ===
No. overall	No. in season	Title	Vessel type	Vessel operator	Narrator	Original release date
26	1	"Norwegian Epic"	Cruise Ship	Norwegian Cruise Line	Barbara Budd	20 July 2011
27	2	"North Star"	Roll-on/Roll-off Cargo Ship	TOTE Maritime Alaska	Barbara Budd	2011
28	3	"Le Boréal"	Cruise Ship	Compagnie du Ponant	Barbara Budd	2011
29	4	"FPSO Maersk Peregrino"	Floating Production Storage and Offloading Vessel	Maersk FPSO	Anthony Green	2011
30	5	"Umiak I"	Icebreaking Bulk Carrier	Fednav Group	Barbara Budd	2011
31	6	"USS Gravely"	Guided Missile Destroyer	US Navy	Barbara Budd	2011

=== Season 6 ===
No. overall	No. in season	Title	Vessel type	Vessel operator	Narrator	Original release date
32	1	"MV Stornes"	Fallpipe vessel	Van Oord	Barbara Budd	2012
33	2	"USNS Grasp"	Salvage ship	US Navy	Barbara Budd	2012
34	3	"Crystal Serenity"	Cruise ship	Crystal Cruises	Barbara Budd	2012
35	4	"USS New York"	Amphibious Transport Dock	US Navy	Barbara Budd	2012
36	5	"Northern Eagle"	Fishing Trawler	American Seafoods	Barbara Budd	2012
37	6	"Neptune"	Jackup Vessel	GeoSea NV	Barbara Budd	2012

=== Season 7 ===
No. overall	No. in season	Title	Vessel type	Vessel operator	Narrator	Original release date
38	1	"Norwegian Breakaway: The Build"	Cruise Ship	Norwegian Cruise Line	Barbara Budd	10 November 2013
39	2	"Norwegian Breakaway: The Voyage"	Cruise Ship	Norwegian Cruise Line	Barbara Budd	10 November 2013
40	3	"Wind Surf"	Motor Sailing Yacht and Cruise Ship	Windstar Cruises	Barbara Budd	15 November 2013
During an eight-day Mediterranean cruise Wind Surf's three hundred passengers depart from Venice and call at the Croatian ports of Rovinj, Split and Dubrovnik, Kotor in Montenegro and Messina in Sicily, before arriving at her final destination of Rome.
41	4	"MV Avataq"	Cargo Ship	NEAS	Barbara Budd	22 November 2013
Avataq is on a 3500km journey to provide essential supplies to the community of Kuujjuaq in Canada's near-Arctic.
42	5	"Ibn Battuta"	Cutter Suction Dredger	Jan De Nul Group	Barbara Budd	29 November 2013
43	6	"Stemat Spirit"	Cable Laying Vessel	Stemat Marine Services	Barbara Budd	6 December 2013
44	7	"Best of Mighty Ships"	Various	Various	Barbara Budd	13 December 2013

=== Season 8 ===
No. overall	No. in season	Title	Vessel type	Vessel operator	Narrator	Original release date
45	1	"Quantum of the Seas"	Cruise Ship	Royal Caribbean International	Barbara Budd	19 July 2015
46	2	"Hawk"	Semi-submersible heavy-lift ship	Offshore Heavy Transport	Barbara Budd	19 July 2015
47	3	"Happy Star"	Heavy-Lift Ship	Big Lift Shipping	Barbara Budd	26 July 2015
48	4	"Algoma Equinox"	Lake Freighter	Algoma Central Marine	Barbara Budd	2 August 2015
49	5	"HDMS Peter Willemoes"	Frigate	Royal Danish Navy	Barbara Budd	9 August 2015
50	6	"Maersk Interceptor"	Jackup Rig	Maersk Drilling	Barbara Budd	16 August 2015

=== Season 9 ===
No. overall	No. in season	Title	Vessel type	Vessel operator	Narrator	Original release date
51	1	"North Sea Giant"	Subsea Construction Vessel	North Sea Shipping	Barbara Budd	
One of the world’s largest subsea construction vessels sets out to build a massive natural gas compression station – 300 metres underwater.
52	2	"Tonsberg"	Roll-on/roll-off Transport Vessel	Wilh. Wilhelmsen	Barbara Budd	8 May 2016
The world’s largest roll-on/roll-off vessel races against the clock to load and transport luxury cars, SUVs and construction equipment across the Atlantic Ocean.
53	3	"USNS Comfort"	Hospital Ship	United States Navy	Barbara Budd	15 May 2016
US Navy hospital ship travels from Colombia and through the Panama Canal on a mission of mercy to the tiny Caribbean island of Dominica.
54	4	"Northern Leader "	Longline Fishing Vessel	Alaskan Leader	Barbara Budd	22 May 2016
Alaska’s biggest longline fishing ship battles high waves and hurricane-force winds to bring home a massive catch of cod.
55	5	"Maersk Viking"	Drill Ship	Maersk	Barbara Budd	29 May 2016
One of the world’s most advanced drill ships builds an oil well more than 2000 metres below the waterline in the Gulf of Mexico.
56	6	"Fram"	Expedition Cruise Ship	Hurtigruten	Barbara Budd	5 June 2016
The world’s most adventurous cruise ship fights through the ice-choked fjords of Greenland to visit a spectacular collection of wildlife and icebergs.

=== Season 10 ===
No. overall	No. in season	Title	Vessel type	Vessel operator	Narrator	Original release date
57	1	"MV Karadeniz Powership Yasin Bey"	Powership	Karpowership	Barbara Budd	7 January 2018
58	2	"MSC Oscar"	Container ship	Mediterranean Shipping Company	Barbara Budd	10 December 2017
59	3	"MS Norröna"	Ferry	Smyril Line	Barbara Budd	3 December 2017
60	4	"MSC Meraviglia"	Cruise Ship	MSC Cruises	TBA	17 December 2017
61	5	"Sapura 3500"	Pipe-Laying Ship	Sapura Energy	Barbara Budd	14 August 2018
62	6	"Edda Freya"	Subsea Construction Vessel	DeepOcean	Barbara Budd	14 August 2018

== Mighty Cruise Ships ==
Mighty Cruise Ships is a spin-off series in a similar style, with each episode about the operations and voyages of a different cruise ship. It was first broadcast in Canada during late 2014, and its final episode before being cancelled was on 12 January 2021.

=== Season 1 ===
No. overall	No. in season	Title	Vessel type	Vessel operator	Narrator	Original release date
1	1	"Paul Gauguin"	Cruise Ship	Paul Gauguin Cruises	Shauna MacDonald	9 November 2014
2	2	"Le Soléal"	Cruise Ship	Compagnie du Ponant	Shauna MacDonald	16 November 2014
3	3	"Azamara Journey"	Cruise Ship	Azamara Club Cruises	Shauna MacDonald	23 November 2014
4	4	"Celebrity Solstice"	Cruise Ship	Celebrity Cruises	Shauna MacDonald	30 November 2014
5	5	"Stella Australis"	Cruise Ship	Australis	Shauna Macdonald	7 December 2014
6	6	"Marco Polo"	Cruise Ship	Cruise & Maritime Voyages	Shauna MacDonald	14 December 2014

=== Season 2 ===
A second season of Mighty Cruise Ships aired on the Discovery Channel and repeated on the quest channel in the UK. Ships featured on this series included Carnival Vista, Royal Clipper, MV Viking Sea, MS Europa 2, MS Ocean Endeavour, MSC Divina.

No. overall	No. in season	Title	Vessel type	Vessel operator	Narrator	Original release date
7	1	"Carnival Vista"	Cruise ship	Carnival Cruise Line	Shauna MacDonald	12 February 2017
8	2	"Royal Clipper"	Cruise ship	Star Clippers	Shauna MacDonald	19 February 2017
9	3	"MV Viking Sea"	Cruise ship	Viking Ocean Cruises	Shauna MacDonald	26 February 2017
10	4	"MS Europa 2"	Cruise ship	Hapag-Lloyd	Shauna MacDonald	5 March 2017
11	5	"MS Ocean Endeavour"	Cruise ship	Kristina Cruises	Shauna MacDonald	12 March 2017
12	6	"MSC Divina"	Cruise ship	MSC Cruises	Shauna MacDonald	19 March 2017

=== Season 3 ===
No. overall	No. in season	Title	Vessel type	Vessel operator	Narrator	Original release date
13	1	"MS Koningsdam"	Cruise ship	Holland America Line	Shauna MacDonald	31 March 2019
14	2	"Viking Long Ships"	Cruise ship	Viking River Cruises	Shauna MacDonald	7 April 2019
15	3	"Regal Princess"	Cruise ship	Princess Cruises	Shauna MacDonald	14 April 2019
16	4	"MS Viking Star"	Cruise ship	Viking Ocean Cruises	Shauna MacDonald	21 April 2019
17	5	"Symphony of the Seas"	Cruise ship	Royal Caribbean International	Shauna MacDonald	28 April 2019
18	6	"MS Marina"	Cruise ship	Oceania Cruises	Shauna MacDonald	5 May 2019

=== Season 4 ===
No. overall	No. in season	Title	Vessel type	Vessel operator	Narrator	Original release date
19	1	"Seven Seas Explorer"	Cruise ship	Regent Seven Seas Cruises	Shauna MacDonald	25 November 2020
20	2	"AIDAnova"	Cruise ship	AIDA Cruises	Shauna MacDonald	1 December 2020
21	3	"Diamond Princess"	Cruise ship	Princess Cruises	Shauna MacDonald	8 December 2020
22	4	"MS Nieuw Statendam"	Cruise ship	Holland America Line	Shauna MacDonald	15 December 2020
23	5	"Costa Diadema"	Cruise ship	Costa Cruises	Shauna MacDonald	22 December 2020
24	6	"Norwegian Joy"	Cruise ship	Norwegian Cruise Line	Shauna MacDonald	29 December 2020
25	7	"MS Roald Amundsen"	Cruise ship	Hurtigruten	Shauna MacDonald	5 January 2020
26	8	"Sky Princess"	Cruise ship	Princess Cruises	Shauna MacDonald	12 January 2020

== Broadcasters ==
Country	Network(s)	Notes
Canada	Discovery Channel Canada	
Asia Pacific	Discovery HD World	All season including spin off
Australia	Seven Network; 7mate	
United Kingdom	Quest	
United States	HD Theater; Smithsonian Channel	
The Netherlands	Discovery Channel The Netherlands	
Belgium	Discovery Channel Belgium	
Spain	La Sexta HD	
