= Ponant =

Ponant may refer to:

== Geography ==
In French, ponant is the western cardinal point. It is an archaic French naval term for West, the opposite of Levant.

By extension :

1. the Ponant Sea could refer to the Atlantic Ocean (western sea area in relation to France) as opposed to the Levant Sea, which referred to the Mediterranean Sea (more to the east).
2. the Ponant Sea could refer to the western part of the Mediterranean Sea between the Spanish coast, the Balearic Islands, Sardinia and the North African coastline, as opposed to the Levantine Sea.

The meaning 1. gave its name or a nickname :

- to the Ponant Islands, a grouping of French island communities on the Atlantic Ocean coastline (including the English Channel);
- to Brest, sometimes called the port of Ponant.

== Maritime area ==
- Compagnie du Ponant, a French cruise line
- Le Ponant, a French luxury sailing yacht that has been the subject of piracy
- Ponant Fleet, the former Atlantic Fleet of the Royal French Navy

== Architecture ==
- Ponant Tower (Tour Ponant), one of Les Mercuriales twin towers in Paris, France

== See also ==
- Ponente, regional term for a westerly wind that blows in the Mediterranean
