= HMS Clyde (P257) =

River-class offshore patrol vessel of the Royal Bahraini Naval Force

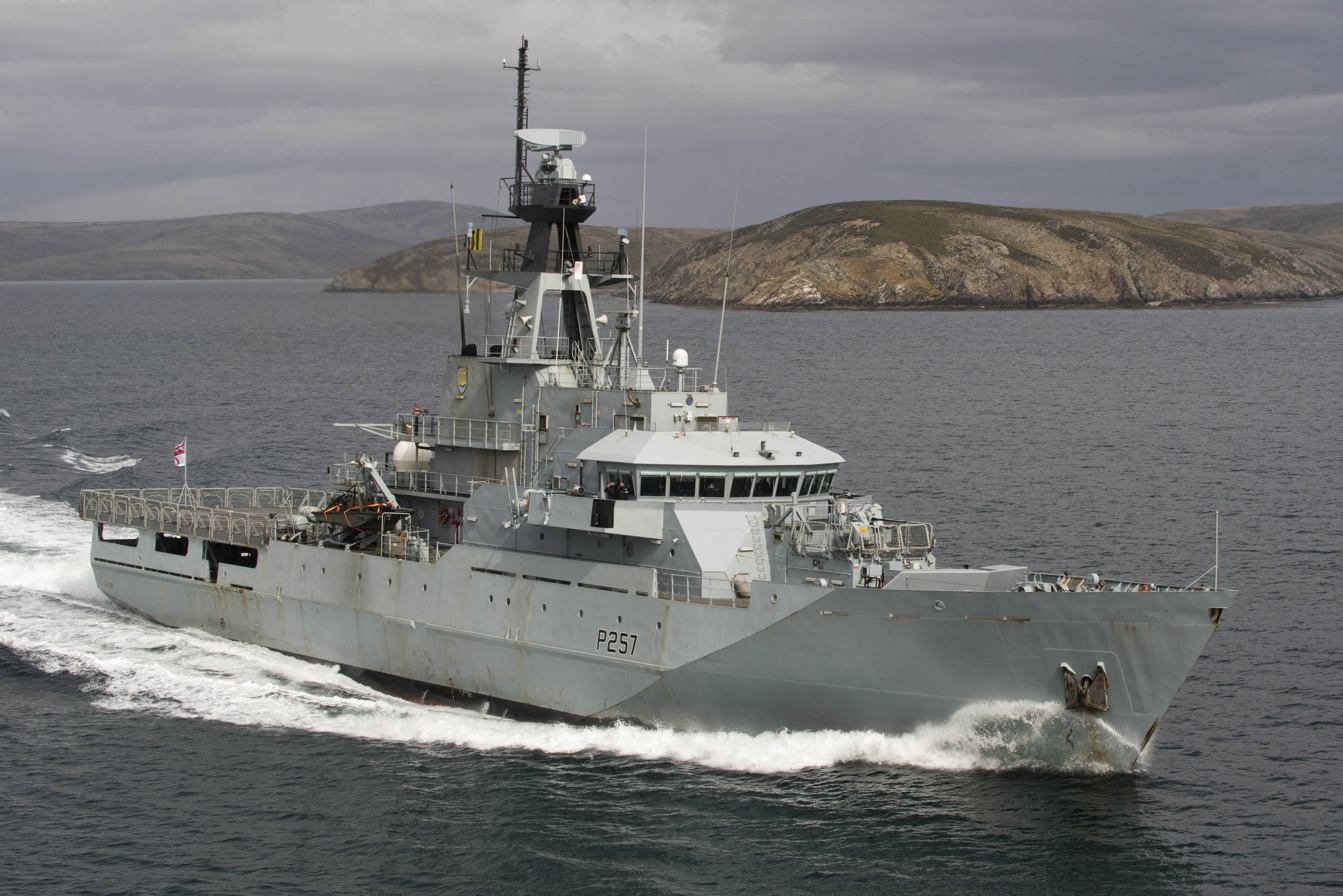
- HMS Clyde off The Falklands in 2014

History

United Kingdom
- Name: HMS Clyde
- Ordered: 2005
- Builder: VT Shipbuilding
- Laid down: 2005
- Launched: 14 June 2006
- Sponsored by: Lesley Dunt, wife of Vice Admiral Peter Dunt
- Commissioned: 30 January 2007
- Decommissioned: 20 December 2019
- Renamed: RBNS Al-Zubara
- Home port: HMNB Portsmouth
- Identification: IMO number: 9367425; MMSI number: 232729000; Callsign: GXRS; Pennant number: P257
- Motto: Clwo; "Strength"
- Fate: Transferred to Royal Bahrain Naval Force
- Badge

Bahrain
- Name: RBNS Al-Zubara
- Namesake: Al Zubarah
- Acquired: 7 August 2020
- Status: In service

General characteristics
- Class & type: River-class offshore patrol vessel
- Displacement: 1,850 to 2,000 tonnes.
- Length: 81.5 m (267 ft 5 in)
- Beam: 13.5 m (44 ft 3 in)
- Propulsion: Two Ruston 12RK 270 engines developing 4,125 kW (5,532 hp) at 1,000 rpm
- Speed: 21 knots (39 km/h; 24 mph)
- Range: 5,500 nmi (10,200 km; 6,300 mi)
- Endurance: 21 days
- Boats & landing craft carried: 1 × Pacific 22 RIB; 1 × Rigid Raider
- Troops: 20
- Complement: 36
- Armament: 1 × 30 mm DS30B gun; 2 × Miniguns; 5 × General purpose machine guns
- Aviation facilities: Merlin-capable flight deck

HMS Clyde (pennant number P257) was an offshore patrol vessel and was the tenth Royal Navy vessel to carry the name. She was launched on 14 June 2006 at HMNB Portsmouth by VT Group. It was the fourth vessel of the River class, with a displacement of 2,000 tonnes and a 30 mm Oerlikon KCB gun in place of the 20 mm gun fitted to Tyne River-class ships. Clyde was decommissioned on the 20 December 2019 at HMNB Portsmouth and was returned to her owners at BAE Systems Maritime - Naval Ships, although the ship remained under lease from BAE Systems to the Royal Navy until the end of March 2020. In August 2020 Clyde was transferred to the Kingdom of Bahrain.

== Operational history ==
Clyde was the first ship built entirely at HMNB Portsmouth for 40 years and has been constructed alongside the bow and superstructure sections for the new Type 45 destroyers Daring and Dauntless. She was named in a ceremony on 7 September 2006 as she did not receive a traditional launching ceremony.

HMS Clyde was commissioned into the Royal Navy in a ceremony at HMNB Portsmouth on 30 January 2007.

After being commissioned into active service HMS Clyde was sent to the South Atlantic to relieve HMS Dumbarton Castle as the Royal Navy's patrol vessel in the area based in the Falkland Islands. Unlike predecessors in this role Clyde stayed in South Atlantic waters, with a contract in place for her to remain in the Falkland Islands until 2018.

In January 2011, the government of Brazil denied HMS Clyde access to Rio de Janeiro in solidarity with Argentinian claims over the Falkland Islands sovereignty dispute, as Uruguay had done with HMS Gloucester the previous September.

On 18 November 2015, Clyde assisted in the rescue of 347 passengers and crew from the cruise ship Le Boreal drifting off the Falkland Islands after an engine room fire. At 21 knots (39 km/h; 24 mph), it took Clyde four hours to reach the stricken ship, which was off the north end of Falkland Sound. Clyde resupplied one of the two larger lifeboats with fuel and took on people from the smaller lifeboats, and then escorted them to Falkland Sound, where they transferred the passengers to Le Boreal's sister ship, L'Austral.

In January 2017, Clyde was dry docked in Simon's Town, South Africa for maintenance; her patrol duties were temporarily transferred to survey ship HMS Enterprise. On 21 September, HMS Clyde celebrated ten years in the South Atlantic with her only time off station being the maintenance periods in South Africa. In November, Clyde was redeployed from a patrol of South Georgia to assist in the search for the missing Argentinian submarine ARA San Juan.

== End of Royal Navy service ==
A parliamentary briefing paper released in October 2016 stated that HMS Clyde would leave service in 2017; however on 24 April 2017, in a written answer to a question raised by Nicholas Soames, Parliamentary Under-Secretary for Defence Harriett Baldwin stated Clyde would be decommissioned in 2019. Clyde was due to be replaced by the Batch 2 ship HMS Forth in 2018. However, later than originally planned, Forth relieved Clyde in late 2019. Clyde returned to Portsmouth after an absence 12 years on 20 December 2019 and was decommissioned on the same day.

== Transfer to Bahrain ==
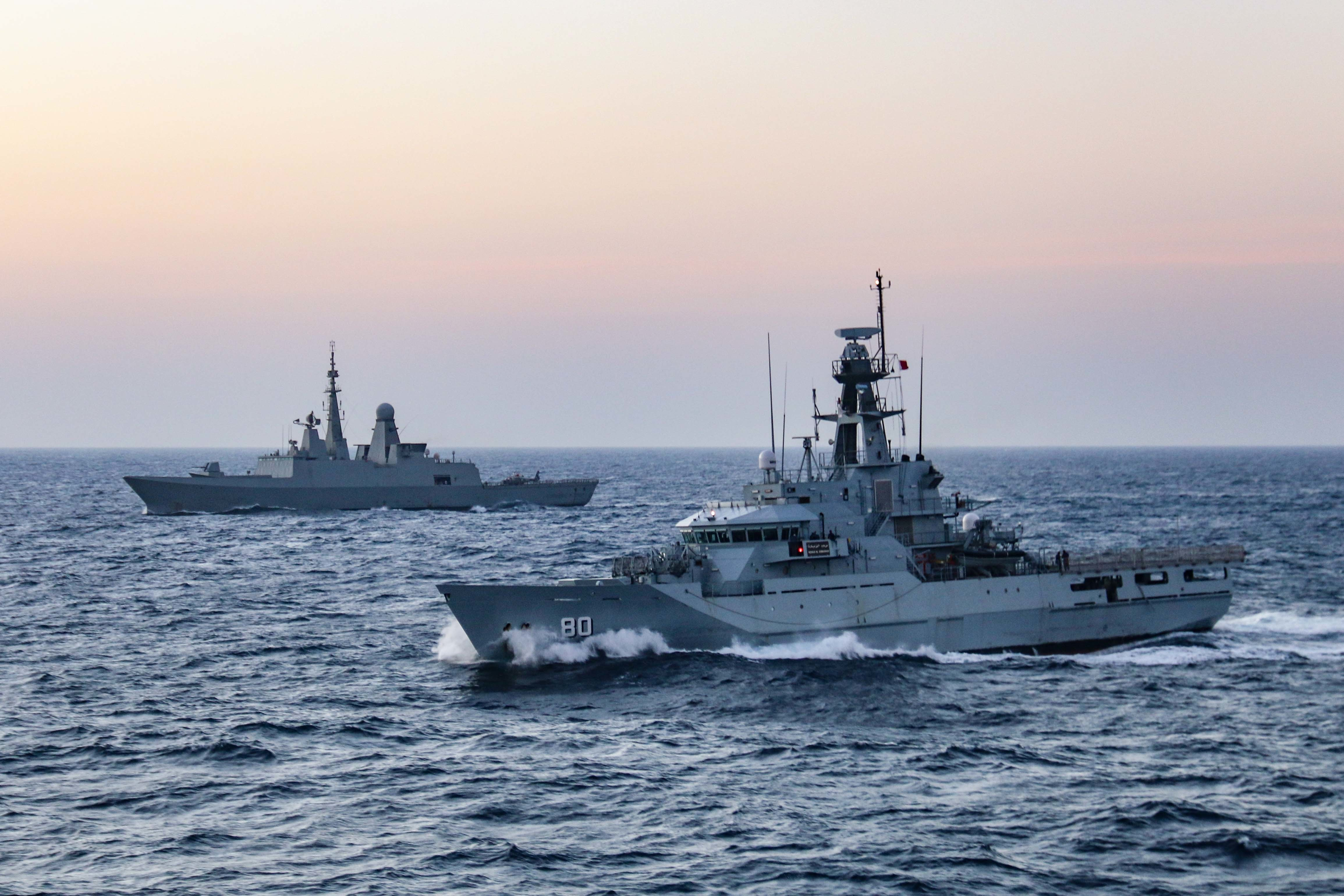
RBNS Al-Zubara transits the Bab el-Mandeb strait, November 2020

On 7 August 2020 it was announced in a ceremony held at HMNB Portsmouth, that Clyde had been transferred to the Royal Bahrain Naval Force, with the ship renamed as RBNS Al-Zubara. The ceremony was held in the presence of the Bahraini Ambassador to the UK and representatives of BAE Systems.
