= Le Boreal =

French cruise ship built in 2010

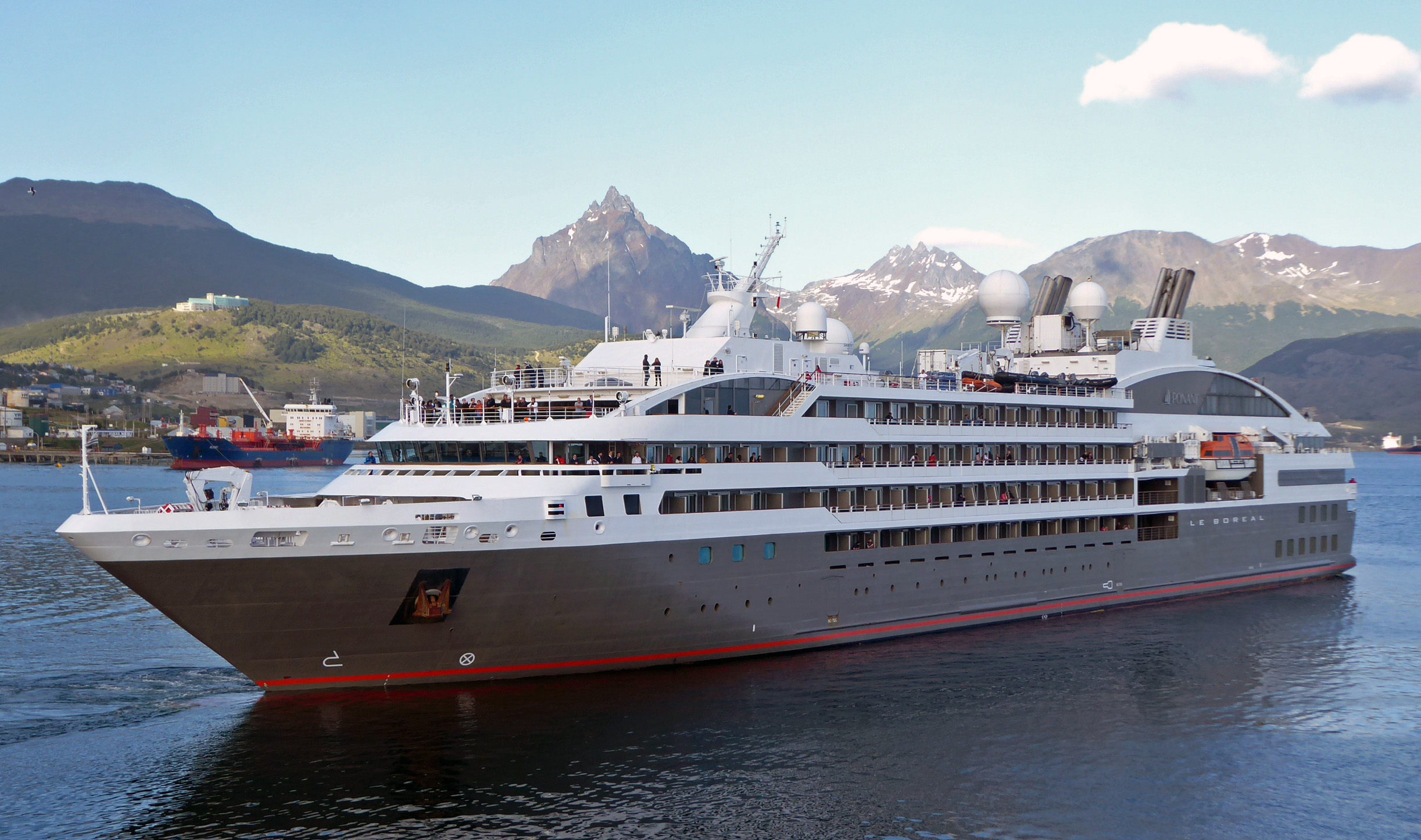
- Le Boreal in Ushuaia in 2019.

History

Wallis and Futuna
- Name: Le Boreal
- Owner: Compagnie du Ponant
- Operator: Compagnie du Ponant
- Port of registry: (Wallis and Futuna) Mata Utu
- Builder: Fincantieri (Ancona)
- Laid down: 22 April 2009
- Completed: 27 April 2010
- Identification: Call sign: FLSY; IMO number: 9502506; MMSI number: 578000500
- Status: In active service

General characteristics
- Type: Cruise ship
- Tonnage: 10,944 GT
- Length: 142.1 m (466 ft 2 in)
- Beam: 18 m (59 ft 1 in)
- Draught: 4.8 m (15 ft 9 in)
- Decks: 6 (guest decks)
- Capacity: 264 passengers
- Crew: 136

Le Boreal is a cruise ship owned and operated by the French cruise line company Compagnie du Ponant.

She cruises to Antarctica, Greenland, Svalbard, Canada and Mediterranean Sea.

== Design and description ==
The vessel is 142 metres (465 ft 11 in) in length, has 132 cabins and suites for 264 passengers and 136 crew members.

== Construction and career ==
Completed in 2010, she is a sister vessel of L'Austral, Le Lyrial and Le Soléal. Le Boreal entered service on 6 May 2010. Le Boreal is the lead ship of Le Boreal Series (LBS).

Between 25 February and 6 March 2018, video journalist and podcaster Brady Haran OAM conducted an expedition to Antarctica aboard this vessel.

=== 2015 engine room fire ===
On 18 November 2015 Le Boreal suffered a major engine room fire which caused the loss of all power and left her drifting. The captain ordered the ship, with 347 passengers and crew, to be abandoned early in the morning. A distress call was issued just after 2 a.m. while it was near Cape Dolphin, the northerly point of East Falkland, Falkland Islands. The news agency reported that 90 of the ship's 347 passengers and crew were air-lifted to safety from life rafts. The sister ship L'Austral responded to the distress call and took on some passengers.

Working closely with the Falkland Islands Government, British forces enacted a major search and rescue plan. Two Sea King Royal Air Force Search and Rescue helicopters were scrambled, along with two other support helicopters, a C-130 Hercules and a Voyager aircraft for command and control. The Royal Navy patrol vessel HMS Clyde was dispatched to the scene, as were two Dutch tugs which support British forces in the Falkland Islands. Subsequently, all passengers and crew from Le Boreal were accounted for and being looked after on the Falkland Islands. The vessel was later reported in a stable condition and the tugs were assisting to bring her alongside in the Falkland Islands for a detailed assessment of her condition. In March 2016, Ponant confirmed that Le Boreal would resume service in May. The investigators' report was released in July 2016, and attributed the fire to a ship's officer's misidentification of a clogged fuel filter; the report noted that the officer did not have a mechanic's rating, and Ponant subsequently changed several work rules in response to the report.

== In popular culture ==
Le Boreal was featured in episode three of the fifth season of the TV series Mighty Ships. The ship was shown taking tourists to South Georgia and the Antarctic Peninsula.

Boreal was the name used for the ship on the "Yacht" map in the game Tom Clancy's Rainbow Six Siege (Black Ice season from February 2016) before changing its name to Aklark.
