= Le Jacques Cartier =

French cruise ship

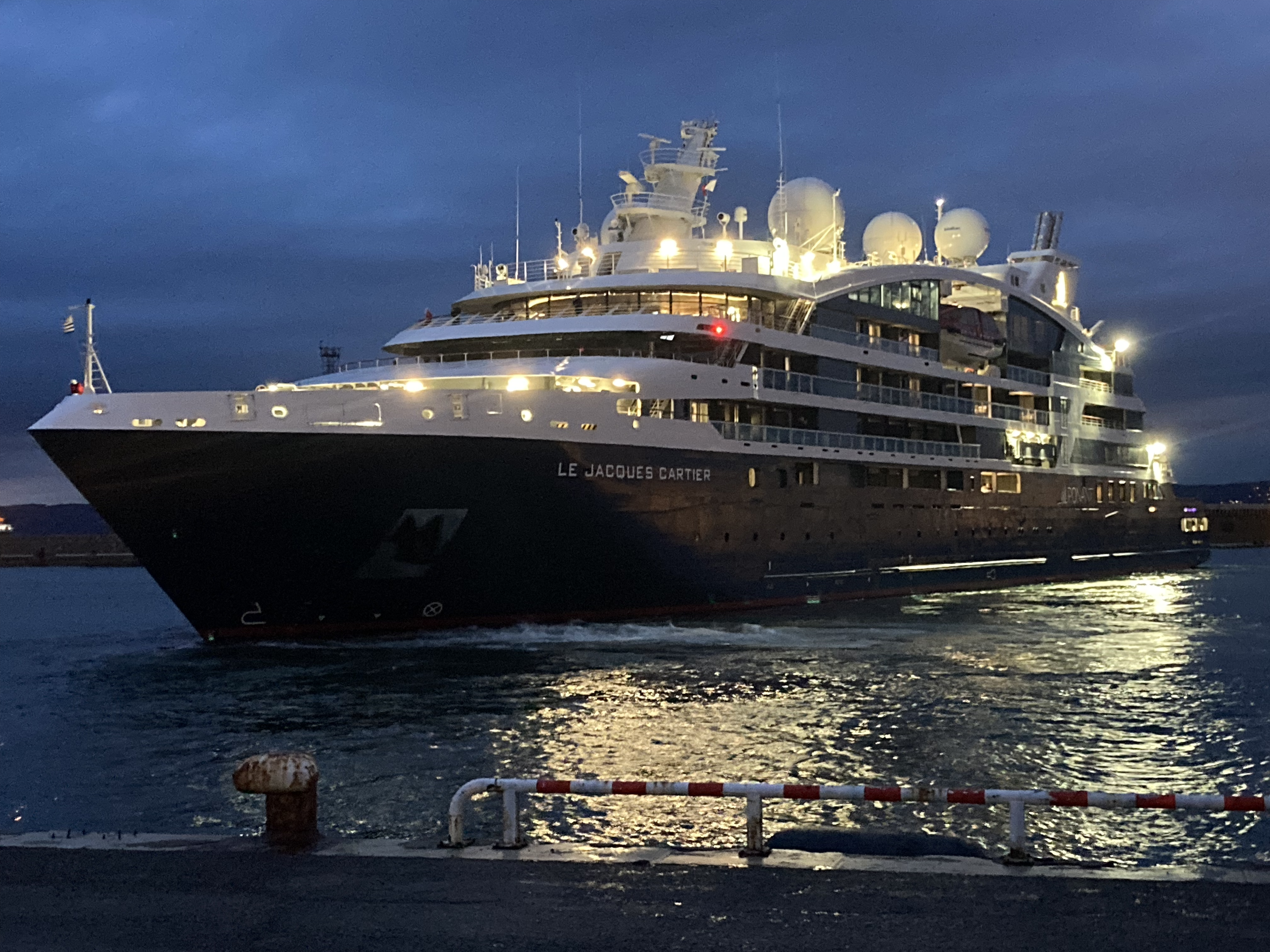
- Le Jacques Cartier leaving Marseille, 30 October 2021

History

Wallis and Futuna
- Name: Le Jacques Cartier
- Operator: Ponant
- Port of registry: (Wallis and Futuna) Mata Utu
- Builder: VARD Tulcea, Romania (hull); VARD Søviknes, Norway (outfitting)
- Laid down: 4 April 2018
- Acquired: 10 July 2020
- Identification: IMO number: 9852420; MMSI number: 578001400; Callsign: FLYQ
- Status: In service

General characteristics
- Class & type: Ponant Explorers-class cruise ship
- Capacity: 184 passengers

Le Jacques Cartier is the sixth ship of the Ponant Explorers class of cruise ships operated by Ponant. Each member of the class has been allocated the name of a famous French explorer. Initially, the sixth ship in the class was named Le Surville, after Jean-François-Marie de Surville, a French trader and navigator. However, before entering service she was renamed Le Jacques Cartier, after Jacques Cartier, a French-Breton explorer.

Ponant's order for Le Surville (as she was then named) and a sister ship, the fifth of the class, was announced in March 2018. The hull of each ship was constructed by VARD in the builder's Tulcea yard in Romania; the steel cutting ceremony for both ships took place on 4 April 2018. Upon completion, the hulls were transferred to the builder's Søviknes facility in Ålesund, Norway, for final outfitting.

Following her renaming, Le Jacques Cartier was delivered to Ponant on 10 July 2020.
