= Le Dumont-d'Urville =

French cruise ship

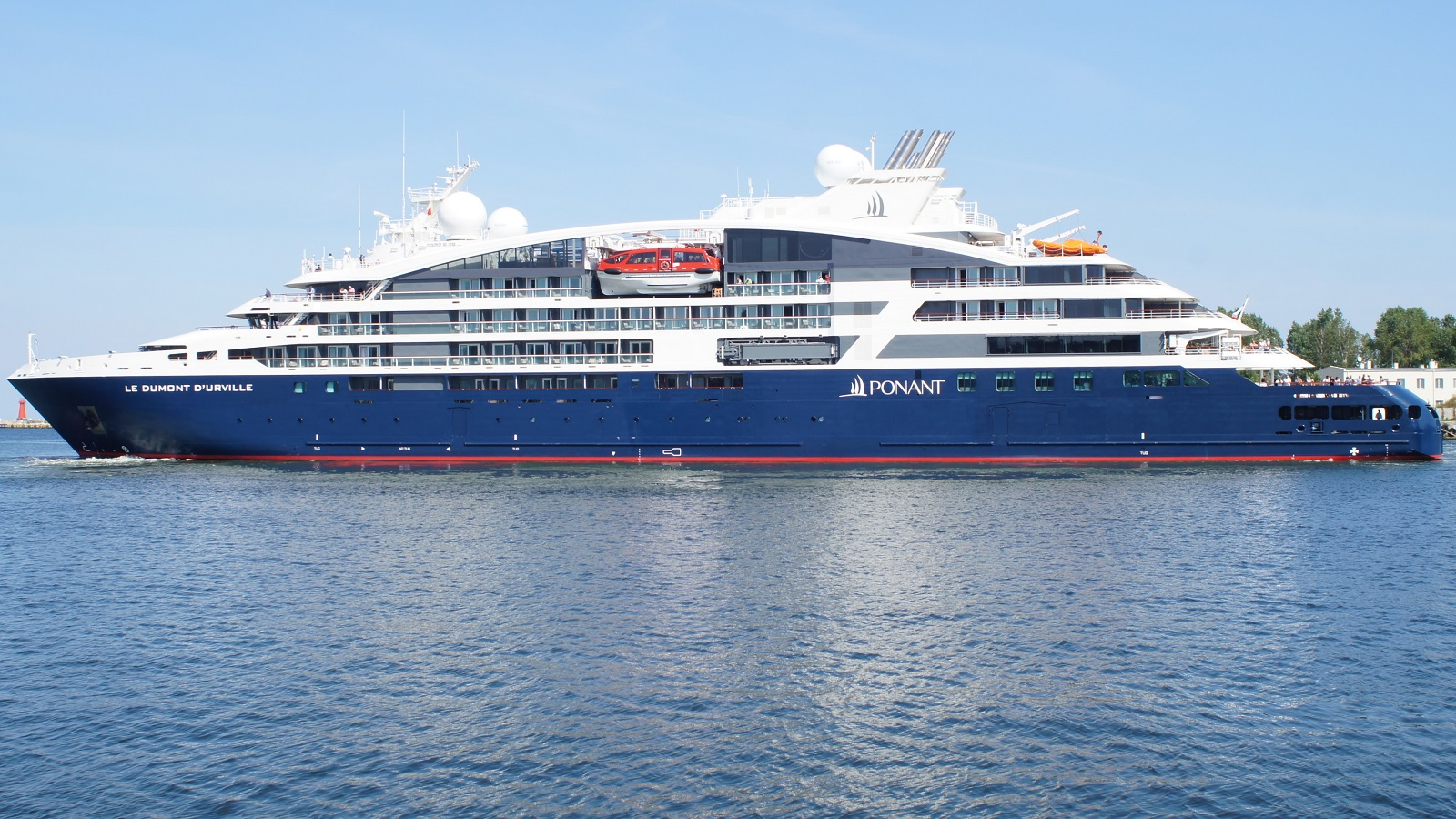
- Le Dumont-d'Urville in Gdańsk, 23 August 2019

History

Wallis and Futuna
- Name: Le Dumont-d'Urville
- Operator: Ponant
- Port of registry: (Wallis and Futuna) Mata Utu
- Builder: VARD Tulcea, Romania (hull); VARD Søviknes, Norway (outfitting)
- Yard number: 851
- Acquired: 14 June 2019
- Maiden voyage: 7 August 2019
- Identification: IMO number: 9814052; MMSI number: 578001200; Callsign: FLDS
- Status: In service

General characteristics
- Class & type: Ponant Explorers-class cruise ship
- Capacity: 184 passengers

Le Dumont-d'Urville is the fourth ship of the Ponant Explorers class of cruise ships operated by Ponant. Each member of the class has been allocated the name of a famous French explorer. Initially, the fourth ship in the class was to have been named Le Kerguelen, after explorer and naval officer Yves-Joseph de Kerguelen-Trémarec. However, before entering service she was renamed Le Dumont-d'Urville, after Jules Dumont d'Urville, another explorer and naval officer.

Built by VARD, Le Dumont-d'Urville had her hull constructed in VARD's Tulcea yard in Romania. She was then transferred to the builder's Søviknes facility in Ålesund, Norway, for final outfitting.

Le Dumont-d'Urville was delivered to Ponant in Norway on 14 June 2019, and was due to begin her maiden voyage on 7 August 2019.
