= Le Lapérouse =

French cruise ship

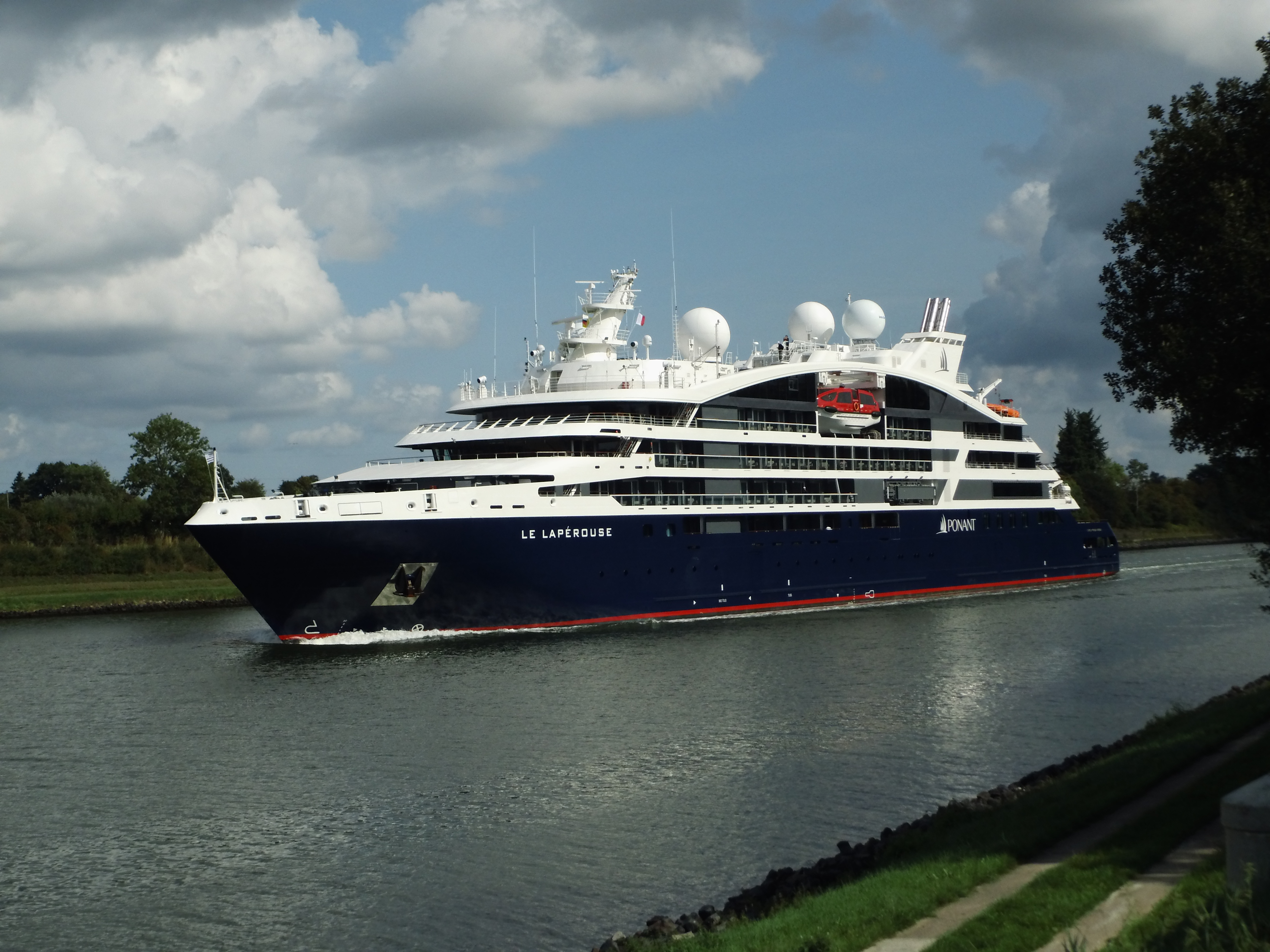
- Le Lapérouse in the Kiel Canal, 31 August 2018

History

Wallis and Futuna
- Name: Le Lapérouse
- Operator: Ponant
- Port of registry: (Wallis and Futuna) Mata Utu
- Builder: VARD Tulcea, Romania (hull); VARD Søviknes, Norway (outfitting)
- Yard number: 848
- Laid down: 1 March 2017
- Launched: 18 December 2017
- Sponsored by: Maryvonne Pinault
- Christened: 10 July 2018
- Acquired: 15 June 2018
- Maiden voyage: 19 June 2018
- Identification: IMO number: 9814026; MMSI number: 578000900; Callsign: FLBD
- Status: In service

General characteristics
- Class & type: Ponant Explorers-class cruise ship
- Length: 131.06 m (430 ft)
- Beam: 17.98 m (59 ft)
- Draught: 4.57 m (15 ft)
- Decks: 5
- Installed power: 6 400 KW
- Propulsion: 2 X 2 000 KW PEM
- Speed: 6 400 KW
- Capacity: 184 passengers

Le Lapérouse is the lead ship of the Ponant Explorers-class of cruise ships operated by Ponant. Each member of the class has been allocated the name of a famous French explorer, and Le Lapérouse is named after naval officer Jean-François de Galaup, comte de Lapérouse.

== History ==
Built by VARD, Le Lapérouse had her keel laid down at VARD's Tulcea yard in Romania on 1 March 2017. She was floated out on 18 December 2017, and was then finally outfitted at the builder's Søviknes facility in Ålesund, Norway. After successful sea trials that began in May 2018, she was delivered to Ponant in Ålesund on 15 June 2018.

The following day, 16 June 2018, Le Lapérouse departed for Reykjavík, Iceland, where she commenced her maiden cruise on 19 June 2018. She was christened by Maryvonne Pinault, the wife of French billionaire businessman François Pinault, at a ceremony in Hafnarfjörður, Iceland, on 10 July 2018.

=== 2021: New Zealand ===
In late January 2021, it was reported the New Zealand-based tourism company Wild Earth Travel had chartered Le Lapérouse to run small expeditions around the country commencing 30 January. The cruise ship applied for visa exemptions to enter New Zealand due to COVID-19 border restrictions. While Immigration New Zealand granted the ship and essential crew visa exemptions, 60 hospitality staff were denied visa exemptions on the grounds that they needed to hire New Zealanders. Though the hospitality crew were denied visa exemptions twice, Le Lapérouse still sailed for New Zealand. In response to media interest, Immigration Minister Kris Faafoi defended Immigration New Zealand's decision, stating that Le Lapérouse should have waited for the department to process its crew's visa applications before sailing for New Zealand. The ship was instructed to return its hospitality crew to New Caledonia in order to re-enter New Zealand.
