= Le Commandant Charcot =

French icebreaking cruise ship

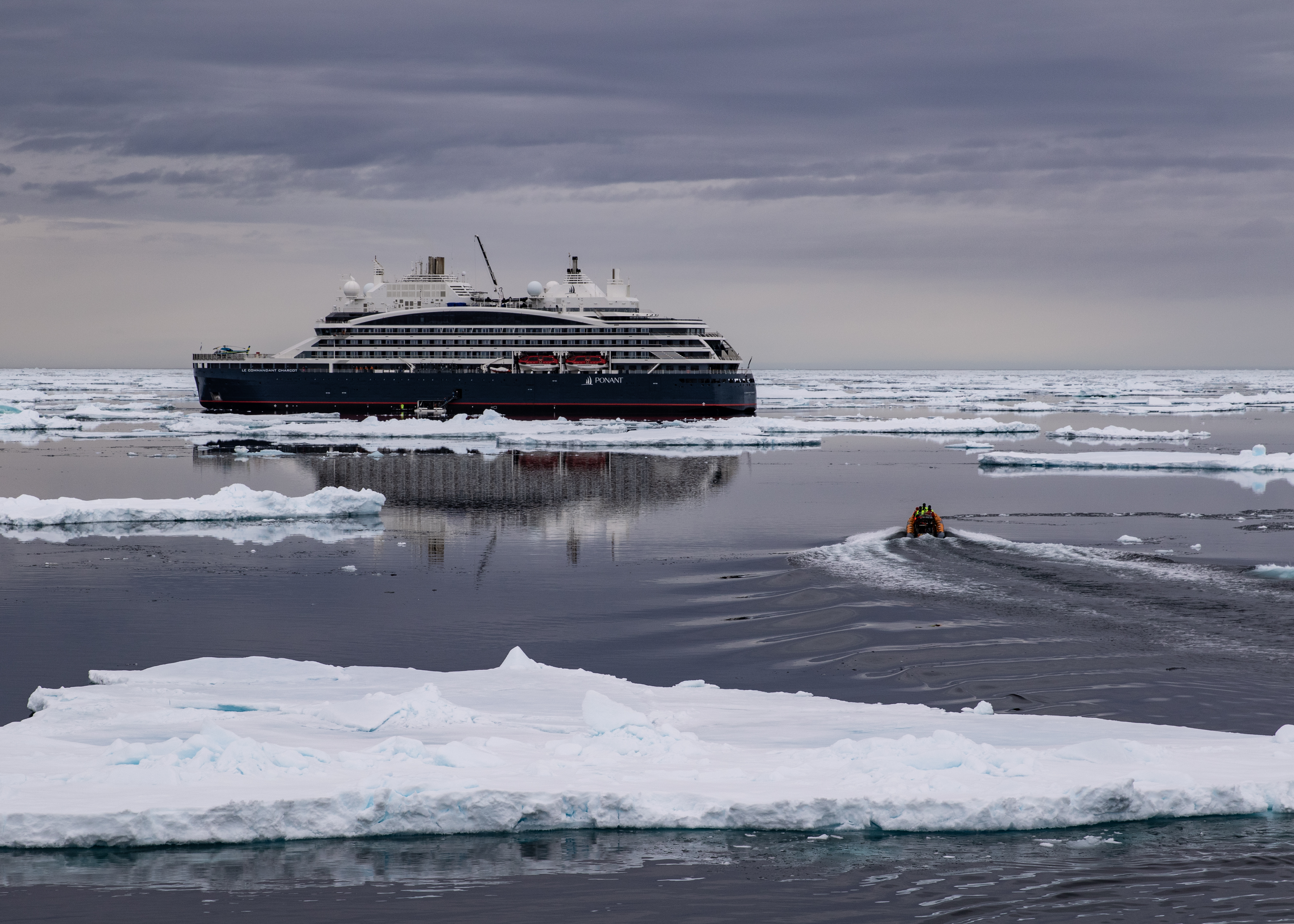
- Le Commandant Charcot during Operation Tugaalik on 23 June 2024

History

Wallis and Futuna
- Name: Le Commandant Charcot
- Namesake: Jean-Baptiste Charcot
- Owner: Compagnie du Ponant
- Port of registry: (Wallis and Futuna) Mata Utu
- Builder: Vard Tulcea, Romania (hull); Vard Søviknes, Norway (outfitting)
- Cost: NOK 2.7 billion
- Laid down: December 2018
- Launched: March 2020
- Completed: July 2021
- Identification: IMO number: 9846249
- Status: In service

General characteristics
- Type: Cruise ship
- Tonnage: 31,283 GT
- Length: 150 m (492 ft 2 in)
- Beam: 28.3 m (92 ft 10 in)
- Draught: 10 m (32 ft 10 in)
- Ice class: Polar Class 2; BV Icebreaker 3 (bow); BV Icebreaker 4 (stern)
- Installed power: 4 × Wärtsilä 14V31DF (4 × 7,700 kW); 2 × Wärtsilä 10V31DF (2 × 5,500 kW); 5 MWh batteries
- Propulsion: Diesel-electric; two ABB Azipod propulsion units (2 × 17 MW)
- Speed: 15 knots (28 km/h; 17 mph) (open water)
- Capacity: 270 passengers in 135 cabins
- Crew: 187

Le Commandant Charcot (French: [l(ə) kɔmɑ̃dɑ̃ ʃaʁko]) is an icebreaking cruise ship operated by the French shipping company Compagnie du Ponant. Named after the French polar scientist Jean-Baptiste Charcot, the vessel was built at Vard Tulcea shipyard in Romania, from where she was moved to Søviknes for final outfitting and delivery in 2021.

== Description ==
Le Commandant Charcot is a Polar Class 2 rated icebreaking vessel capable of reaching remote polar destinations such as the Geographic North Pole. She features a hybrid power plant powered by liquefied natural gas (LNG) and 5 MWh electric batteries, capable of briefly driving the ship without engines running.

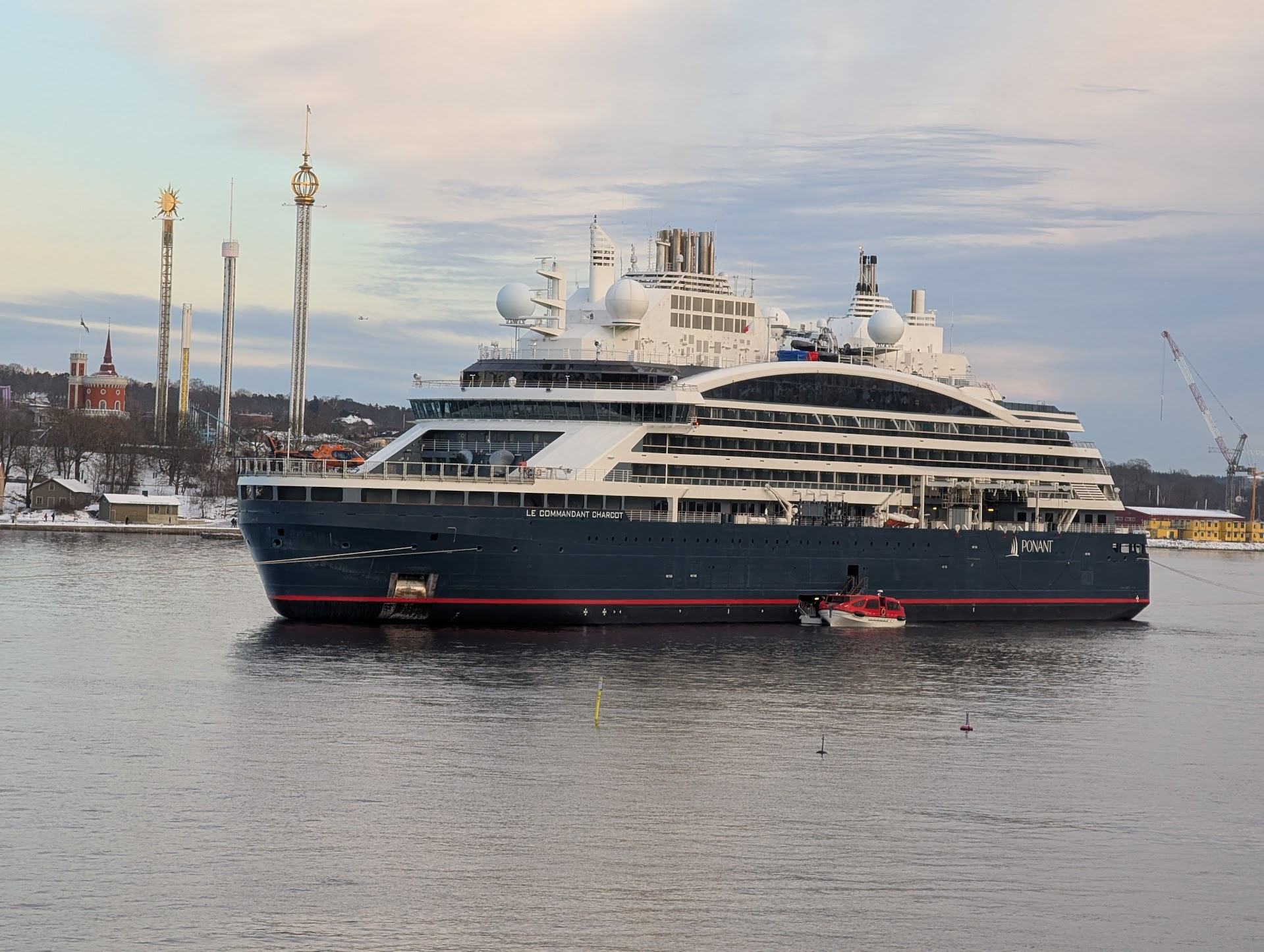
Le Commandant Charcot at Stockholm

== Design and construction ==
The ship was launched in March 2020 and left the yard in Romania on 29 March, heading for Norway. She arrived at VARD shipyard in Søvik, Haram, Norway on 28 April 2020. In June 2021, she was in the Arctic for the first time during sea trials.

== Notable events ==
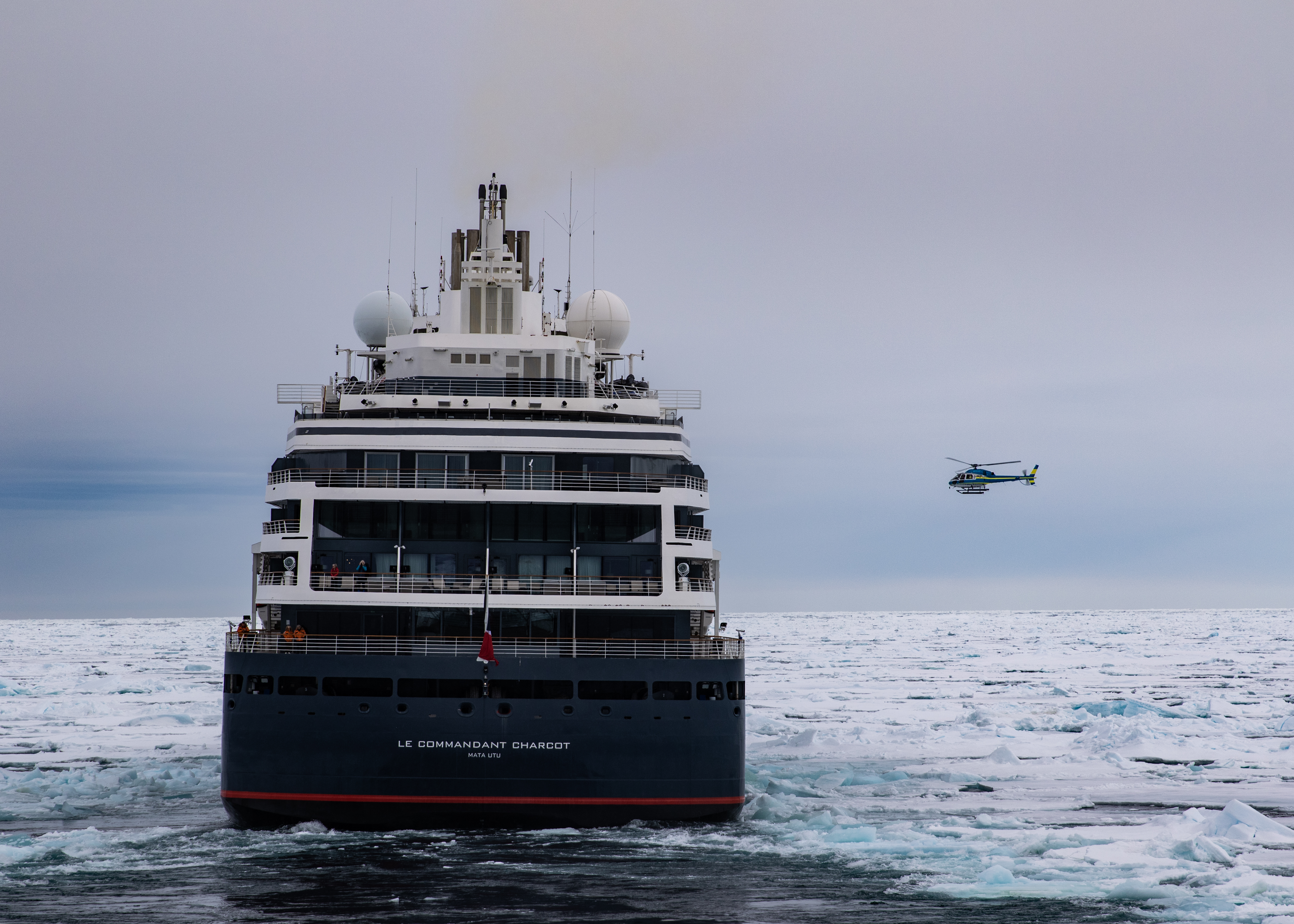
Le Commandant Charcot during Operation Tugaalik on 23 June 2024

After delivery on 29 July 2021, Le Commandant Charcot sailed from mainland Norway to Svalbard and from there to the Geographic North Pole, where she arrived on 6 September 2021.

In December 2021, the ship went on a 16-day exploration cruise from Ushuaia, Argentina to the Weddell Sea and Antarctic Peninsula, allowing passengers to experience a total solar eclipse from the Weddell Sea ice pack.

In February 2022, Le Commandant Charcot collaborated with the British Antarctic Survey research vessel RRS Sir David Attenborough in Antarctica. The cruise ship, capable of breaking much thicker ice, created a channel for the research vessel in second-year ice covered with thick layer of snow in Stange Sound.

In late July 2022, Le Commandant Charcot accompanied the Norwegian polar research vessel Kronprins Haakon to the North Pole.

In June 2024, Le Commandant Charcot participated in a multinational rescue and assistance exercise Operation Tugaalik together with the Royal Danish Navy frigate HDMS Triton, French Navy offshore support and assistance vessel Rhône, and Icelandic Coast Guard offshore patrol vessel ICGV Þór.

On 12 September 2024, Le Commandant Charcot became the first ship to reach the northern pole of inaccessibility, the point within the Arctic Ocean farthest from any landmass, during a transarctic voyage from Alaska to Svalbard. On the same voyage, the ship also passed through the north magnetic pole on 13 September and Geographic North Pole on 15 September.
