= Le Bougainville =

French cruise ship

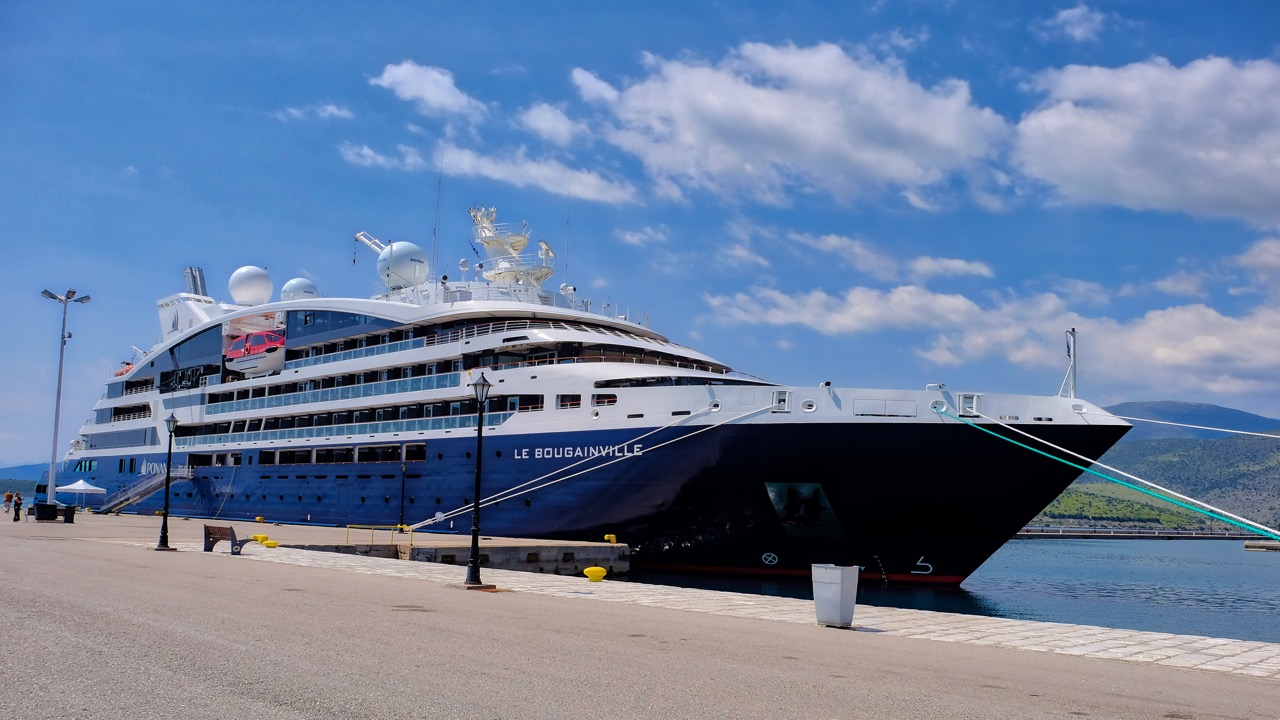
- Le Bougainville in Itea, Greece, 21 April 2019

History

Wallis and Futuna
- Name: Le Bougainville
- Operator: Ponant
- Port of registry: (Wallis and Futuna) Mata Utu
- Builder: VARD Tulcea, Romania (hull); VARD Søviknes, Norway (outfitting)
- Yard number: 850
- Acquired: April 2019
- Maiden voyage: 15 April 2019
- Identification: IMO number: 9814040; MMSI number: 578001300; Callsign: FLDT
- Status: In service

General characteristics
- Class & type: Ponant Explorers-class cruise ship
- Capacity: 184 passengers

Le Bougainville is the third ship of the Ponant Explorers-class of cruise ships operated by Ponant. Each member of the class has been allocated the name of a famous French explorer, and Le Bougainville is named after Louis Antoine de Bougainville, a French admiral and explorer.

Built by VARD, Le Bougainville had her hull constructed in VARD's Tulcea yard in Romania. By October 2018, she was ready to be transferred to the builder's Søviknes facility in Ålesund, Norway, for final outfitting. She was delivered to Ponant in Norway in early April 2019.

On 8 April 2019, Le Bougainville departed from Søvik, Norway, for Malaga, Spain, where she began her maiden voyage on 15 April 2019. She was christened on 4 June 2019 in Marseille.
