= Ocean Diamond =

Expedition cruise ship

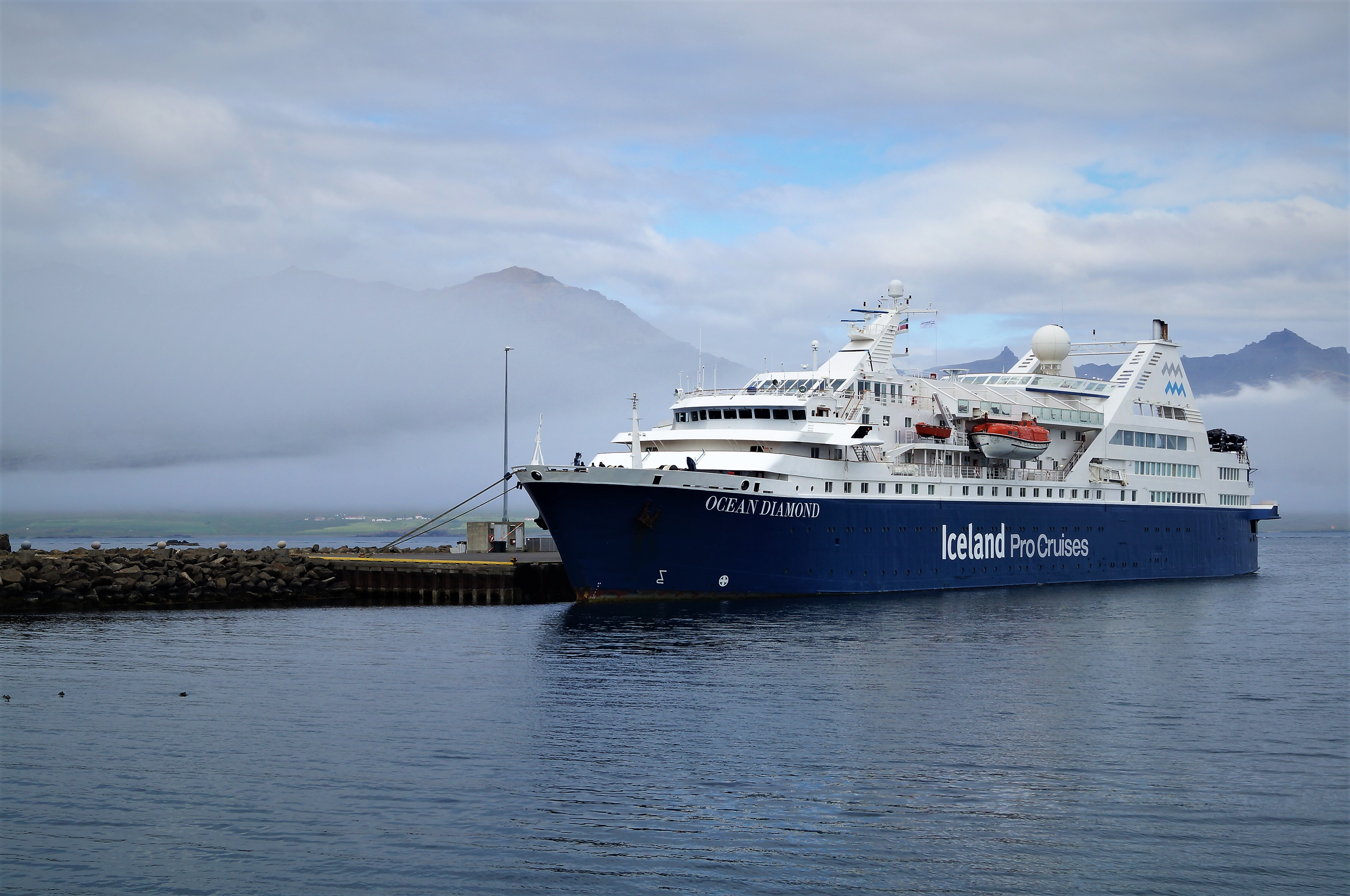
- Ocean Diamond in Djúpivogur harbor (Iceland)

History
- Name: Diamond XI
- Owner: Bridgemans Floatel, Ex Manager: International Shipping Partners
- Port of registry: Madeira, Portugal
- Builder: KMV, Kristiansand, Norway
- Yard number: 220
- Launched: 26 March 1973
- Completed: 14 February 1974, rebuilt 1986
- Identification: Call sign: C6ZR5; IMO number: 7325629; MMSI number: 311063900
- Fate: Scrapped

General characteristics
- Tonnage: 8,282 GRT
- Displacement: 3,433 DWT
- Length: 124.19 m (407.4 ft)
- Beam: 16.03 m (52.6 ft)
- Decks: 8
- Ice class: 1D
- Installed power: 2 x Wichmann Diesel, 7,375 horsepower
- Speed: 15.5 knots
- Capacity: 200
- Crew: 144

Diamond XI was a cruise ship renamed in 2024, previously operated by Quark Expeditions as Ocean Diamond. She was previously named Song of Flower, Explorer Starship and Le Diamant.

In late 2011, Compagnie du Ponant sold the ship to investors who transferred the ship to Quark Expeditions. Quark has operated the ship as the Ocean Diamond since November 2012. In August 2024, the Diamond XI was seen beached in Aliağa, Turkey for scrap.

== Expert in Residence program ==
Ocean Diamond had an Expert in Residence program, which enabled scientists, polar researchers, historians and other experts to undertake field work from the ship. The experts included Jonathan Shackleton, Falcon Scott, and Sue Flood. Passengers were able to assist the experts in their work.
