= North Pole '85 =

Upcoming Icelandic documentary film

- Directed by: Orly Orlyson; Rafnar Orri
- Produced by: The Exploration Museum
- Cinematography: Elvar Egilsson
- Production company: Pólfarar
- Country: Iceland
- Languages: English; Icelandic

North Pole '85 is an upcoming Icelandic documentary film that retraces a little-known 1985 expedition to the North Pole undertaken by astronaut Neil Armstrong and mountaineer Edmund Hillary, alongside explorers Steve Fossett, Patrick Morrow, Peter Hillary and expedition leader Mike Dunn.

Filming took place in 2025 at the North Pole and on the Arctic Ocean, as well as in Svalbard and Iceland. The documentary is produced by The Exploration Museum in Húsavík, Iceland, with support from the French expedition company Compagnie du Ponant. It is scheduled for release in 2026.

== Synopsis ==
The film documents a return to the North Pole forty years after Armstrong and Hillary's original expedition. It follows their descendants, including Neil's son Mark Armstrong and Edmund's son Peter Hillary, as they journey aboard the icebreaker Le Commandant Charcot to honor their fathers’ legacy and reflect on environmental change in the Arctic.

== Production ==
The documentary is produced by The Exploration Museum in Húsavík, Iceland, through its production company Pólfarar. Sony provided 8K digital cinema cameras for filming at the North Pole in July 2025. Filming also took place on the Arctic Ocean pack ice, in Longyearbyen and Húsavík. Ponant, operator of Le Commandant Charcot, collaborated with the filmmakers and hosted the expedition that served as the setting for the film.

== See also ==
- Neil Armstrong
- Edmund Hillary
