= Le Lyrial =

French cruise ship built in 2015

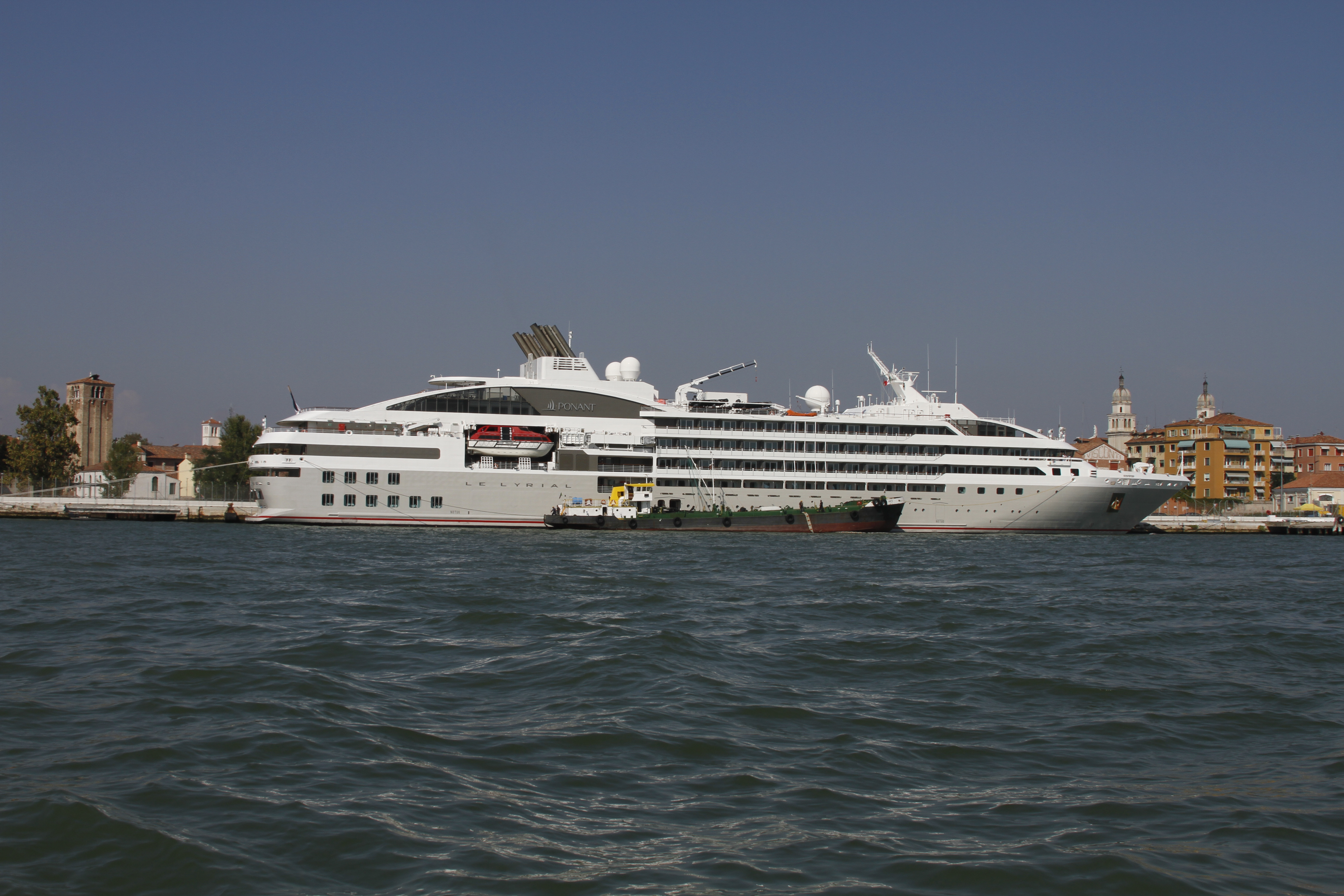
- Le Lyrial moored in Venice in 2016

History

Wallis and Futuna
- Name: Le Lyrial
- Operator: Ponant
- Port of registry: (Wallis and Futuna) Mata Utu
- Ordered: 2012
- Builder: Fincantieri (Ancona)
- Laid down: 2014
- Launched: 2015
- Acquired: 11 April 2015
- In service: April 2015
- Identification: IMO number: 9704130; MMSI number: 578000800; Callsign: FIRS
- Status: In service

General characteristics
- Class & type: Le Boreal-Class Cruise Ship
- Tonnage: 10,700 GT
- Length: 142 metres
- Beam: 18 metres
- Draught: 4.8 metres
- Decks: 7
- Propulsion: 2 propeller shafts: 2 propellers
- Speed: 16 knots (Max.)
- Capacity: 264 passengers
- Crew: 139 crewmembers

Le Lyrial is a cruise ship built by Fincantieri in Ancona, Italy, for Compagnie du Ponant. It was delivered on 11 April 2015, and operated its inaugural cruise in May 2015.

The name of the ship refers to the Lyra constellation in the northern hemisphere.

== Architecture and equipment ==
=== Accommodation ===
Le Lyrial has 122 cabins and suites. All of them have sea views, and 94 percent feature a private balcony. An entire deck of the ship is devoted solely to suites, some of which are larger than those on the vessel's three older sister ships. Even Le Lyrial's lowest-category Superior Stateroom is 21 m^{2} (230 sq ft) in area; Deluxe Staterooms have an area of 19 m^{2} (200 sq ft) and a 4 m^{2} (43 sq ft) balcony.

=== Machinery and technology ===
According to Fincantieri, Le Lyrial is equipped with the latest environmentally-friendly technology, such as an energy-saving LED lighting system. Additionally, Le Lyrial has such low levels of vibration and noise that it has been categorised as "Comfort Class" by its classification society, Bureau Veritas.
