= Paul Gauguin Cruises =

Cruise line

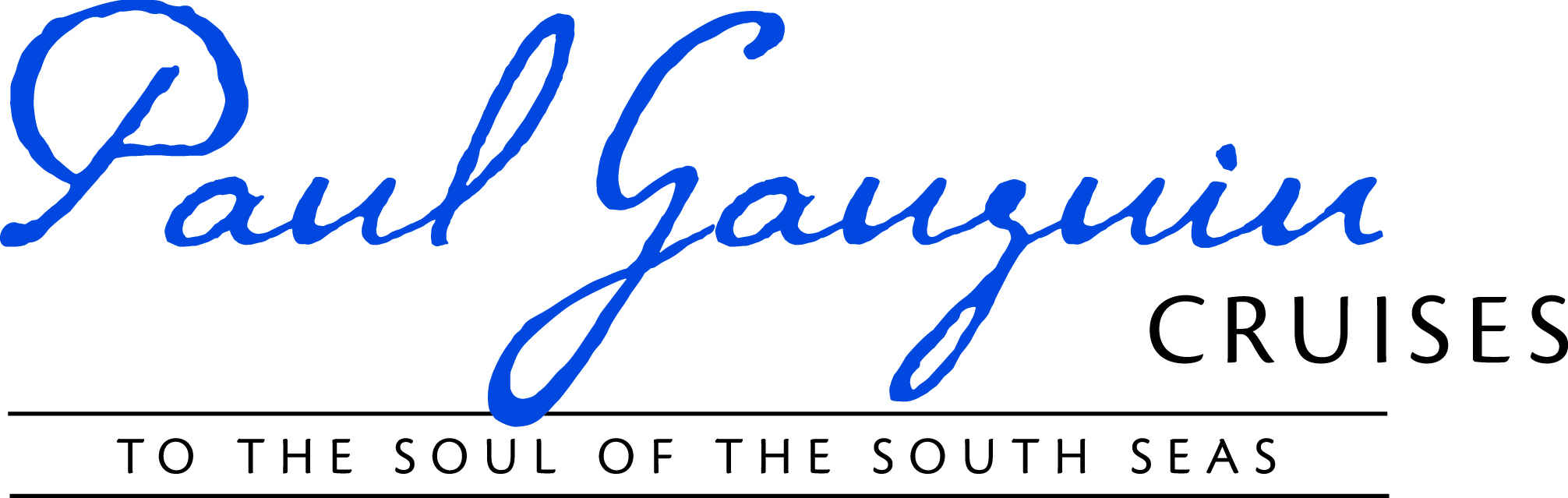
- Type: Subsidiary of Compagnie du Ponant
- Industry: Transportation
- Founded: 1998
- Headquarters: New York, NY, United States
- Area served: Tahiti, French Polynesia, South Pacific and the Mediterranean, Caribbean & Latin America.
- Key people: Samuel Chamerlain, CEO Americas for PONANT Explorations and Paul Gauguin Cruises
- Products: Cruises
- Parent: Compagnie du Ponant
- Website: http://www.pgcruises.com

Paul Gauguin Cruises is a cruise line owned by Compagnie du Ponant. It was owned by Beachcomber Croisieres Limited until 2019, being purchased by French company Compagnie du Ponant. Paul Gauguin Cruises operates cruises with one ship of the same name to Tahiti, French Polynesia, and South Pacific islands.

The cruise line is named after the 19th century painter Paul Gauguin, who spent ten years living with and painting the people and nature of Polynesia.

== History ==
The Paul Gauguin and Paul Gauguin Cruises had been operating under Regent Seven Seas Cruises from 1998–2010 until Pacific Beachcomber took over Paul Gauguin Cruises and its ship in January 2010. The parent company, Beachcomber Croisieres Limited, had previously acquired the cruise line in 2009. On September 30, 2011 the company announced the acquisition of a second ship. The ship was christened as Tere Moana in December 2012. In June 2015, the company announced the sale of the Tere Moana, leaving the Paul Gauguin as its only ship.

In 2019 the cruise line was purchased by Compagnie du Ponant. In late 2019, Ponant finalised a contract with Fincantieri's VARD yards to construct two hybrid vessels scheduled for delivery in 2022. The vessels will be of the same design as Ponant's current explorer class. However, they will feature batteries to support the ships' energy requirements during port visits and while visiting environmentally sensitive locations. The ships will have a gross tonnage of 11,000 and carry 230 passengers.

During the COVID-19 pandemic, the Paul Gauguin did not sail for some time but resumed operations on July 18, 2020 for local residents and on July 29 for international guests, with reduced occupancy.

== Destination ==
Paul Gauguin sails year-round to Tahiti & Society Islands, Cook Islands, French Polynesia, Fiji, Marquesas, Tonga, Tuamotus, Australia & New Zealand.

== Fleet ==
=== Current fleet ===
Ship	Built	Builder	Entered service for Paul Gaugiin	Gross Tonnage	Flag	Notes
Paul Gauguin	1997	Chantiers de I'Atlantique	2010–Present	19,200 tons	Bahamas	

=== Future fleet ===
Ship	Delivery	Builder	Gross Tonnage	Capacity	Flag	Notes
TBA	2022	VARD	11,000	230	Bahamas	Hybrid ship. 7th ship in Ponant's Explorer Class
TBA	2022	VARD	11,000	230	Bahamas	Hybrid ship. 8th ship in Ponant's Explorer Class

=== Previous fleet ===
Ship	Built	Builder	Entered service for Paul Gaugiin	Gross Tonnage	Flag	Notes
Tere Moana	1998	Alstom Leroux, St. Malo, France	2012–May 2016	3,500 tons	Bahamas	Sailed as Le Levant for Compagnie du Ponant until 2012. The Tere Moana had its final sailing as a Paul Gauguin Cruise on May 14, 2016.
