= Le Champlain =

French cruise ship

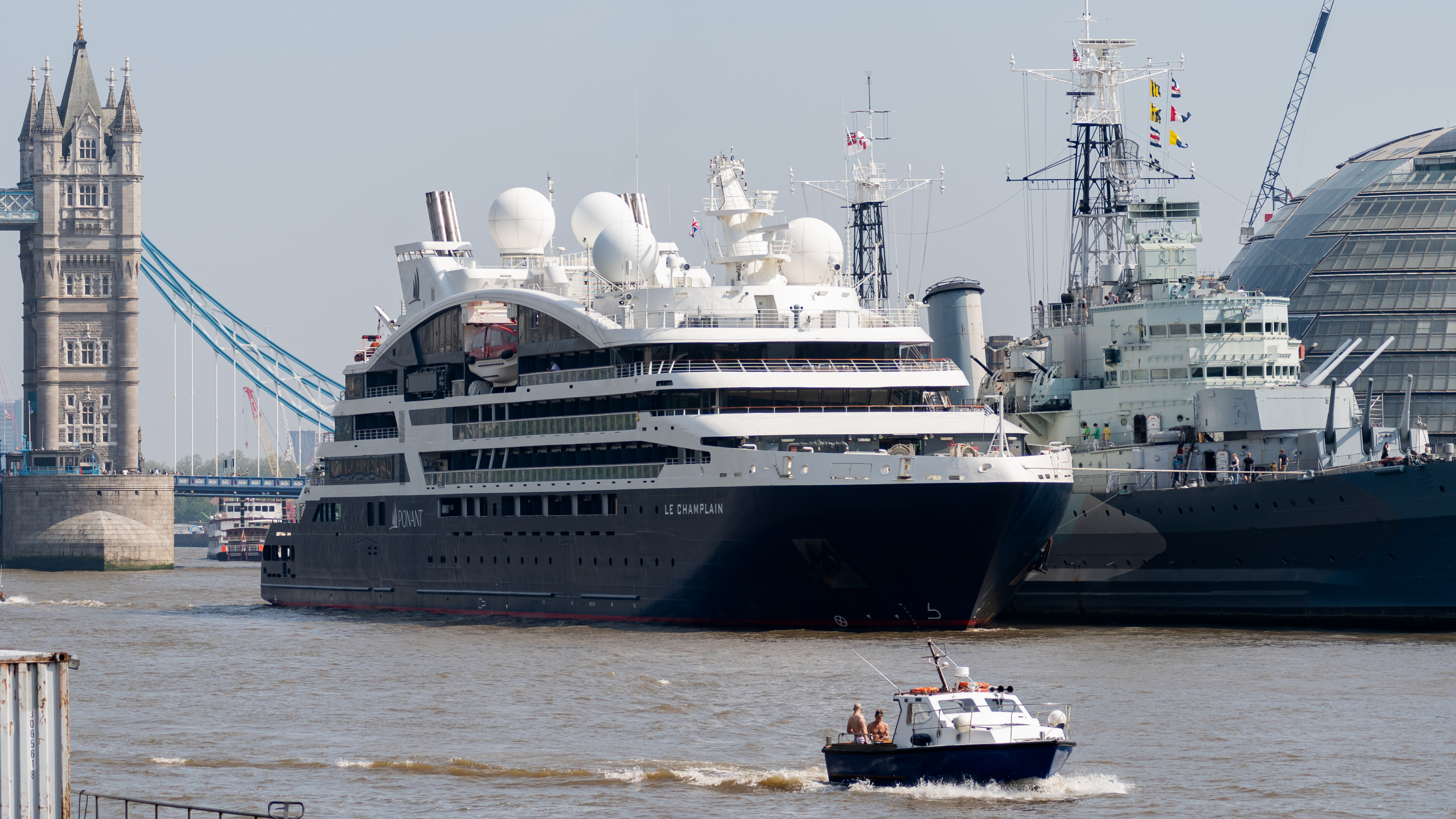
- Le Champlain moored with HMS Belfast, in The Thames, 11 May 2024

History

Wallis and Futuna
- Name: Le Champlain
- Operator: Ponant
- Port of registry: (Wallis and Futuna) Mata Utu
- Builder: VARD Tulcea, Romania (hull); VARD Søviknes, Norway (outfitting)
- Yard number: 849
- Laid down: 20 April 2017
- Launched: 29 March 2018
- Acquired: 27 September 2018
- Maiden voyage: 25 October 2018
- Identification: IMO number: 9814038; MMSI number: 578001100; Callsign: FLBP
- Status: In service

General characteristics
- Class & type: Ponant Explorers-class cruise ship
- Capacity: 180 passengers

Le Champlain is the second ship of the Ponant Explorers-class of cruise ships operated by Ponant. Each member of the class has been allocated the name of a famous French explorer, and Le Champlain is named after Samuel de Champlain, "The Father of New France".

Built by VARD, Le Champlain had her hull constructed in VARD's Tulcea yard in Romania, where her keel was laid down on 20 April 2017. A year and one week later, on 27 April 2018, she arrived at the builder's Søviknes facility in Ålesund, Norway, for final outfitting. She was delivered to Ponant in Ålesund on 27 September 2018.

On 25 October 2018, Le Champlain departed from Honfleur, France on her maiden voyage to Lisbon, Portugal.
