= Le Bellot =

French cruise ship

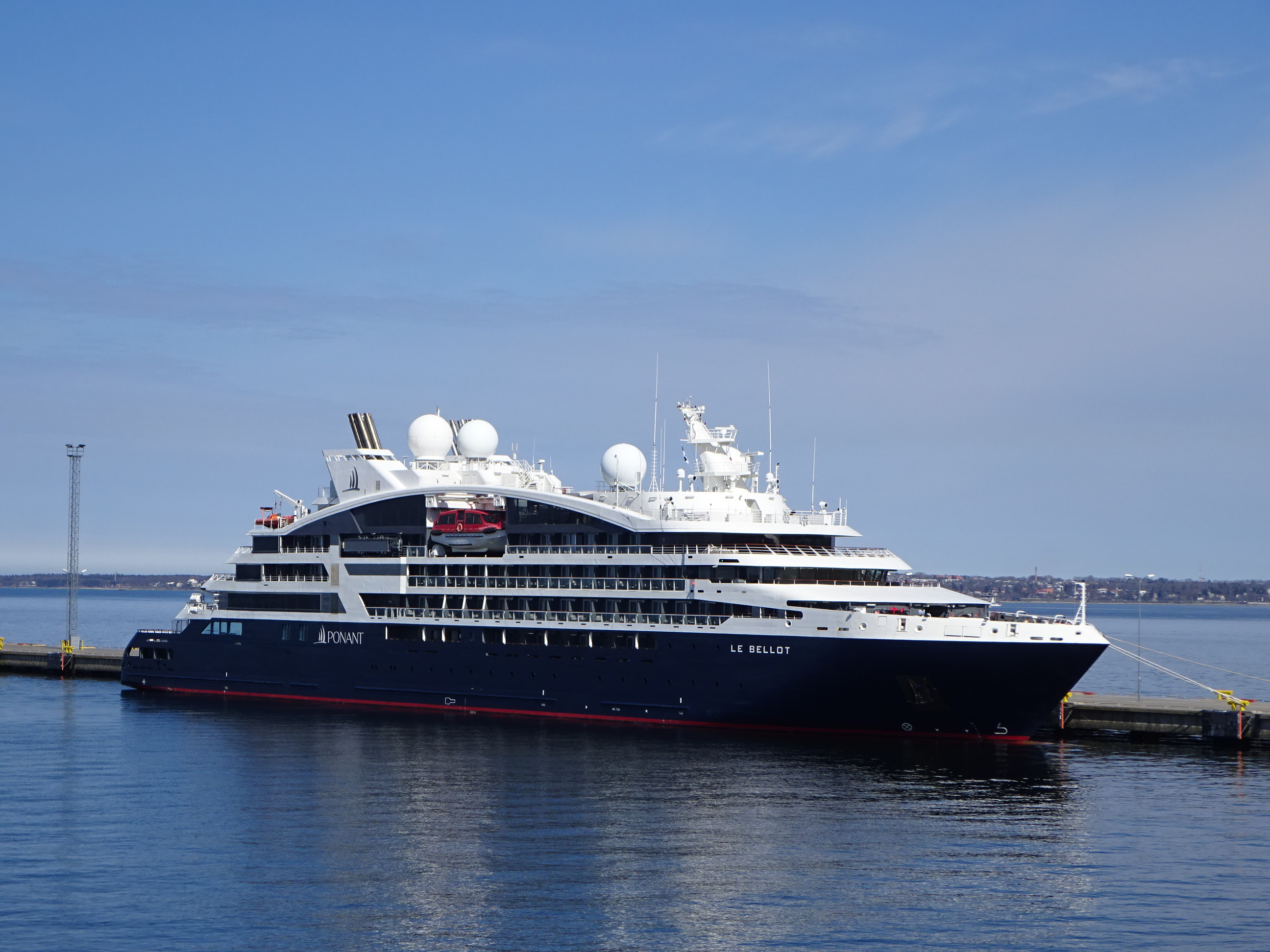
- in Port of Tallinn

History

Wallis and Futuna
- Name: Le Bellot
- Operator: Ponant
- Port of registry: (Wallis and Futuna) Mata Utu
- Builder: VARD Tulcea, Romania (hull); VARD Søviknes, Norway (outfitting)
- Laid down: 4 April 2018
- Acquired: March 2020
- Identification: IMO number: 9852418; MMSI number: 578001500; Callsign: FLZG
- Status: In service

General characteristics
- Class & type: Ponant Explorers-class cruise ship
- Capacity: 184 passengers

Le Bellot is the fifth ship of the Ponant Explorers class of cruise ships operated by Ponant. Each member of the class has been allocated the name of a famous French explorer, and Le Bellot is named after Joseph René Bellot, a French naval officer and Arctic explorer.

Ponant's order for Le Bellot and a sister ship, the sixth of the class, was announced in March 2018. The hull of each ship was constructed by VARD in the builder's Tulcea yard in Romania; the steel cutting ceremony for both ships took place on 4 April 2018. Upon completion, the hulls were transferred to the builder's Søviknes facility in Ålesund, Norway, for final outfitting.

Le Bellot was delivered to Ponant in March 2020.
