= L'Austral =

French cruise ship built in 2010

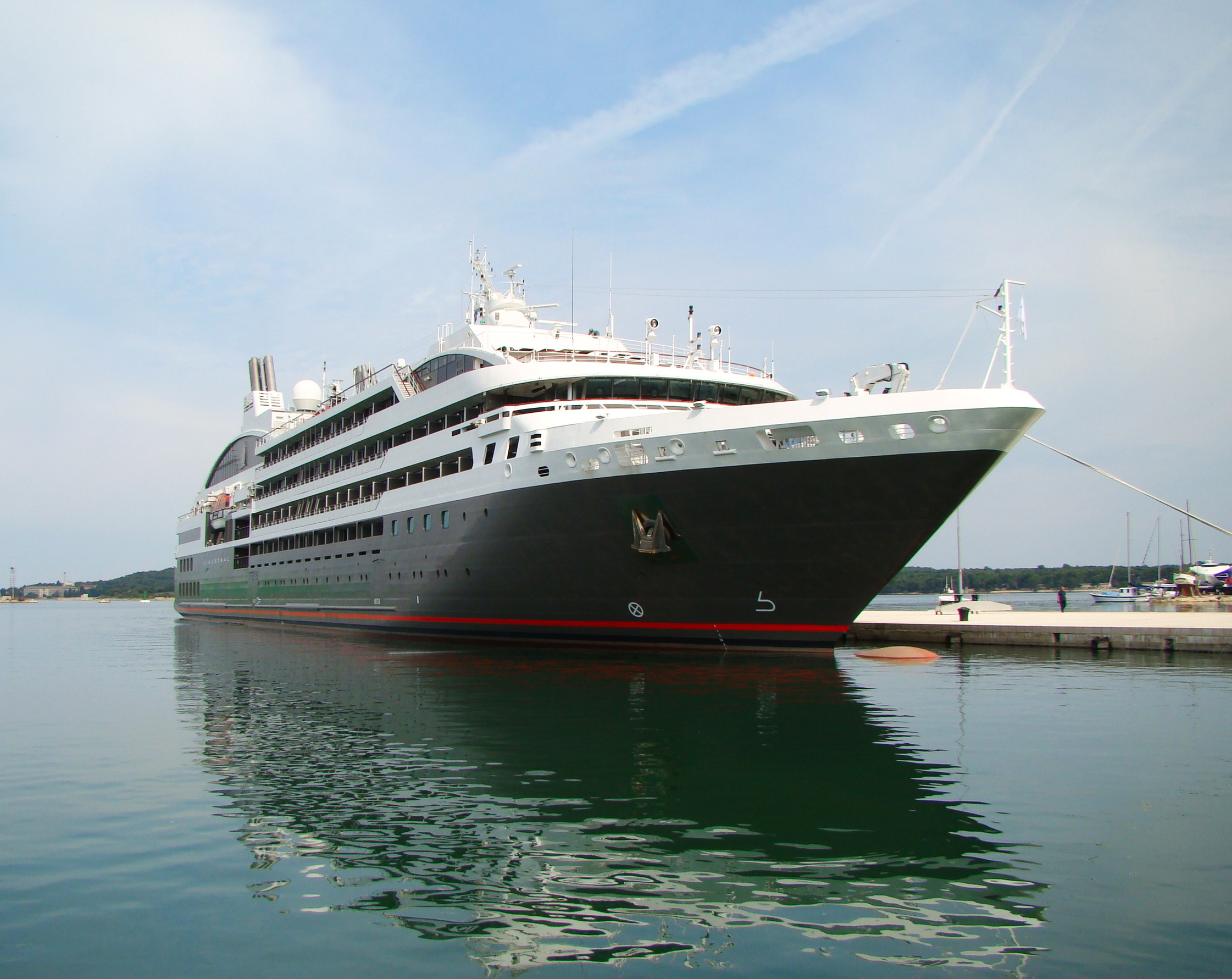
- L'Austral in Pula in 2011

History

Wallis and Futuna
- Name: L'Austral
- Operator: Ponant
- Port of registry: (Wallis and Futuna) Mata Utu
- Builder: Fincantieri
- Launched: 25 March 2010
- Completed: 30 September 2010
- Identification: IMO number: 9502518; MMSI number: 578000700; Callsign: FLTU
- Status: In service

General characteristics
- Tonnage: 10,700 GT
- Length: 142 m (466 ft)
- Beam: 18 m (59 ft)
- Draft: 4.7 m (15 ft)
- Decks: 6 (guest decks)
- Capacity: 264 passengers
- Crew: 136

L'Austral is a cruise ship operated by the French cruise line company Compagnie du Ponant. It is the sister vessel of Le Boréal and Le Soléal, being the same weight, length and breadth, along with having 132 cabins and suites for 264 passengers and 140 crew members like the other two ships. L'Austral was built in 2010 at Fincantieri's Ancona shipyard, Italy. L'Austral was put into service on April 20, 2011.

On 9 February 2017, L’Austral collided with a stony bank near Milford Sound, New Zealand.

In 2018, Compagnie du Ponant and ship master of the L'Austral, Captain Regis Daumesnil, were charged by both Maritime NZ and the Department of Conservation (DoC) for "or endangering human life and entering a prohibited zone" following the grounding of the cruise ship L'Austral on an uncharted rock near North East Island, the main island of the Snares Islands group, on 9 January 2017. The grounding resulted in the L'Austral's hull being punctured in three places. With damage to the ship's hull, Captain Daumesnil sailed 285km south to the Auckland Islands rather than seek the nearest port in Bluff, New Zealand. The captain was fined NZ $30,000 and Ponant fined NZ $70,000.
