= Le Ponant =

French cruise ship

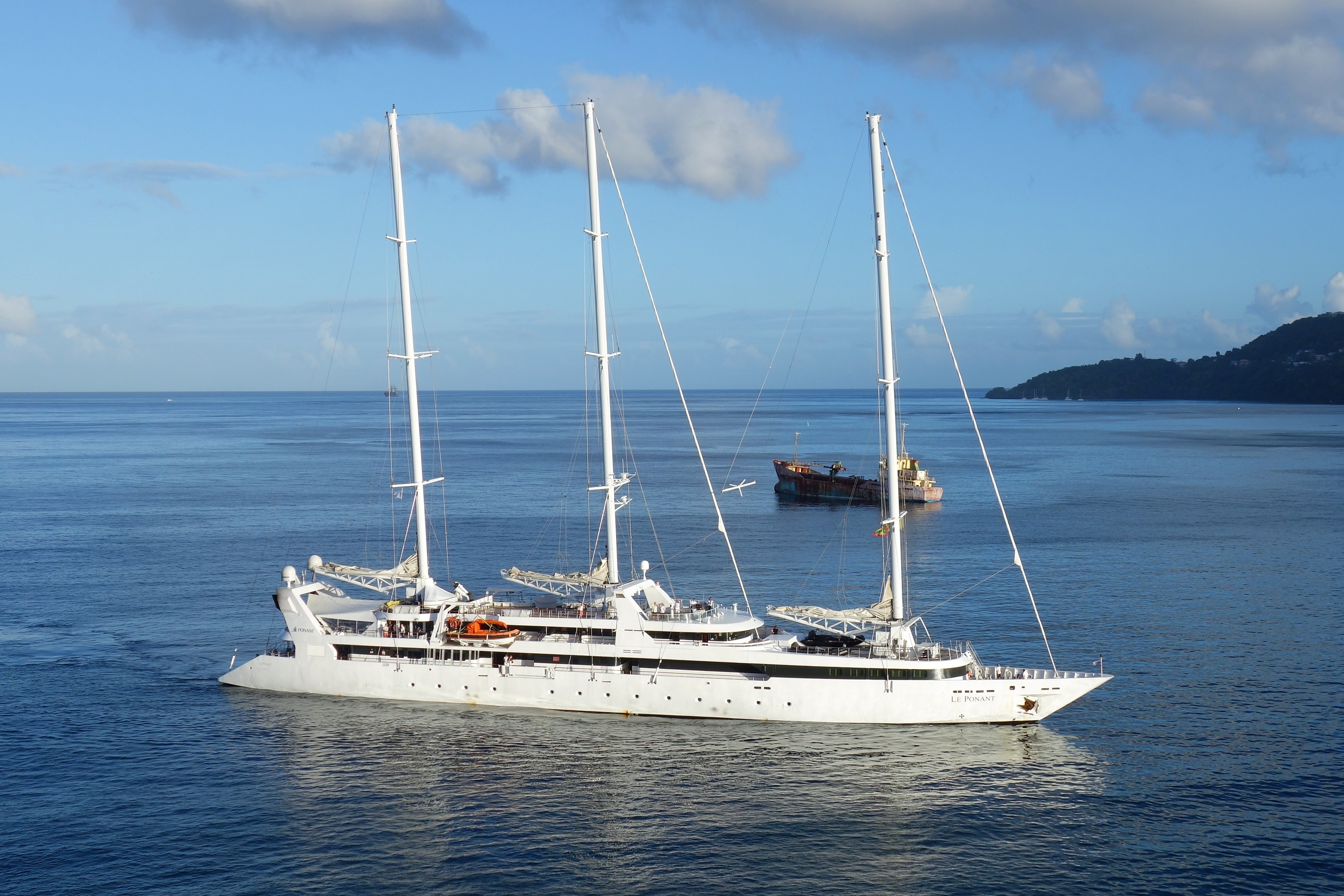
- Le Ponant in Grenada in 2017

History

Wallis and Futuna
- Name: Le Ponant
- Operator: Compagnie du Ponant
- Port of registry: (Wallis and Futuna) Mata Utu
- Builder: SFCN, France
- Completed: 1991
- Identification: IMO number: 8914219 MMSI number 227186000 Call sign FGZZ
- Status: In service

General characteristics
- Type: Luxury yacht
- Tonnage: 1,489 GT
- Length: 88 m (288 ft 9 in)
- Beam: 12 m (39 ft 4 in)
- Draft: 4 m (13 ft 1 in)
- Decks: 3 (passenger accessible)
- Installed power: 2,200 hp (1,600 kW) motor and sails
- Propulsion: 1 propeller; 1,500 m^{2} (16,000 sq ft) sail area
- Sail plan: Three masts
- Capacity: 67 passengers
- Crew: 30

Le Ponant is a three-masted, commercially operated French luxury yacht operated by Compagnie du Ponant. The ship has capacity for up to 32 passengers in 16 cabins. It was built in 1991 by the Societe Francaise de Construction Navales (SFCN) shipyard in Villeneuve-la-Garenne, France. In 2008, the ship was attacked by Somali pirates and was only released after a military intervention. In 2022, the yacht was refitted for increased environmental protection to a design by Jean-Philippe Nuel Studio.

== Description ==
On board, Le Ponant has one restaurant. Le Diamant panoramic restaurant offers buffet breakfast and dinner as well as fine gastronomic cuisine.

Le Ponant was entirely refitted and refurbished in 2022. Having been totally renovated with a design by the Jean-Philippe Nuel Studio, the result was 16 staterooms for a maximum of 32 guests. Le Ponant, which will navigate under sail as often as possible, includes other improvements such as a dockside connection, an innovative system of SCR filters to eliminate fine particles and reduce nitrogen oxide emissions by 90%, waste sorting and a state-of-the-art water treatment system – all to help protect the environment.

== History ==
=== 2008 Somali pirate attack ===
On 4 April 2008, Le Ponant was seized by Somali pirates in the Gulf of Aden while en route from the Seychelles to the Mediterranean. The ship carried no passengers at the time of its capture, but all 30 crewmembers were taken hostage; 22 French, 6 Filipino, 1 Cameroonian and 1 Ukrainian. French forces, including the aviso Commandant Bouan, and a Canadian CH-124 helicopter from HMCS Charlottetown were monitoring the yacht after its seizure. The hostages were released without incident on 12 April.

Following the release, French helicopters from the Djibouti military base tracked the pirates to the village of Jariban. French commando marine and GIGN operating from the frigate Jean Bart and the cruiser Jeanne d'Arc moved in when the pirates attempted to flee in the desert. A sniper disabled the get-away vehicle, and the commandos were able to capture six men. Local officials claimed that three people died in the raid, with a further eight wounded, but France denied this. Troops also recovered some of the ransom money paid by the owner of the yacht for the release of its crew. The six captured pirates were flown to Paris, where they faced trial in 2012. Four of the six men were convicted and sentenced to four to ten years in prison.

=== SolidSail prototype testing ===
Between October 2018 and 2019, Le Ponant served as the testing platform for Chantiers de l'Atlantique's SolidSail rigid sail technology. On 25 October 2018, during a technical stop in Marseille, the vessel's forward mast was equipped with a half-scale SolidSail prototype measuring over 300 m^{2} (3,200 sq ft). The rigid sail, constructed from composite panels of fibreglass, carbon, and epoxy resin framed by carbon slats, was tested during transatlantic crossings to Cape Verde and Cuba under various operational conditions. According to Ponant CEO Jean-Emmanuel Sauvée, the company was immediately interested in collaborating with Chantiers de l'Atlantique, viewing sail propulsion as "without a doubt an energy of the future" and the trials as essential to validating the technology's potential for significant environmental and economic benefits. The prototype was removed during the vessel's major refurbishment between November 2019 and April 2020 at San Giorgio del Porto shipyard in Genoa, Italy, with the yacht returning to service in 2022 with traditional canvas sails and enhanced environmental features including a selective catalytic reduction filter reducing nitrogen oxide emissions by up to 90%.
