= Le Soléal =

French cruise ship built in 2013

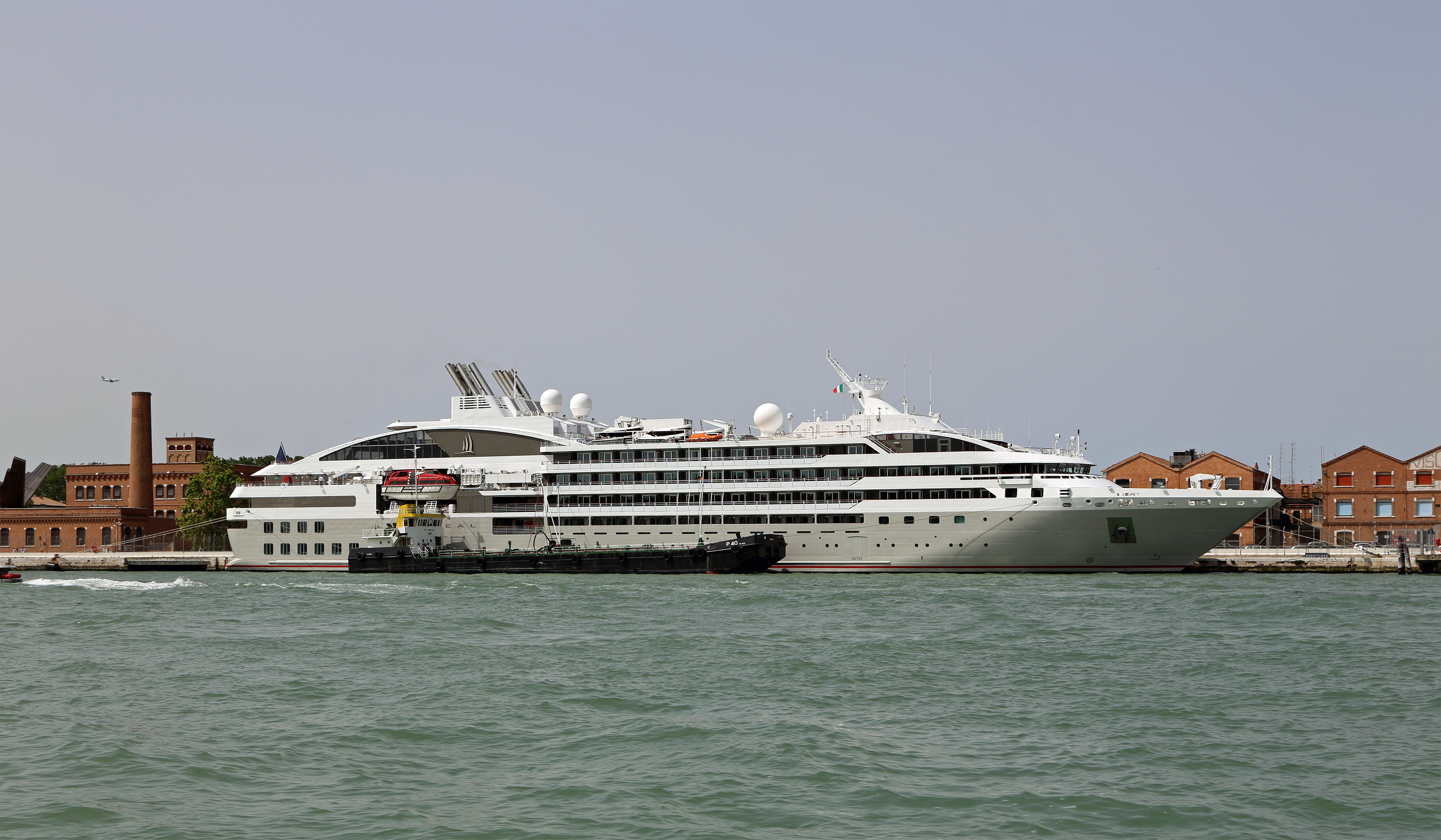
- Le Soléal moored in Venice in 2014

History

Wallis and Futuna
- Name: Le Soléal
- Operator: Ponant
- Port of registry: (Wallis and Futuna) Mata Utu
- Ordered: 2011
- Builder: Fincantieri
- Laid down: 2012
- Launched: 6 December 2012
- Completed: 21 June 2013
- Maiden voyage: 1 July 2013
- Identification: Call sign: FIHV; MMSI number: 578000200; IMO number: 9641675
- Status: In service

General characteristics
- Class & type: Le Boreal-class cruise ships
- Tonnage: 10,992 GT
- Length: 142.1 m (466 ft)
- Beam: 18.0 m (59 ft)
- Draught: 4.9 m (16 ft)
- Decks: 7
- Propulsion: 2 propeller shafts: 2 propellers
- Capacity: 264 passengers
- Crew: 139 crewmembers

Le Soléal is a Le Boreal-class cruise ship operated by Compagnie du Ponant.

== History ==
The ship was built at the Fincantieri shipyard in Ancona, Italy, and was launched on the 6 December 2012, being christened by Kiki Tauck Mahar. The vessel started its maiden voyage on 1 July 2013.

Le Soléal became the first French commercial shipping vessel to traverse the Northwest Passage. The vessel left Kangerlussuaq in Greenland on August 26, 2013, and arrived in Anadyr, in Russia on September 16, 2013.

Le Soléal featured in the TV show Mighty Cruise Ships during her voyage around Indonesia.
