= Barbara Budd =

Canadian actress, narrator and radio announcer

- Born: May 23, 1951 (age 74); St. Catharines, Ontario, Canada
- Occupations: Actress; narrator; radio announcer
- Years active: 1977-present

Barbara Budd (born May 23, 1951) is a Canadian actress, narrator and radio announcer. Between 1993 and April 30, 2010, she was the co-host of CBC Radio One's As It Happens.

== Early life ==
Budd was born in St. Catharines, Ontario. She studied theatre performance at York University and graduated with a Bachelor of Fine Arts degree in 1974.

== Career ==
Budd worked for five seasons as a company member at Canada's Stratford Festival under Robin Phillips (1975–1980), most notably playing Cathleen in a 1977 production of Long Day's Journey into Night and Emilia in a 1979 production of Othello.

She continued to act for other theatre companies, and had minor film roles, in the 1980s before joining CBC Radio, for whom she worked as a continuity announcer and substitute host, as well as an occasional guest performer on Royal Canadian Air Farce. Three of her guest appearances with Air Farce appear on the troupe's 1990 album To Air Is Human, To Farce Divine. In one of her most famous sketches with Air Farce, a businessman befuddled by the complexities of the new GST calls the government's information line; Budd plays the customer service representative, who answers his tax questions in the steamy and seductive tone of a phone sex operator.

She joined As It Happens, succeeding Alan Maitland, in 1993.

She had done voice work on animations including shows such as RoboCop: The Animated Series, Dinosaucers, Miss Spider's Sunny Patch Friends, Stunt Dawgs, Babar, The New Archies, Rupert, Little Shop, Blazing Dragons, Stickin' Around, The Adventures of Tintin, Ultraforce, Pippi Longstocking, Bob and Margaret, and Little Rosey, and provided the voice of "Skyress" on Bakugan Battle Brawlers.

She continues to narrate documentary films, recordings, and classical music concerts.

On the March 29, 2010 episode of As It Happens she announced that she would be leaving the show on April 30 as CBC had elected not to renew her contract, and asked listeners to send her a photo so she could "put a face to the ears". She subsequently revealed that she was never a permanent employee of CBC Radio, but spent her entire tenure with the network as a freelance contractor.

Since departing CBC Radio, Budd has returned to Stratford, Ontario, where in addition to her ongoing work as host, moderating panel discussions and appearing as a guest speaker, she is writing a book.

== Awards ==
In 2009, Budd received the Bryden Award by York University as an alumnus who has attained extraordinary achievements and made remarkable contributions to York. Budd received ACTRA's John Drainie Award in 2011 for her distinguished contribution to Canadian broadcasting.
