= Paul Gauguin (ship) =

Cruise ship built in 1997

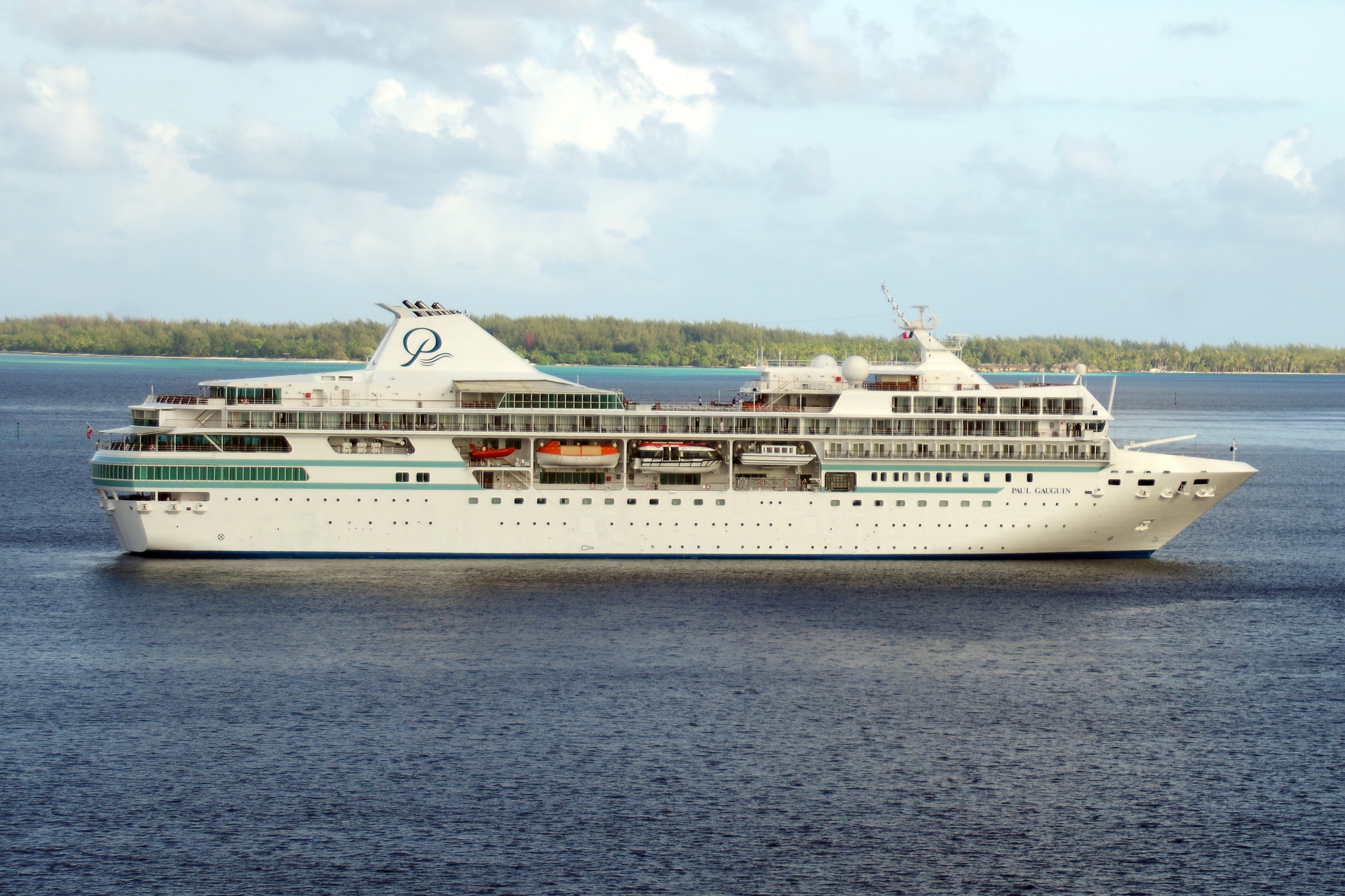
- Paul Gauguin at Bora Bora

History

The Bahamas
- Name: m/s Paul Gauguin
- Owner: Paul Gauguin Shipping Limited
- Operator: Ponant Cruises
- Port of registry: France
- Builder: Chantiers de l'Atlantique
- Launched: 25 April 1997
- Completed: 1997
- Identification: IMO number: 9111319; MMSI number: 311652000; Callsign: C6TH9
- Status: In service

General characteristics
- Tonnage: 19,200 GT
- Length: 504 ft (154 m)
- Beam: 71 ft (22 m)
- Draft: 16.9 ft (5.2 m)
- Decks: 7 passenger decks
- Speed: 18 knots (33 km/h; 21 mph)
- Capacity: 330
- Crew: 215

MS Paul Gauguin is a cruise ship that was completed in 1997. It primarily operates in the South Pacific. Paul Gauguin Cruises is part of PONANT EXPLORATIONS GROUP headquartered in Marseille, France.

== Description ==
Paul Gauguin is 504 feet (154 m) long with a beam of 72 feet (22 m) and a draft of 17.1 feet (5.2 m). The cruise ship has a gross tonnage (GT) 19,200 and is powered by a diesel-electric system giving the vessel a maximum speed of 18 knots (33 km/h; 21 mph). The ship has seven passenger decks and capacity for 318 guests. Paul Gauguin has a crew of 216. In 2019, it was announced that the vessel would be renovated to use low-sulphur marine gas oil instead of heavy marine fuel.

== Career ==
The vessel was constructed by Chantiers de l'Atlantique in St. Nazaire, France. The cruise ship was launched on 25 April 1997 and completed and delivered on 1 December 1997 to Services et Transports Tahiti of Mata-Utu, French Polynesia. The ship was christened at Port Everglades, Florida on 18 December and sailed for the Pacific the following day.

Originally registered in France, the ship's registry was changed to the Bahamas until July 2020, when new owner Ponant re-registered the ship in Wallis & Futuna thus returning the ship to sail under the flag of France.

=== Coronavirus pandemic ===
During the COVID-19 pandemic, the ship did not sail for some time but resumed operations on 18 July 2020 for local residents and on 29 July for international guests, with reduced occupancy. A news report on 3 August 2020 stated that COVID-19 virus had been detected on the ship while it was in Papeete, Tahiti; passengers were required to stay in their cabins. As of that date, the ship was operated by the Ponant Company under the branding Paul Gauguin Cruises, The capacity was stated to be 318 guests plus a crew of 216. The ship had been modified to use a "cleaner" fuel — low-sulphur marine gas oil (LS-MGO) — and the company planned "to offset 150 percent of its carbon emissions". The company's web site discussed renovations that had been completed. On 1 August 2020, Polynésie la 1ère reported that a case of SARS-CoV-2 had been found aboard Paul Gauguin. The passengers were told about the case that same day, and the ship immediately turned around, skipping its next port of call in Rangiroa, and headed back toward Papeete. All the passengers were requested to stay in their cabins while food was brought to them.

The ship had left Tahiti on 30 July, and had made a stopover in Bora Bora before Compagnie du Ponant was aware of the presence of an asymptomatic case of the virus in a 22-year-old female passenger. (Note: The Guardian reported that the case was found in a crew member, but many other sources reported that it was found in a female passenger. Seatrade Cruise News reported that the passenger was tested aboard the ship, following the rule that tourists must be tested within four days after arrival in French Polynesia.) During the stopover, both the passengers and the crew had been able to disembark and interact with the locals of Bora Bora for two days.

Once Paul Gauguin arrived back in Papeete on the morning of 2 August, all 148 passengers and 192 crew members were placed in confinement.
