= Compagnie du Ponant =

French cruise ship operator

Ponant
- Type: Private
- Industry: Maritime transport
- Founded: 1 April 1988; 38 years ago
- Headquarters: Marseille, France
- Products: Cruise line
- Owner: Groupe Artémis
- Website: en.ponant.com

Ponant (French: [pɔnɑ̃]), officially the Compagnie du Ponant (CDP), is a French cruise ship operator. It was founded in 1988 by Philippe Videau, Jean-Emmanuel Sauvé, and other officers of the French Merchant Navy and launched the first French cruise ship. The company operates eleven ships, all of which operate under the French flag.

== History ==
Ponant started out with one ship, Le Ponant, a three masted Barque built in 1991. Le Ponant still operates with the company today. Eight years later in 1999, the company acquired Le Levant, a yacht. After 13 years in service with Ponant, Le Levant was purchased by Paul Gauguin Cruises in 2012 and became Tere Moana. In 2004, Ponant purchased Le Diamant, a luxury liner. Le Diamant transferred to Quark Expeditions in 2012 to become Ocean Diamond.

Later, in 2010, Ponant put into service the first of a series of four identical luxury sister ships, Le Boreal. A year later, the company began operating the second ship of the class, L'Austral and in 2013 the third ship of the class was added to the fleet, Le Soléal. The fourth ship of the class, Le Lyrial, was delivered in 2015.

Initially based in Nantes for 18 years, in 2006 the company headquarters was moved to Marseille following its acquisition by CMA CGM. In 2012, CMA CGM sold Ponant to Bridgepoint Capital.

On April 4, 2008, Le Ponant was seized by Somali pirates in the Gulf of Aden while en route from the Seychelles to the Mediterranean. The ship carried no passengers at the time of its capture, but all 30 crewmembers were taken hostage. The hostages were released without incident on April 12. Following the release, French helicopters tracked the pirates to the village of Jariban. French commando marine and GIGN operating from the frigate Jean Bart and the Jeanne d'Arc moved in when the pirates attempted to flee in the desert. A sniper disabled the get-away vehicle, and the commandos were able to capture six men. Local officials claimed that three people died in the raid, with a further eight wounded, but France denied this. Troops also recovered some of the ransom money paid by the owner of the yacht for the release of its crew. The six captured pirates have since been flown to Paris, where they were to face trial.

In 2012, the owner of Compagnie du Ponant, CMA CGM, sold the company to Bridgepoint Capital.

In 2013, one of Ponant's ships, Le Soleal, became the first French commercial shipping vessel to traverse the Northwest Passage. The vessel left Kangerlussuaq in Greenland on August 26, 2013, and arrived in Anadyr, in Russia on September 16, 2013.

In 2015, Groupe Artémis bought Compagnie du Ponant from Bridgepoint.

In March 2016, Ponant ordered four new ships with about 10,000 GT at Vard, a subcompany of Fincantieri. They were delivered in 2018 and 2019. The ships are named Le Lapérouse, Le Champlain, Le Bougainville and Le Dumont-d'Urville.

In December 2017, Le Lapérouse left Vard Tulcea in Romania and was heading to final outfitting at Vard facility in Norway. She arrived in mid of January.

In December 2017, Ponant announced that it had ordered an icebreaking expedition cruise ship from Vard. The 2.7 billion kr (about €274 million) vessel will be built to the second-highest IACS ice class, Polar Class 2, and will be capable of taking tourists to the North Pole. The vessel, named Le Commandant Charcot, was delivered in 2021.

In March 2018, Ponant announced the order of two additional 180-passenger expedition ships, Le Bellot and Le Jaques Cartier; they joined the company in 2020.

In 2019 Ponant purchased Paul Gauguin Cruises owners of the Paul Gauguin.

In 2020 Ponant came under criticism for refusing to provide refunds to passengers from cancelled cruises due to COVID-19. During the pandemic, the ship did not sail for some time but resumed operations on 18 July 2020 for local residents and on 29 July for international guests, with reduced occupancy.

A news report on 3 August 2020 stated that the COVID-19 virus had been detected on the MS Paul Gauguin while it was in Papeete, Tahiti; passengers were required to stay in their cabins. At that time, after renovations, the capacity was stated to be 318 guests plus a crew of 216. The ship had been modified to use a "cleaner" fuel: LS MGO – Low-Sulphur Marine Gas Oil and the company planned "to offset 150 percent of its carbon emissions".

In spring 2020, Le Commandant Charcot was being built by Vard, Fincantieri shipbuilding subsidiary in Norway. This high polar exploration ship is equipped with a hybrid propulsion system which uses both electricity and liquefied natural gas (LNG). Delivered in August 2021 Le Commandant Charcot has a similar design to the PONANT Explorer series, though she is larger and more powerful. Due to the manoeuvrability of the Azipod systems, she can operate both in ahead direction and sternfirst, depending on the prevailing ice conditions. Le Commandant Charcot is also the first ship to feature a Polar Class 2 icebreaking hull.

On March 29, 2021, following the announcement of François-Henri Pinault, Managing Partner of Artémis, Hervé Gastinel took over after Jean-Emmanuel Sauvée as the company's CEO.

== Current fleet ==
Ship	Built	Entered service for Ponant	Gross tonnage	Flag	Notes	Ship image
Le Ponant	1991	1991	1,489 GT	France	A barque built in 1991, 32 cabins for 64 passengers and 32 crew members.	
Boreal class
Le Boréal	2010	2010	10,700 GT	WLF	Built in 2010, 132 cabins and suites for 264 passengers and 140 crew members.	
L'Austral	2011	2011	10,944 GT	WLF	Sister vessel of Le Boréal, built in 2011, 132 cabins and suites for 264 passengers and 140 crew members. L'Austral was put into service on April 20, 2011.	
Le Soléal	2012	2012	10,944 GT	WLF	Sister vessel of Le Boréal and L'Austral. Like her sisters, she has 132 cabins and suites for 264 passengers and 140 crew members.	
Le Lyrial	2015	2015	10,944 GT	WLF	On 16 July 2013, Fincantieri and Ponant announced that they had signed a contract for a new super luxury cruise ship, to be delivered in 2015. Le Lyrial is a sister ship of Le Soléal and, like her sister, was built in Fincantieri's Ancona shipyard.	
Ponant Explorers class
Le Lapérouse	2018	2018	9,900 GT	WLF	Lead ship in the Ponant Explorers class. Built at VARD in Ålesund, Norway and in Tulcea in Romania.	
Le Champlain	2018	2018	9,900 GT	WLF	Second ship in the Ponant Explorers class. Also built at VARD in Ålesund, Norway and in Tulcea in Romania.	
Le Bougainville	2019	2019	9,900 GT	WLF	Third ship in the Ponant Explorers class. Also built at VARD in Ålesund, Norway and in Tulcea in Romania.	
Le Dumont-d'Urville	2019	2019	9,900 GT	WLF	Fourth ship in the Ponant Explorers class. Also built at VARD in Ålesund, Norway and in Tulcea in Romania.	
Le Bellot	2020	2020	9,900 GT	WLF	Fifth ship in the Ponant Explorers class. Also built at VARD in Ålesund, Norway and in Tulcea in Romania.	
Le Jacques Cartier	2020	2020	9,900 GT	WLF	Sixth ship in the Ponant Explorers class. Also built at VARD in Ålesund, Norway and in Tulcea in Romania.	
Polar exploration vessel
Le Commandant Charcot	2021	2021	30,000 GT	WLF	First hybrid-electric polar exploration ship powered by liquefied natural gas. Also built at VARD in Søviknes, Norway and in Tulcea in Romania.	
Paul Gauguin Cruises
Paul Gauguin	1997	2019	19,200 tons	WLF	Paul Gauguin Cruises was purchased by Ponant in 2019	

== Former fleet ==
Ship	Built	In service for Ponant	Gross tonnage	Flag	Notes	Ship image
Le Levant	1998	1998-2012	3,500 GT	France	A yacht built in 1998, 45 cabins for 90 passengers and 55 crew members. Sold to Paul Gauguin Cruises to become Tere Moana. Delivered in 2012.	In previous livery as Le Levant
Le Diamant	1974, rebuilt in 1986	2004-2011	8,282 GRT	France	A luxury liner bought in 2004, 113 cabins for 226 passengers and 120 crew. Transferred to Quark expeditions in 2013.	In previous livery as Le Diamant

== In popular culture ==
In 2025, Ponant supported the filming of the Icelandic documentary North Pole '85, directed by Orly Orlyson and Rafnar Orri. The film retraces the 1985 expedition to the North Pole by Neil Armstrong and Edmund Hillary. Ponant provided cabins aboard the icebreaking cruise ship Le Commandant Charcot for members of the Armstrong and Hillary families, as well as the film crew.
