= List of shipwrecks in 2015 =

The list of shipwrecks in 2015 includes ships sunk, foundered, grounded, or otherwise lost during 2015.

table of contents
2015
Jan	Feb	Mar	Apr
May	Jun	Jul	Aug
Sep	Oct	Nov	Dec

== January ==
=== 1 January ===
List of shipwrecks: 1 January 2015
Ship	State	Description
Sea Merchant	Tanzania	The cargo ship carrying 20,000 sacks of cement sank off Lobo, Batangas, Philippines, after encountering rough seas and strong winds. Of her crew, one was killed and nineteen survived.
Unnamed vessel	Iran	The fishing vessel capsized off the coast of Puntland, Somalia during Cyclone Chapala.

=== 2 January ===
List of shipwrecks: 2 January 2015
Ship	State	Description
Better Trans	Panama	The cargo ship sprang a leak and foundered in the Philippine Sea (19°25′N 127°40′E) with the loss of one of her nineteen crew.
Bulk Jupiter	Bahamas	The bulk carrier capsized and sank off Vũng Tàu, Vietnam, with one survivor and the loss of at least two lives of her nineteen crew.
Cemfjord	Cyprus	The cargo ship capsized in the North Sea off the coast of Caithness, United Kingdom. The upturned vessel was discovered on 3 January by Hrossey (United Kingdom).
Helene Rickmers	Marshall Islands	The container ship ran aground in the Solomon Sea (10°22′S 150°59′E). She was on a voyage from Port Moresby to Alotau, Papua New Guinea.

=== 3 January ===
List of shipwrecks: 3 January 2015
Ship	State	Description
Höegh Osaka	Singapore	Höegh Osaka The car transporter developed a severe list and was beached on the Bramble Bank, in The Solent. All twenty-five people on board were rescued by helicopter and lifeboat.

=== 4 January ===
List of shipwrecks: 4 January 2015
Ship	State	Description
Run Guang 9	China	The tanker caught fire and exploded off Zhanjiang. Twelve of her fourteen crew were rescued. Two were missing as of 4 January.

=== 5 January ===
List of shipwrecks: 5 January 2015
Ship	State	Description
Magellan Spirit	Denmark	The LNG tanker ran aground 5 nautical miles (9.3 km) off Bonny Island, Nigeria. She was on a voyage from Bonny, Nigeria, to Gwangyang, South Korea. Her cargo was transferred to Excellence (Belgium) in an operation that began on 21 January. She was refloated the next day.

=== 7 January ===
List of shipwrecks: xx January 2015
Ship	State	Description
Gulf Rio	Saint Kitts and Nevis	The cargo ship ran aground in the Black Sea near Samsun, Turkey and began taking on water. Her ten crew were rescued by a Turkish Coast Guard helicopter.

=== 8 January ===
List of shipwrecks: 8 January 2015
Ship	State	Description
Pura Vida Princess	Costa Rica	The catamaran capsized and sank off midway to Isla Tortuga, with the loss of three of the 109 people on board.
Vicente	Cape Verde	The ro-ro ferry foundered off Fogo. Eleven of the twenty-six people on board were rescued and three bodies were recovered.

=== 9 January ===
List of shipwrecks: 9 January 2015
Ship	State	Description
LCT 378	Mongolia	The cargo ship foundered off Camiguin, Philippines. Her twenty-six crew were rescued by Tong Ying (China).
Østbanken	Norway	The fishing vessel foundered 60 nautical miles (110 km) north of Båtsfjord. Her five crew were rescued by a helicopter.

=== 13 January ===
List of shipwrecks: 13 January 2015
Ship	State	Description
Citeca	Russia	The ro-ro ship caught fire at Akita, Japan. Her fourteen crew abandoned ship. The fire was extinguished on 22 January.
Mare	Vanuatu	The cargo ship was abandoned in Chanai Bay, Crete, Greece. Her five crew were rescued by helicopter.
Sea Bird	Togo	The cargo ship was driven ashore at Antalya, Turkey. Her fourteen crew were rescued by the Turkish Coast Guard.

=== 14 January ===
List of shipwrecks: 14 January 2015
Ship	State	Description
Retaj	Togo	The cargo ship caught fire off Iskenderun, Turkey. Her twenty-three crew were rescued.

=== 16 January ===
List of shipwrecks: 16 January 2015
Ship	State	Description
JMS Delta	China	The tug capsized and sank in the Yangtze at Taizhou City with the loss of twenty-two of the twenty-five people on board.

=== 18 January ===
List of shipwrecks: 18 January 2015
Ship	State	Description
Leif Roald	Norway	The fishing vessel capsized and sank after striking a reef off Averøya, Norway. Her nine crew were rescued by a Norwegian Society for Sea Rescue vessel and another boat.

=== 20 January ===
List of shipwrecks: 20 January 2015
Ship	State	Description
Xuan Lam 10	Vietnam	The cargo ship foundered in the South China Sea 2 nautical miles (3.7 km) off the coast of Quang Ngai Province. Her ten crew were rescued.

=== 22 January ===
List of shipwrecks: 22 January 2015
Ship	State	Description
Nalani	United States	The towing vessel foundered in the Pacific Ocean 7 nautical miles (13 km) off Oahu, Hawaii. Her eleven crew were rescued by USCGC Kittiwake (U.S. Coast Guard) and Tiger 7 ( National Oceanic and Atmospheric Administration).
USNS Sgt. Matej Kocak	United States Naval Service	The Sgt. Matej Kocak-class cargo ship ran aground 6 nautical miles (11 km) off Uruma, Japan.

=== 28 January ===
List of shipwrecks: 28 January 2015
Ship	State	Description
Floreana	Ecuador	The ship ran aground off the Galapagos Islands and partially sank. Ecuadorean authorities have decided that the ship will be scuttled once her cargo has been offloaded.

=== 31 January ===
List of shipwrecks: 31 January 2015
Ship	State	Description
Gunesli	Turkey	The ro-ro ferry was driven ashore at Tatlısu.

== February ==
=== 2 February ===
List of shipwrecks: 2 February 2015
Ship	State	Description
Ak Ceren	Panama	The cargo ship was driven from her mooring and ran aground at Altınova, Turkey.
Bodyer	Turkey	The cargo ship was driven ashore at Aliağa. There was no-one on board at the time.
Gofer B	Panama	The cargo ship was driven ashore at Aliağa. Her crew were rescued.
Gulfem Kalkavan	Turkey	The cargo ship was driven ashore and sank at Tuzla.
Melek B	Panama	The cargo ship was driven ashore at Aliağa. Her crew were rescued.
Pasha	Tanzania	The cargo ship was driven ashore and capsized at Balıkesir.

=== 3 February ===
List of shipwrecks: 3 February 2015
Ship	State	Description
Biru Perkasa 1	Cambodia	The cargo ship was driven aground at Pangandaran, Indonesia. Her crew were rescued.

=== 5 February ===
List of shipwrecks: 5 February 2015
Ship	State	Description
Skorpios II	Chile	The cruise ship ran aground 7.6 nautical miles (14 km) south west of Puerto Montt. All 120 passengers and crew were taken off by the Chilean Navy. Skorpios II was refloated the next day and taken to Puerto Montt.

=== 6 February ===
List of shipwrecks: xx February 2015
Ship	State	Description
Dewi Rezky	Indonesia	The coaster sank off Agats. Her crew were rescued.

=== 9 February ===
List of shipwrecks: 9 February 2015
Ship	State	Description
Tourist Ferry Boat Primo	Italy	The ferry was driven ashore on Ischia. She was refloated on 13 February.

=== 11 February ===
List of shipwrecks: 11 February 2015
Ship	State	Description
Goodfaith	Cyprus	The bulk carrier was driven ashore on Andros, Greece. Her 22 crew were rescued by the Greek Coast Guard and local fire brigade. She was on a voyage from Eleusis, Greece to Odesa, Ukraine.

=== 17 February ===
List of shipwrecks: 17 February 2015
Ship	State	Description
Fort Azov	Saint Kitts and Nevis	The cargo ship foundered in the Black Sea 1 nautical mile (1.9 km) off Ayancik, Turkey. Her twelve crew were rescued by Turkish Coast Guard helicopters.

=== 18 February ===
List of shipwrecks: 18 February 2015
Ship	State	Description
Kristina	Germany	The 17.31-metre (56 ft 9 in) fishing vessel sprung a leak in the North Sea and sank (54°24′N 06°10′E). Her crew was rescued by Reimerswaal (Netherlands).
Lysblink Seaways	United Kingdom	The cargo ship ran aground near Ardnamurchan Point, Scotland. Her crew remained on board and she was refloated on 20 February. She was on a voyage from Belfast, Northern Ireland, to Skogn, Norway. She was consequently declared a constructive total loss and scrapped.

=== 20 February ===
List of shipwrecks: 20 February 2015
Ship	State	Description
Kerem S	Saint Vincent and the Grenadines	The ship was driven ashore on the coast of Levitha, Greece. Her six crew were rescued by a Greek Coast Guard helicopter. She floated off on 26 February and foundered.

=== 22 February ===
List of shipwrecks: 22 February 2015
Ship	State	Description
M. L. Mosta	Bangladesh	The passenger ferry was in collision with a cargo ship in the Padma River. She capsized and sank with the loss of 48 lives.

== March ==
=== 4 March ===
List of shipwrecks: 4 March 2015
Ship	State	Description
Eastern Amber	Hong Kong	The cargo ship collided with another vessel in the Yellow Sea off Gunsan, South Korea and was severely damaged. Her eighteen crew were taken off by helicopter. The ship was beached; it was later taken under tow by the tug Koyo Maru (Japan) but capsized and sank in the Korea Strait 22 nautical miles (40 km) off Jeju Island, South Korea on 12 March.

=== 6 March ===
List of shipwrecks: 6 March 2015
Ship	State	Description
Krka	Croatia	The cement carrier was driven ashore at Split.
Orebić	Croatia	The cement carrier was driven ashore at Split.
Vranjic	Croatia	The cement carrier was driven ashore at Slatine. She was still ashore on 4 August.

=== 9 March ===
List of shipwrecks: 9 March 2015
Ship	State	Description
Golden 168	Panama	The cargo ship caught fire at Vung Tau, Vietnam. Her twenty crew were evacuated.
Mercurio Del Golfo	Panama	The tug sank in the Atlantic Ocean 80 nautical miles (150 km) off Rio de Janeiro, Brazil. One of her seven crew was reported missing.

=== 11 March ===
List of shipwrecks: 11 March 2015
Ship	State	Description
CSE Clipper Express	Panama	The bulk carrier was driven aground on the coast of Honshū, Japan. She was refloated on 17 March.
Eastern Amber	Hong Kong	The cargo ship capsized off Jeju Island, South Korea whilst under tow by Koyo Maru (Japan). No crew were aboard.
Tong Yang Hai	Cambodia	The cargo ship foundered in the Sea of Japan 150 nautical miles (280 km) off the coast of Honshū. Her fourteen crew were rescued by the Japanese Coast Guard.

=== 12 March ===
List of shipwrecks: 13 March 2015
Ship	State	Description
Blue Gold	Vanuatu	Cyclone Pam: The motor yacht was driven ashore on Vanuatu.

=== 13 March ===
List of shipwrecks: 13 March 2015
Ship	State	Description
Aung Tagun 3	Burma	A ferry sank off the coast of Myanmar, killing about 50 people. The accident was attributed to poor weather conditions. According to reports, there were more than 200 passengers on board the Aung Takon ferry, which was sailing from Kyaukphyu to Sittwe in Myanmar's Rakhine State when it sank.

=== 14 March ===
List of shipwrecks: 14 March 2015
Ship	State	Description
Sea Bear	United States	The tug sank off Fire Island, New York with the loss of one of her four crew.
Sun Wing	Panama	The tanker caught fire in the Sea of Japan off Busan, South Korea and was abandoned by her eighteen crew.

=== 23 March ===
List of shipwrecks: 23 March 2015
Ship	State	Description
Binh Duong 668	Vietnam	The cargo ship ran aground off the Hom Gom Peninsula whilst avoiding a collision with a fishing vessel. Her nine crew were rescued.
High Speed 5	Greece	The ferry was severely damaged by fire at Piraeus with the loss of one life.

=== 24 March ===
List of shipwrecks: 24 March 2015
Ship	State	Description
Kumala Endah	Indonesia	The cargo ship struck a submerged object and sank in the Strait of Malacca 10 nautical miles (19 km) off Belawan. Two of her fourteen crew were killed and five were rescued. As of 27 March, nine are missing, presumed dead.

=== 27 March ===
List of shipwrecks: xx March 2015
Ship	State	Description
Meiyu No.18	Japan	The tug capsized and sank in the Tsugaru Strait with the loss of two of her four crew. One person was reported missing.

=== 30 March ===
List of shipwrecks: 30 March 2015
Ship	State	Description
Asterix	United Kingdom	The tug capsized in Southampton Water. Both crew were rescued.
Liana's Ransom	Canada	Liana's Ransom The topsail schooner was abandoned off the coast of Massachusetts, United States. Her crew were rescued by USCGC Ocracoke (United States Navy). Liana's Ransom was on a voyage from the Meteghan River, Nova Scotia to Sint Maarten.
Zhenhe 168	China	The cargo ship foundered in the South China Sea off Xiquan Island with the loss of her thirteen crew.

== April ==
=== 1 April ===
List of shipwrecks: 1 April 2015
Ship	State	Description
Dalniy Vostok	Russia	The fishing vessel foundered in the Sea of Okhotsk off the Kamchatka Peninsula with the loss of 57 of the 132 people on board. Twelve people were reported to be missing.

=== 3 April ===
List of shipwrecks: 3 April 2015
Ship	State	Description
MPB Wilayza	Philippines	The ship foundered off the coast of Sulu Province. Fifty passengers were being carried illegally on board the overloaded vessel. Five were confirmed to have died and fourteen were rescued. The remainder were listed as missing.

=== 4 April ===
List of shipwrecks: 4 April 2015
Ship	State	Description
HMCS Annapolis	Royal Canadian Navy	The decommissioned Annapolis-class destroyer was scuttled as an artificial reef and long-term marine habitat in Halkett Bay Provincial Park off Gambier Island in Howe Sound on the coast of British Columbia, Canada. The wreck sits upright at a depth of 32 metres (105 ft), with the top of the ship reaching a depth of 10.5 metres (34 ft).

=== 5 April ===
List of shipwrecks: 5 April 2015
Ship	State	Description
Yang En 1	China	The bulk carrier collided with Maria G.O. (Marshall Islands) and sank in the East China Sea off Weihai, Shandong Province.

=== 6 April ===
List of shipwrecks: 6 April 2015
Ship	State	Description
Thunder	Russia	The fishing vessel sank in the Atlantic Ocean 115 nautical miles (213 km) west of São Tomé. Her forty crew were rescued by Bob Barker (Netherlands) and Sam Simon (Netherlands). Thunder was suspected to have been fishing illegally for toothfish.

=== 8 April ===
List of shipwrecks: 8 April 2015
Ship	State	Description
Marathassa	Cyprus	The cargo ship ran aground in English Bay.

=== 9 April ===
List of shipwrecks: 9 April 2015
Ship	State	Description
Ao Nang Princess 5	Thailand	The passenger ferry suffered an onboard explosion, caught fire and sank off Ao Nang. One of the 116 passengers was reported to be missing after they abandoned ship, with a second reported to have died.

=== 11 April ===
List of shipwrecks: 11 April 2015
Ship	State	Description
Oleg Naydenov	Russia	The factory ship caught fire at Las Palmas, Canary Islands, Spain. The burning ship was towed 20 nautical miles (37 km) offshore after her 72 crew were evacuated. She sank on 14 April.

=== 15 April ===
List of shipwrecks: 15 April 2015
Ship	State	Description
Hai Jian 77	China	The bulk carrier capsized off Xiao Qu Shan Island. Four of her nine crew were rescued, five were reported missing.

=== 16 April ===
List of shipwrecks: 15 April 2015
Ship	State	Description
Dominator	Togo	The cargo ship sprang a leak and was abandoned off Datça, Turkey. Her 21 crew were rescued by fishing vessels and the Turkish Coast Guard.

=== 18 April ===
List of shipwrecks: 18 April 2015
Ship	State	Description
Unnamed migrant ship		The 20-metre (66 ft) vessel capsized to the south of the Italian island of Lampedusa, with seven hundred feared dead after it collided with King Jacob (Portugal) and sank within five minutes. Twenty-eight people survived.

=== 19 April ===
List of shipwrecks: 19 April 2015
Ship	State	Description
Gökçeada 1	Turkey	The passenger ferry ran aground at Gökçeada, Turkey. All 188 passengers were taken off by lifeboat.

=== 21 April ===
List of shipwrecks: 21 April 2015
Ship	State	Description
Unnamed barge	Egypt	The barge was carrying 500 tons of phosphate. The ship capsized after colliding with the foundations of the city's Dandara Bridge, in Upper Egypt's Qena. No casualties were reported. The ship was probably a property of the Egyptian Armed Forces.

=== 24 April ===
List of shipwrecks: xx April 2015
Ship	State	Description
LCT Batiwakkal Permai Berau	Indonesia	The landing craft tank was driven ashore at Merak, Banten.
Soechi Chemical	Indonesia	The chemical tanker was driven ashore at Merak.

=== 26 April ===
List of shipwrecks: 26 April 2015
Ship	State	Description
Mutiara Persada I	Indonesia	The ferry ran aground off Bakauheni. Her passengers were evacuated. She was on a voyage from Bakauheni to Merak, Banten.

=== 28 April ===
List of shipwrecks: 28 April 2015
Ship	State	Description
Sorrento	Italy	The ro-pax ferry caught fire 15 nautical miles (27 km) off Mallorca, Spain. All 156 passengers and crew were evacuated by Puglia, Visemar One (both Italy) and Marta Mata (Spain).

=== 29 April ===
List of shipwrecks: 29 April 2015
Ship	State	Description
JS Danube	Singapore	The bulk carrier ran aground 2 nautical miles (3.7 km) off Mombasa, Kenya. Her 25 crew were rescued.

== May ==
=== 7 May ===
List of shipwrecks: 7 May 2015
Ship	State	Description
Ming Yang Zhou 179	China	The cargo ship collided with Hui Dong Fang 332 (China) and sank off Guangzhou. Seven crew were rescued.

=== 8 May ===
List of shipwrecks: 8 May 2015
Ship	State	Description
LCT Daniel 8019	Indonesia	The landing craft tank capsized at Somber, Balikpapan, with the loss of one of her seven crew.

=== 10 May ===
List of shipwrecks: 10 May 2015
Ship	State	Description
Bo Sung No.2010	South Korea	The fish carrier ran aground off Yeosu and developed a severe list.

=== 20 May ===
List of shipwrecks: 20 May 2015
Ship	State	Description
Martha Petrol	Indonesia	The tanker ran aground at Cilacap. She was refloated on 1 July.
Oceanline SC208	China	The dredger capsized off Tanjung Penngai, Malaysia. One of her fifteen crew was rescued.

=== 21 May ===
List of shipwrecks: 21 May 2015
Ship	State	Description
Yue You Lian 68	China	The cargo ship foundered off Gaolan. Her nine crew were rescued by the tug Zhugangtuo 8 (China). Yue You Lian 68 was on a voyage from Hong Kong to Taishan.

=== 25 May ===
List of shipwrecks: 25 May 2015
Ship	State	Description
Da You 78	China	The tanker collided with another vessel off Guangzhou and caught fire. She was declared a total loss.
Guangdong Union 68	China	The cargo ship foundered off Gaolan. Her nine crew were rescued.
Purple Beach	Marshall Islands	The cargo ship caught fire off Cuxhaven, Germany. Fourteen firefighters were airlifted to the ship, but they and her 22 crew were later evacuated.

=== 26 May ===
List of shipwrecks: 26 May 2015
Ship	State	Description
97 Samyong	South Korea	The tug foundered off Busan following the snapping of a cable connecting the boat with a ship it was towing. Two crew were killed.

=== 30 May ===
List of shipwrecks: 30 May 2015
Ship	State	Description
Down North	Canada	The sailing ship foundered in the Baltic Sea off Swinoujscie, Poland with the loss of one of the twelve people on board. Survivors were rescued by the fishing vessel Palucca (Germany). Down North was on a voyage from Swinoujscie to Spitzbergen, Norway.
Miss Natalie	United States	The tug sank in the Mississippi River near Baton Rouge, Louisiana. One of her five crew was reported missing.

== June ==
=== 1 June ===
List of shipwrecks: 1 June 2015
Ship	State	Description
Dong Fang Zhi Xing	China	The ship was traveling on the Yangtze River in Jianli, Hubei Province with 454 people on board when it capsized in a severe thunderstorm. On 13 June, 442 deaths were confirmed, with 12 rescued.

=== 2 June ===
List of shipwrecks: 2 June 2015
Ship	State	Description
Courage	United States	The car carrier was damaged by fire whilst on a voyage from Bremerhaven, Germany to Southampton, Hampshire, United Kingdom. She was consequently scrapped.

=== 8 June ===
List of shipwrecks: 8 June 2015
Ship	State	Description
Teknogas	Malaysia	The LPG tanker issued a distress signal in the South China Sea 200 nautical miles (370 km) off the coast of Vietnam. Reported missing as of 11 June. She later turned up at Palembang, Indonesia, safe and unscathed.

=== 9 June ===
List of shipwrecks: 9 June 2015
Ship	State	Description
KMP Titian Mubarak	Indonesia	The ferry sank in the Makassar Strait (1°07′N 118°43′E). Of the 97 people on board, 65 were rescued by USS Rushmore ( United States Navy) and five by a fishing boat.

=== 10 June ===
List of shipwrecks: 10 June 2015
Ship	State	Description
Xin Hong 328	China	The container ship foundered off Guangzhou. Her eight crew were rescued.

=== 14 June ===
List of shipwrecks: xx June 2015
Ship	State	Description
Koreana	South Korea	The four-masted schooner ran aground and was holed off Yeosu. All 38 people on board were rescued.

=== 18 June ===
List of shipwrecks: 18 June 2015
Ship	State	Description
Wan Dong Fang 298	China	The tanker capsized and sank in the Yangtze near Nanjing.

=== 20 June ===
List of shipwrecks: 20 June 2015
Ship	State	Description
Alur Barito 1	Indonesia	The landing craft ran aground and sank at Banjarmasin.

=== 22 June ===
List of shipwrecks: 22 June 2015
Ship	State	Description
Coastal Pride	India	The cargo ship foundered in the Indian Ocean 24 nautical miles (44 km) south of Daman. Her fourteen crew were rescued by Indian Coast Guard helicopters.
Jindal Kamakshi	India	Jindal Kamakshi The cargo ship developed a list in the Indian Ocean 40 nautical miles (74 km) north west of Mumbai. Her twenty crew were rescued by Indian Navy helicopters and taken to INS Shikra.
Unknown Tugboats	Canada	Two modified workboats being used as tugs sank in the Saint Lawrence River off of Cornwall, Ontario after being pulled under a barge being used for the demolition of the Seaway International Bridge by stronger current than expected, all crew of both boats were rescued with minor injuries.

=== 24 June ===
List of shipwrecks: 24 June 2015
Ship	State	Description
Coastal Pride	India	The cargo ship capsized and sank in the Arabian Sea 15 nautical miles (28 km) off Dahanu. Her fourteen crew were rescued by Indian Coast Guard and Indian Navy helicopters.

=== 25 June ===
List of shipwrecks: 25 June 2015
Ship	State	Description
Hai Bang Da	China	The cargo ship capsized and sank off Zhuhai. Her eleven crew were rescued.

=== 26 June ===
List of shipwrecks: 26 June 2015
Ship	State	Description
Farley Mowat	Netherlands	The ship sank at Shelburne, Nova Scotia, Canada.

=== 29 June ===
List of shipwrecks: 29 June 2015
Ship	State	Description
Chentong 7	China	The barge foundered in the Bohai Sea 40 nautical miles (74 km) east of Jingtang. Her six crew were rescued by helicopter.
Guoliang 7	China	The barge foundered in the Bohai Sea 25 nautical miles (46 km) east of Jingtang. Her crew were rescued by helicopter.
Jiang Hang 99	China	The cargo ship foundered in the Bohai Sea. Her five crew were rescued by helicopter.
Jiang Shung 299	China	The barge foundered in the Bohai Sea 25 nautical miles (46 km) east of Jingtang. Her crew were rescued by helicopter.
Yuxinhuo 13396	China	The cargo ship foundered in the Bohai Sea. Her five crew were rescued by helicopter.

=== 30 June ===
List of shipwrecks: 30 June 2015
Ship	State	Description
Meratus Sumbawa 1	Indonesia	The cargo ship caught fire off Surabaya and was abandoned by her nineteen crew.

== July ==
=== 2 July ===
List of shipwrecks: 2 July 2015
Ship	State	Description
Kim Nirvana-B	Philippines	The ferry capsized and sank off Ormoc, Leyte. Between 50 and 70 of the 173 people on board were reported to have been rescued.

=== 5 July ===
List of shipwrecks: xx July 2015
Ship	State	Description
Taba	Egypt	The ro-ro ferry foundered in the Red Sea 20 nautical miles (37 km) off Safaga, Egypt. All 37 people on board were rescued by the Egyptian Navy. She was on a voyage from Safarga to Dhiba, Saudi Arabia.

=== 6 July ===
List of shipwrecks: 6 July 2015
Ship	State	Description
Chang Fu Xing; Hong Wei 298	China	The cargo ships collided off Ningde. Both crews were evacuated.
Hai Truong 36	Vietnam	The cargo ship ran aground off La Gi and began to sink.

=== 8 July ===
List of shipwrecks: 8 July 2015
Ship	State	Description
Sinaran Andaman	Cambodia	The container ship was driven ashore on Koe Island, Thailand and sank. Her ten crew were rescued by Royal Thai Navy helicopters.

=== 11 July ===
List of shipwrecks: 11 July 2015
Ship	State	Description
Xin Mao	China	The cargo ship was driven ashore at Taizhou. Her fourteen crew were rescued.

=== 13 July ===
List of shipwrecks: 13 July 2015
Ship	State	Description
Heng Run	China	The cargo ship collided with Wan Li 8 (China) and sank off Zhoushan with the loss of at least one of her twelve crew. Survivors were rescued by Chinese Coast Guard and Chinese Navy helicopters, with one crew member swimming ashore.

=== 14 July ===
List of shipwrecks: 14 July 2015
Ship	State	Description
Evgenia P	Greece	The cargo ship was severely damaged by fire at Elefsina.
Pied Piper	United States	The passenger ship ran aground off Woods Hole, Massachusetts. All 113 people on board were taken off by the United States Coast Guard. She was later refloated and taken in to Woods Hole.
Mutiara Persada III	Indonesia	The ferry ran aground off Pulau Tempurung, in the Sunda Strait. Her 142 passengers were evacuated.

=== 16 July ===
List of shipwrecks: 16 July 2015
Ship	State	Description
Mrs Baye	United States	The tug sank in the Charenton Canal at Charenton, Louisiana. Her three crew survived.

=== 17 July ===
List of shipwrecks: 17 July 2015
Ship	State	Description
Alam Manis	Singapore	The cargo ship ran aground off Santa Lucia, Ilocos Sur, Philippines after her cargo of nickel ore shifted. Twenty crew were rescued by Salviscount (Singapore). One crew member suffered a heart attack and died.
Unnamed ship	Egyptian Navy	was struck off Rafah by a missile fired by ISIS forces.

=== 19 July ===
List of shipwrecks: 19 July 2015
Ship	State	Description
Unnamed ship	flag unknown	The ship was sunk in the Mediterranean Sea off Mareesa by Libyan Air Force aircraft. A government spokesman claimed that the vessel was carrying weapons and ammunition that were destined for terrorists in the east of the country.

=== 20 July ===
List of shipwrecks: 20 July 2015
Ship	State	Description
E Tuan Feng Huo 226	China	The cargo ship broke in two and sank whilst being loaded at Wuhan.
Shun Hong Hai 286	China	The cargo ship ran aground off Guangzhou.

=== 21 July ===
List of shipwrecks: 21 July 2015
Ship	State	Description
Jia Hang 233	China	The cargo ship was abandoned off Hong Kong. Her crew were rescued by a Hong Kong Government Flying Service helicopter.
Jin Tai Yi 3	China	The cargo ship was abandoned off Hong Kong. Her crew were rescued by a Hong Kong Government Flying Service helicopter.
Shun Hong Hai 286	China	The cargo ship was abandoned off Hong Kong. Her crew were rescued by a Hong Kong Government Flying Service helicopter.
Zhong Chuan 19	China	The cargo ship was abandoned off Hong Kong. Her crew were rescued by a Hong Kong Government Flying Service helicopter.
Unidentified barge	United States	The retired 50-foot (15.2 m) barge was scuttled as an artificial reef in the North Atlantic Ocean 3.1 nautical miles (5.7 km; 3.6 mi) off Barnegat, New Jersey, at 39°45.500′N 074°01.650′W.
Unidentified barge	United States	The retired 50-foot (15.2 m) barge was scuttled as an artificial reef in the North Atlantic Ocean 3.1 nautical miles (5.7 km; 3.6 mi) off Barnegat, New Jersey, at 39°45.350′N 074°01.600′W.

=== 22 July ===
List of shipwrecks: 22 July 2015
Ship	State	Description
Akel	Liberia	The coaster collided with Sengul K (Turkey) and sank in the Black Sea off Riva, Beykoz, Turkey with the loss of one of her twelve crew. Survivors were rescued by the Turkish Coast Guard.

=== 23 July ===
List of shipwrecks: 23 July 2015
Ship	State	Description
Jiang Xia Xiang	China	The cargo ship collided with Bai Chi (China) and sank in the Yangtze at Waigaoqiao. Her sixteen crew were rescued.
Unnamed ship	Egypt	At least twenty-one people died when a passenger boat and a cargo ship collided on the River Nile.

=== 26 July ===
List of shipwrecks: 26 July 2015
Ship	State	Description
Flying Cat 4	Greece	The high-speed catamaran ferry ran aground off Tinos. All 239 passengers were evacuated by local boats.

=== 31 July ===
List of shipwrecks: 31 July 2015
Ship	State	Description
Sunflower Daisetsu	Japan	The ro-pax ferry caught fire off Hokkaido with the loss of a crew member. The remaining 71 passengers and 22 crew were evacuated from the ship by the Japanese Coast Guard.

== August ==
=== 7 August ===
List of shipwrecks: 7 August 2015
Ship	State	Description
Focomar	Panama	The cargo ship suffered engine problems in the Gulf of Aden off Socotra Island, Yemen and was abandoned by her 24 crew. They were rescued a few days later from the island by Libeccio (Italian Navy). Focomar was towed in to Djibouti by Mubarak Challenger (United Arab Emirates).

=== 8 August ===
List of shipwrecks: 8 August 2015
Ship	State	Description
Jiang Quan 6	China	The cargo ship struck a reef whilst trying to avoid a collision with a fishing vessel and was holed. She was consequently beached near Zhoushand.

=== 11 August ===
List of shipwrecks: 11 August 2015
Ship	State	Description
Merry Star	South Korea	The container ship ran aground off Hakata-ku, Fukuoka and was holed.

=== 12 August ===
List of shipwrecks: 12 August 2015
Ship	State	Description
Jia Ying 6	China	The cargo ship capsized in the Yangtze Estuary. One of her six crew was reported missing.

=== 15 August ===
List of shipwrecks: 15 August 2015
Ship	State	Description
Dharma Kenkana II	Indonesia	The ferry ran aground in the Kapuas River. All 873 passengers were evacuated. She was on a voyage from Semarang to Pontianak.
Wonderful Stars	Philippines	The ferry caught fire at Ormoc. All 544 people on board were evacuated.

=== 20 August ===
List of shipwrecks: 20 August 2015
Ship	State	Description
Guo Xing 1	Belize	The cargo ship collided with another vessel and foundered in the Yellow Sea off Pyeongtaek, South Korea. Two crew were reported missing.

=== 21 August ===
List of shipwrecks: 21 August 2015
Ship	State	Description
Aloha	United States	The superyacht struck a reef and sank in the Aegean Sea off Mykonos, Greece. All on board survived.
Louise	United States	The tug capsized at Port Arthur, Texas. Her four crew were rescued.

=== 24 August ===
List of shipwrecks: 24 August 2015
Ship	State	Description
Sabuk Nusantara 34	Indonesia	The ferry ran aground off Pulau Ngolin Island (7°42′S 130°56′E). Her 171 passengers were evacuated.
Zhe Ding 49067	China	The coaster was driven ashore in a typhoon at Zhoushan. Her five crew were rescued.

=== 25 August ===
List of shipwrecks: 25 August 2015
Ship	State	Description
Urania	Italy	The research vessel capsized in a floating dock at Livorno with the loss of one life.

=== 27 August ===
List of shipwrecks: 27 August 2015
Ship	State	Description
Unnamed ship	Unknown	Capsized off the coast of Libya near Zuwara with fifty people on board.
Unnamed ship	Unknown	Capsized off the coast of Libya near Zuwara with four hundred people on board.

== September ==
=== 2 September ===
List of shipwrecks: 2 September 2015
Ship	State	Description
Meratus Banjar 2	Indonesia	The container ship sprang a leak, capsized and sank in the Java Sea 100 nautical miles (190 km) north east of Surabaya. Two of her crew were reported missing.

=== 3 September ===
List of shipwrecks: 3 September 2015
Ship	State	Description
Zhe Pu 01833	China	The cargo ship struck a reef and sank off Ningbo-Zhoushan. Her five crew were rescued.

=== 5 September ===
List of shipwrecks: 5 September 2015
Ship	State	Description
Caledonian	Unknown	The fishing vessel capsized with four people on board while hauling fish aboard in the Pacific Ocean off the west coast of Vancouver Island, British Columbia, Canada. The vessel eventually sank and minor pollution was reported. One crew member was rescued and the bodies of the remaining three crew members were recovered.

=== 10 September ===
List of shipwrecks: 10 September 2015
Ship	State	Description
Shoyo 18	Thailand	The tug sank at Penang, Malaysia. Her seven crew were rescued.

=== 12 September ===
List of shipwrecks: 12 September 2015
Ship	State	Description
Mugunghwa No. 6	South Korea	The fisheries protection vessel ran aground in the Yellow Sea west of Hanapdeokdo Island and was holed. Her eleven crew were rescued.

=== 22 September ===
List of shipwrecks: 22 September 2015
Ship	State	Description
Heng Sheng 688	China	The cargo ship was in collision with another vessel and sank at Guangzhou. A crew member was reported missing.

=== 27 September ===
List of shipwrecks: 27 September 2015
Ship	State	Description
Lincoln	South Africa	The 42-metre (138 ft) fishing trawler sank off Hangklip, False Bay, South Africa in rough weather. Nine survivors were found also 11 bodies had been recovered. One crewman remained missing. Salvaged, repaired and returned to service.

=== 28 September ===
List of shipwrecks: 28 September 2015
Ship	State	Description
Harken 10	Canada	The tug sank in the Strait of Georgia. Her crew survived.

=== 30 September ===
List of shipwrecks: 30 September 2015
Ship	State	Description
Cosmos	South Korea	The ferry sank in the East China Sea south of Jeju with the loss of one of her thirteen crew. Survivors were rescued by Hyundai HT-112 (South Korea).

== October ==
=== 1 October ===
List of shipwrecks: 1 October 2015
Ship	State	Description
El Faro	United States	Hurricane Joaquin: The ro-ro cargo ship foundered in the Atlantic Ocean off the Bahamas with the loss of her thirty-three person crew. Later analysis of the sea state indicate El Faro was hit by a rogue wave of over 23 m.
Emerald Express	Panama	Hurricane Joaquin: The landing craft was driven ashore on Crooked Island, Bahamas.
Ilmanui	Indonesia	The cargo ship capsized and sank at Perkasa.
Minouche	Bolivia	Hurricane Joaquin: The cargo ship foundered in the Caribbean Sea off Haiti. Her twelve crew took to the lifeboat. USCGC Northland ( United States Coast Guard) was reported to be searching for them, but they were rescued by Cronus Leader (Panama) and Falcon Arrow (Bahamas) under the AMVER scheme.

=== 4 October ===
List of shipwrecks: xx October 2015
Ship	State	Description
Hua Fu You 2	China	The tanker was driven ashore on Donghai Island in a typhoon. She was refloated on 17 October.
Jinhaiyue	China	The cargo ship was driven ashore on Zhanjiang East Island in a typhoon. She was refloated on 19 October.

=== 5 October ===
List of shipwrecks: 5 October 2015
Ship	State	Description
Yuan Da 668	China	The cargo ship sank in a typhoon at Zhanjian with the loss of one of her six crew.
Yue An Yun 63	China	The cargo ship foundered off Yangjiang. Her crew were rescued.

=== 6 October ===
List of shipwrecks: 6 October 2015
Ship	State	Description
Flinterstar	Netherlands	The cargo ship collided with Al Oraiq (Marshall Islands) and sank in the North Sea off Blankenberge, West Flanders, Belgium. Her eleven crew were rescued. The wreck was deemed a hazard to shipping. The bow section was refloated on 27 June 2016. The stern section is scheduled to be refloated in August 2016.
Haidar	Lebanon	The livestock carrier capsized at Porto Vila de Conde, Brazil. Her crew had been evacuated before she capsized.

=== 11 October ===
List of shipwrecks: 11 October 2015
Ship	State	Description
An Phu Kiang 079	Vietnam	The cargo ship ran aground and sank in the South China Sea off Con Co Island. Her ten crew were rescued by a fishing vessel.

=== 17 October ===
List of shipwrecks: 17 October 2015
Ship	State	Description
Foxhound	Philippines	The cargo ship was abandoned in the Bismark Sea. She subsequently came ashore on Long Island, Papua New Guinea.
Paramushir	Russia	The coaster capsized and sank in the Pacific Ocean 3 nautical miles (5.6 km) off Shumshu Island, Kuril Islands with the loss of four of her five crew. The survivor was rescued by Aldan (Russia).

=== 19 October ===
List of shipwrecks: 19 October 2015
Ship	State	Description
Annie Moon	United States	The tug sank at Galena Park, Texas.

=== 21 October ===
List of shipwrecks: 21 October 2015
Ship	State	Description
Rong Jiag 003	China	The cargo ship capsized in the Bohai Sea. One of her six crew was rescued by helicopter, five were reported missing.

=== 23 October ===
List of shipwrecks: 23 October 2015
Ship	State	Description
Los Llanitos	Mexico	Hurricane Patricia: The cargo ship was driven ashore at Barra de Navidad. Her twenty-seven crew were rescued by helicopter. She subsequently broke her back. It was planned that she would be scuttled, but later it was decided that she would be scrapped in situ. Los Llanitos broke in two on 10 October 2017.

=== 25 October ===
List of shipwrecks: 25 October 2015
Ship	State	Description
Leviathan II	Canada	The whale-watching boat sank off the coast of Vargas Island, near the resort of Tofino, Vancouver Island. Five people were killed and one reported missing.
Peter R. Gellatly	United States	Hurricane Patricia: The tug was driven ashore in Galveston Bay.

=== 30 October ===
List of shipwrecks: 30 October 2015
Ship	State	Description
Hoang Phuc	Vietnam	The cargo ship capsized 7 nautical miles (13 km) off Ho Chi Minh City with the loss of one of her eighteen crew. Twelve were rescued, five were reported trapped in the ship.

=== Unknown date ===
List of shipwrecks: Unknown date 2015
Ship	State	Description
Foxhound	Philippines	The cargo ship sprang a leak and foundered in the Bismark Sea off Lae, Papua New Guinea. Her twenty-one crew took to the lifeboat and were subsequently rescued by COSCO Shanghai (China).
Pathara Marine 5	Thailand	The coastal container ship capsized and sank the Gulf of Siam sometime in October. All four crew were trapped inside and died.

== November ==
=== 1 November ===
List of shipwrecks: 1 November 2015
Ship	State	Description
Ya Zar Tun	Myanmar	The ferry sank on the Chindwin River, Sagaing Region while heading for Sae Zin from Monywa. Approximately thirty people are saved and eight bodies recovered, out of an unknown number of passenger (estimated at seventy to one hundred).

=== 2 November ===
List of shipwrecks: 2November 2015
Ship	State	Description
Perla	Iceland	The dredger sank at Reykjavík.

=== 8 November ===
List of shipwrecks: 8 November 2015
Ship	State	Description
Soya Maru	Belize	The cargo ship caught fire in the Inland Sea of Japan and was abandoned by her ten crew. She was on a voyage from Osaka to Haimen, China.

=== 14 November ===
List of shipwrecks: 15 November 2015
Ship	State	Description
Guang Yun	China	The cargo ship collided with Ji Xin 9 (China) in the Taiwan Strait and was severely damaged. Her 26 crew were rescued by Ji Xin 9 (flag unknown). Guang Yun was on a voyage from Zhoushan to Dong Guan.

=== 16 November ===
List of shipwrecks: 16 November 2015
Ship	State	Description
KM Wihan Sejahtera	Indonesia	The ferry capsized off Tanjung Perak. All of the passengers and crew were reported to have been rescued.

=== 18 November ===
List of shipwrecks: 18 November 2015
Ship	State	Description
Le Boreal	France	The cruise ship suffered an engine room fire off the Falkland Islands. All 347 people were evacuated by Royal Air Force helicopters and HMS Clyde (Royal Navy).

=== 20 November ===
List of shipwrecks: 20 November 2015
Ship	State	Description
Hua Chun 19	China	The cargo ship foundered in the Yellow Sea off Qingdao with the loss of a crew member. Five others were reported missing.

=== 21 November ===
List of shipwrecks: 21 November 2015
Ship	State	Description
ARM Uribe	Mexican Navy	The decommissioned Uribe-class patrol vessel was scuttled with explosive charges in the Pacific Ocean 1 nautical mile (1.9 km) off Rosarito, Baja California, Mexico, to create an artificial reef.

=== 22 November ===
List of shipwrecks: 22 November 2015
Ship	State	Description
Guiliang 399	China	The cargo ship collided with Zi Yun 1 (China) off Zhoushan and sank. Four of her eight crew were rescued.

=== 24 November ===
List of shipwrecks: 24 November 2015
Ship	State	Description
Suilven	Fiji	The cargo ship capsized and sank off Suva. Her 34 crew were rescued.

=== 28 November ===
List of shipwrecks: 28 November 2015
Ship	State	Description
Nadezhda	Russia	The tanker was driven ashore and damaged on Sakhalin Island near Nevelsk. She was on a voyage from Vanino to Korsakov.

=== 30 November ===
List of shipwrecks: 30 November 2015
Ship	State	Description
Fortune Life	Panama	The cargo ship foundered in the Philippine Sea 130 nautical miles (240 km) west of Vigan with the loss of eleven of her nineteen crew. Survivors were rescued by Ashley Lady (Singapore).

== December ==
=== 4 December ===
List of shipwrecks: 4 December 2015
Ship	State	Description
Hanjin Aqua	Panama	The container ship ran aground in the Sunda Strait off Sangiang Island, Indonesia. She was refloated on 6 January 2016.

=== 10 December ===
List of shipwrecks: 10 December 2015
Ship	State	Description
City	Panama	The cargo ship ran aground and partially sank at Sagata, Japan. Her eighteen crew were rescued.

=== 11 December ===
List of shipwrecks: 11 December 2015
Ship	State	Description
Shearwater	United States	The retired 166-foot (50.6 m) purse seiner was scuttled as an artificial reef in 120 feet (37 m) of water in the North Atlantic Ocean off the coast of Delaware at 38°31.661′N 074°30.607′W.

=== 13 December ===
List of shipwrecks: 13 December 2015
Ship	State	Description
Royal 16	Vietnam	The cargo ship was driven ashore at Legazpi, Philippines.

=== 14 December ===
List of shipwrecks: 14 December 2015
Ship	State	Description
William E Strait	United States	The tug collided with the towboat Margaret Ann (United States) and sank in the Mississippi River.

=== 16 December ===
List of shipwrecks: 16 December 2015
Ship	State	Description
Thorco Cloud	Antigua and Barbuda	The cargo ship collided with Stolt Commitment (Cayman Islands) and sank in the Singapore Strait. Six of her twelve crew were reported missing. Three bodies were recovered from near the wreck of the ship in late December; one of them was confirmed to be a crew member. The other two bodies were later also confirmed to be missing crew members.

=== 17 December ===
List of shipwrecks: 17 December 2015
Ship	State	Description
Maple Lea	Germany	The cargo ship grounded in Lake Saint-Louis, Quebec shortly after leaving Montreal; refloated four days later on 21 December.

=== 19 December ===
List of shipwrecks: 19 December 2015
Ship	State	Description
Marina Baru	Indonesia	The passenger ferry capsized and sank off the south coast of Sulawesi, 13 nautical miles (24 km) south east of Siwa. About 40 of the 125 passengers and crew were rescued. 60 people were killed in the sinking.

=== 22 December ===
List of shipwrecks: xx December 2015
Ship	State	Description
Star Pride	Bahamas	The cruise ship ran aground off Coiba, Panama. Her passengers were taken off by Star Breeze and Tere Moana (both Bahamas).

=== 27 December ===
List of shipwrecks: 27 December 2015
Ship	State	Description
Granam St Anne	Haiti	The coaster foundered off the coast of Cuba. Her twelve crew were rescued by two United States Coast Guard helicopters.

=== unknown 2015 ===
List of shipwrecks: unknown 2015
Ship	State	Description
USS Massapequa	United States Navy	The Natick-class tugboat sank enroute to the Marshall Islands sometime in 2015.
