= Thorco Shipping =

Danish shipping company

Thorco Projects A/S
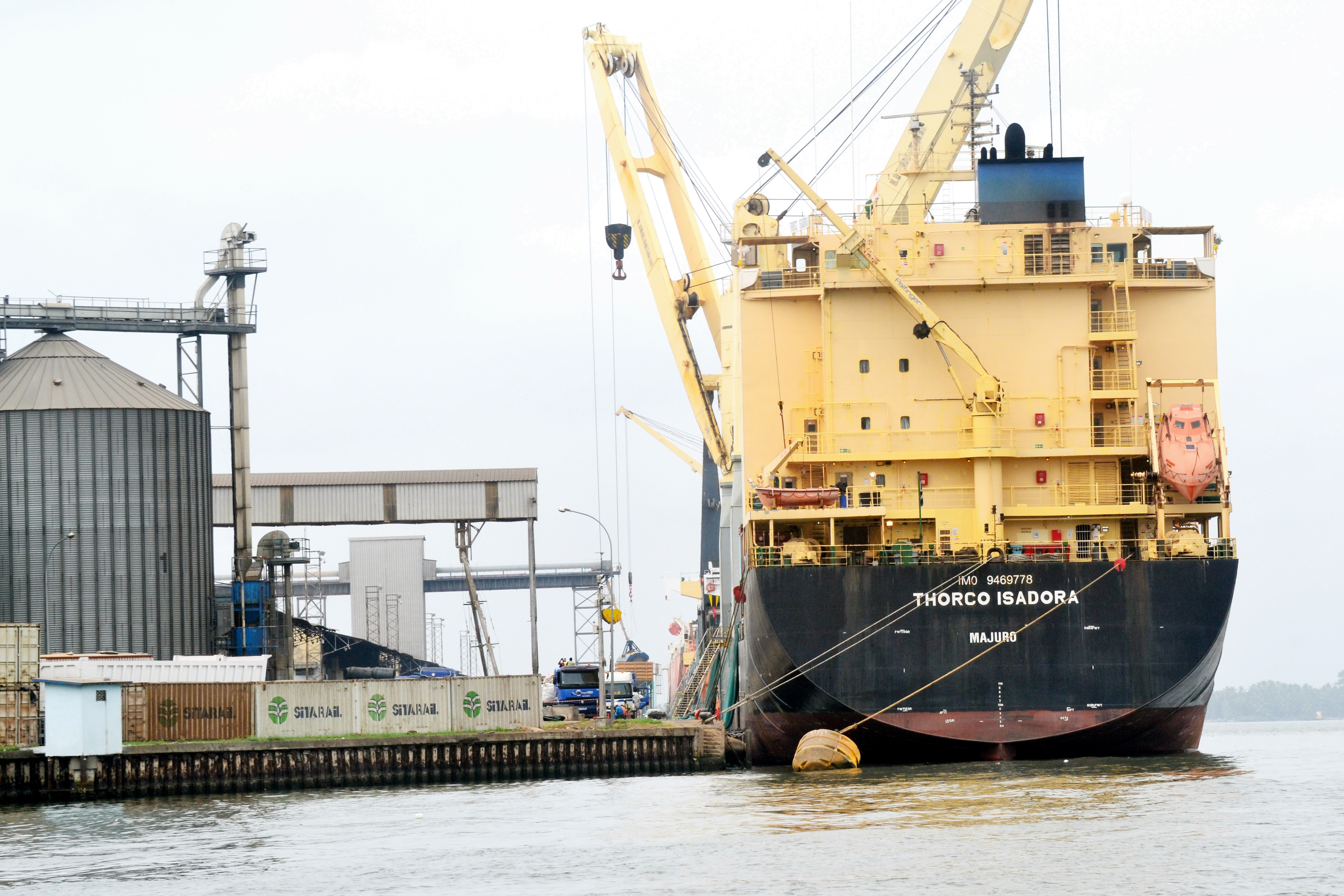
- The Thorco Isadora in the port of Abidjan
- Company type: Private
- Industry: Shipping
- Founded: 2003; 23 years ago, in Svendborg, Denmark
- Defunct: 2023; 3 years ago
- Fate: Acquired by Norden and integrated into Norden Projects & Parcelling
- Successor: Norden Projects & Parcelling
- Headquarters: Copenhagen, Denmark
- Key people: Thomas Mikkelsen (CEO)
- Owner: Thornico Group of Companies (2003–23); Norden (2023)
- Website: www.thorcoprojects.com

Thorco Projects A/S was a Danish shipping company based in Copenhagen, Denmark.

== Overview ==
Founded by Svendborg, Denmark in 2003, it operated 55 vessels through 10 offices at the end of 2012. The company was the operator of the ship MV Thorco Cloud, which sank in the Singapore Strait following a collision in December 2015.

A decade after its founding, it merged with Clipper Projects in July. Formerly a subsidiary of the Thornico Group of Companies, the Danish operator had 15 offices in 13 countries and operated a fleet of about 70 multipurpose ships of sizes between 7,800 and 20,000 DWT.

On July 3, 2023, Thorco Projects was acquired by Norden and its assets integrated into a new company unit, Norden Projects & Parcelling.
