= Sinking of Dalniy Vostok =

2015 maritime incident in the Sea of Okhotsk

Coordinates: 56.4833°N 150.4167°E

- Sinking of Dalniy Vostok (Far Eastern Federal District)
- Date: 1 April 2015
- Location: Russia Sea of Okhotsk
- Also known as: Stende (until 2014)
- Participants: 132
- Outcome: Ship sank, 63 rescued
- Deaths: 57
- Missing: 12

The Russian-flagged fishing trawler Dalniy Vostok (Russian: «Дальний Восток» [ˈdalʲnʲɪj vɐsˈtok]; "Far East") sank on 1 April 2015, off Russia's Kamchatka Peninsula in the Sea of Okhotsk. Fifty-seven of the ship's 132 crew members were confirmed dead, with rescue operations underway for survivors. The freezer trawler sank 183 nautical miles (330 kilometers) west of Krutogorovsky, a settlement in Kamchatka's Sobolevsky District.

Sixty-three crew members were rescued by other fishing vessels, and 12 remain missing. Although recovery efforts continued on 3 April, the TASS news agency reported that it was believed that the missing drowned in the engine room, and that all survivors had been rescued.

== Background ==
Crew on board by citizenship
Citizenship	No.	Ref.
Russia	78	
Burma (Myanmar)	42	
Vanuatu	5	
Ukraine	4	
Latvia	3	

Dalniy Vostok, a 104-metre (341 ft), 5,700-ton trawler, was built in 1963 as a whaling factory ship, and had international number IMO 8730429. The vessel was constructed as Stende (named for the city of Stende, Latvia) by the ship builders GP Chernomorskiy Sudostroitelnyy Zavod, (Note: Part of the pre-dissolution Baltiyskiy Zavod Production Association.) Nikolayev, Soviet Union (now Mykolaiv, Ukraine). She was classified under the (still in use) Soviet era general designation BATM (Bolshoy Avtonomniy Trawler Morozilniy [Big Autonomous Trawler Reefer]), which covers freezer trawlers as well as certain other types of factory ship. Dalniy Vostok was one of the vessels harassed by anti-whaling Greenpeace activists in the north Pacific in 1975. The vessel operated in the Canary Islands until 2014, when she was purchased by the Russian company Magellan LLC. At the time of the accident, the vessel was sailing out of Nevelsk, on the island of Sakhalin. The ship was fishing off the western coast of the Kamchatka Peninsula, in the Sea of Okhotsk in the Russian Far East. There were 132 crew on board, from Russia, Burma, Ukraine, Latvia and Vanuatu. The ship had an estimated value of $30 million; retiring and replacing Dalniy Vostok prior to the accident would have cost approximately $40 million.

== Sinking ==
On the morning of 1 April 2015, the engine room of Dalniy Vostok flooded, causing the vessel to quickly fill with sea water and sink within 15 minutes. Vladimir Markin, official press agent for the Russian Investigative Committee said the most likely cause was a collision with ice, while Sergey Khabarov, emergencies commission chairman for the Kamchatka region blamed the 80-ton weight of the catch being hauled on board.

The ship sank so swiftly that the veteran captain, Aleksandr Pritotskiy, did not have time to send a distress signal. Most of the fatalities in the frigid water (as cold as 0–5 °C; 32–41 °F) were caused by hypothermia, which also affected all the rescued crew. The ship's captain and its first officer were among those killed. Over two dozen fishing boats aided in the rescue, and the Russian Emergencies Ministry dispatched an Mi-8 helicopter with a medical team and rescue crew. Russian officials said over 1,300 people aided in the rescue effort.

== Aftermath ==
The Sakhalin branch of the Far East transportation department has launched a criminal investigation for safety violations resulting in the death of two or more persons. Those found guilty could face up to a seven-year sentence.

A full crew manifest has been published in the tabloid daily, Komsomolskaya Pravda. The daily reported several irregularities: that the boat was already "loaded to the eyeballs" with an unmanageable 1150 tons of pollock; that the ship had an insufficient number of lifeboats for the crew; that the ship had been certified as seaworthy, although the captain described it as a worn-out old wreck in constant need of urgent repair; and that the abnormally high number of foreign crew indicated they were underpaid illegal workers.

Reuters described the accident as "one of Russia's worst maritime disasters in decades", part of a "poor safety history" that included the death of 122 people in 2011 when the tourist boat Bulgaria sank on the Volga River, and the death of over 50 people on board when a drilling rig sank off Sakhalin in the same year. President Putin had faced widespread criticism for his slow reaction to the sinking of the submarine Kursk in 2000, which killed the entire crew of 118. Komsomolskaya Pravda quoted expert sources as saying unanimously that while the crew will inevitably be blamed, the real problem is the system.

Magellan LLC has announced it is conducting an internal audit. The government announced that the families of the dead will receive one million rubles from state agencies.

== Reactions ==
After the sinking, many governments expressed shock and sympathy, and conveyed their nations condolences over the large number of lives lost. Among them:

- Russia: Russian President Vladimir Putin expressed "deep condolences to the families and those close to those killed".
- Armenia: Armenian President Serzh Sargsyan sent his condolences to Russian President Vladimir Putin over the loss of life in Russian territorial waters related to this accident.
- China: Chinese President Xi Jinping "offered his deep condolences to all victims aboard the fishing freezer trawler that sank off Russia's Kamchatka peninsula, and showed sincere sympathies to the relatives of the victims".
- Kazakhstan: Kazakhstan President Nursultan Nazarbayev "personally and on behalf of all the Kazakhstanis expressed condolence to the families of the deceased and wished the soonest recovery to the injured."
- United States: The United States embassy in Moscow said in a statement: "It is terrible to see how many human lives this tragedy has taken".
- Seychelles: Seychelles President James Michel expressed the condolences of the people of Seychelles, remarking in a statement: "The government and people of Seychelles join me in expressing our heartfelt sympathies and deepest condolences to the people of Russia and the families of the victims following this tragic loss of human life".
- Myanmar: Myanmar (Burmese) authorities stated that it was extremely unlikely that the Myanmar nationals (who made up almost a third of the crew) were legally employed by Magellan LLC. U Kyaw Htin Kway, general secretary of the Myanmar Overseas Employment Agency Federation, said "Myanmar does not send workers to fishing boats. If they are illegal then they won’t get insurance or compensation. It is a problem". Two of the recruitment agencies responsible for sending seamen aboard the admitted they falsifying workers' registration cards.

== See also ==
- List of shipwrecks
- List of shipwrecks in 2015
