= Asterix (tug) =

History

United Kingdom
- Name: Asterix
- Owner: Østensjø Rederi AS, Haugesund
- Operator: Solent Towage Ltd, Southampton
- Port of registry: Southampton
- Builder: Damen, Gorinchem
- Fate: Total loss 30 March 2015

General characteristics
- Type: StanTug 1205
- Tonnage: 25 GT
- Length: 13.08m
- Beam: 5.28m
- Draught: 1.87m
- Installed power: 601bhp
- Propulsion: Diesel
- Speed: 9.5 knots

Asterix was a small tug/mooring launch which capsized and was a total loss in March 2015 while operating at the marine terminal of Fawley Refinery in Southampton Water, England

== Description and service ==
Asterix was a small tug, used for towing and mooring at ExxonMobil's Fawley oil refinery in Hampshire, England. She was a standard "StanTug 1205" built in 2013 by Damen Group of Gorinchem, Netherlands and one of a pair of tugs they delivered to Fawley in 2014.

The tug measured 25 gross tons and was 13.08 metres in length, 5.28 metres beam and with a service draught of 1.85 metres. Her twin engines totalled 442 kW giving a towing power of 9 tons bollard pull. Asterix was normally operated by a crew of two and was in service with Solent Towage Ltd, a UK subsidiary of Norwegian shipowner Østensjø Rederi AS of Haugesund.

== Capsizing and loss ==
On the evening of 30 March 2015, while assisting the Luxembourg-registered oil tanker Donizetti to sail from Fawley, Asterix was "girted" (Note: "A towline under tension will exert a heeling moment on the tug if the line is secured around amidships and is leading off towards the beam. As with any vessel which heels over due to an external force, a righting lever is formed as the centre of buoyancy moves towards the centre of the tug's underwater volume, countering the heeling moment and pushing the tug back upright. However, if the force in the towline is sufficiently powerful, it may overcome the tug's righting lever and cause it to capsize or girt.") and capsized, later sinking. One crew-member was thrown clear and quickly rescued, despite high winds, but the other was trapped in the partially flooded wheelhouse for more than one hour. He was subsequently seen when the tug briefly rolled upright and only then rescued by breaking a wheelhouse window. The successful raising of Asterix was announced on 12 April 2015, though she was subsequently declared a total loss.

== See also ==
- List of shipwrecks in 2015
