= Cruceros Skorpios =

- Industry: Cruises
- Founded: 1978
- Founder: Don Constantino Kochifas Cárcamo
- Headquarters: Puerto Montt, Chile, Puerto Montt, Chile
- Area served: Laguna San Rafael, Chiloé, Melinka, Castro
- Products: Ships' accommodation
- Services: Passenger transportation
- Website: Cruceros Skorpios

Cruceros Skorpios is a cruise company of Chile based in Puerto Montt which offers fjord cruises throughout South Chile until Laguna San Rafael.

Ex-MV Skorpios I 1978-2008

== History ==
Passenger shipping and Skorpios SA is a family business founded in 1978 by Don Constantino Kochifas Carcamo. Today the company has one of the largest shipping fleets in the Southern Cone, 2 tourist vessels and more than 37 cargo ships, a shipyard and naval arsenal, shipping terminals of passengers and freight, baths in Fjord Quitralco, offices in Santiago, Puerto Montt, Punta Arenas and Puerto Natales.

The shipping owner Constantino Kochifas Cárcamo, of greek origins, began shipping entrepreneur activities in the regional coastal area of Puerto Montt in 1956, with his brothers. Subsequently, they are forming their own independent shipping company operating cargo ships to the Aysen region. It was thus realized that development could have the shipping tourism in Patagonia, founding Maritime Cruise Skorpios ("scorpion" in greek). It started cruise to San Rafael Glacier in 1976, in a small cargo ship named MV Mimi, then carrying only 12 passengers per trip. Then, built in 1978, the MV Skorpios I, the first tour Cruise Ship company in Chile, decommissioned in the channels of southern Chile in 2008 reaching to perform more than 600 cruises to Laguna San Rafael. The Ship was finally Scrapped in 25 October 2018.

In 1988, the MV Skorpios II is inaugurated, with capacity for 106 passengers, being the largest ship Skorpios fleet capacity and currently maintains the original route of the MV Skorpios I, now known as Route Chonos. In 1995, the company inaugurated a new cruise ship, the MV Skorpios III, for 90 passengers. In 2003, Skorpios Cruises extends its operations to the region of Magallanes, inaugurating a new tourist route called Route Kaweskar, to the glaciers of the Southern Ice Field, comprising route from Puerto Natales to the glaciers of the Southern Ice Field. For this purpose, the MV Skorpios III moves and a maritime terminal in Puerto Natales is built.

== Fleet ==
=== Former Coastal Cruises ===
- 1978-2008 > MV Skorpios I

=== Current Coastal Cruises ===
- 1988- > MV Skorpios II
- 1995- > MV Skorpios III

=== Accident ===
On February 5, 2015, the 70 meter long cruise ship, with 89 passengers and 31 crew members aboard, MV Skorpios II ran aground and stranded during normal conditions appreciating the Chile Fjords near Puerto Montt, Chile. The Ship was left on the beach, high and dry until high tide, without any damage, injuries or pollution released. Passengers were transferred to a Chilean patrol boat and taken back. Ship was following floated out again and went back to Puerto Montt.
