= MV Sorrento (2003) =

Scrapped ropax ferry

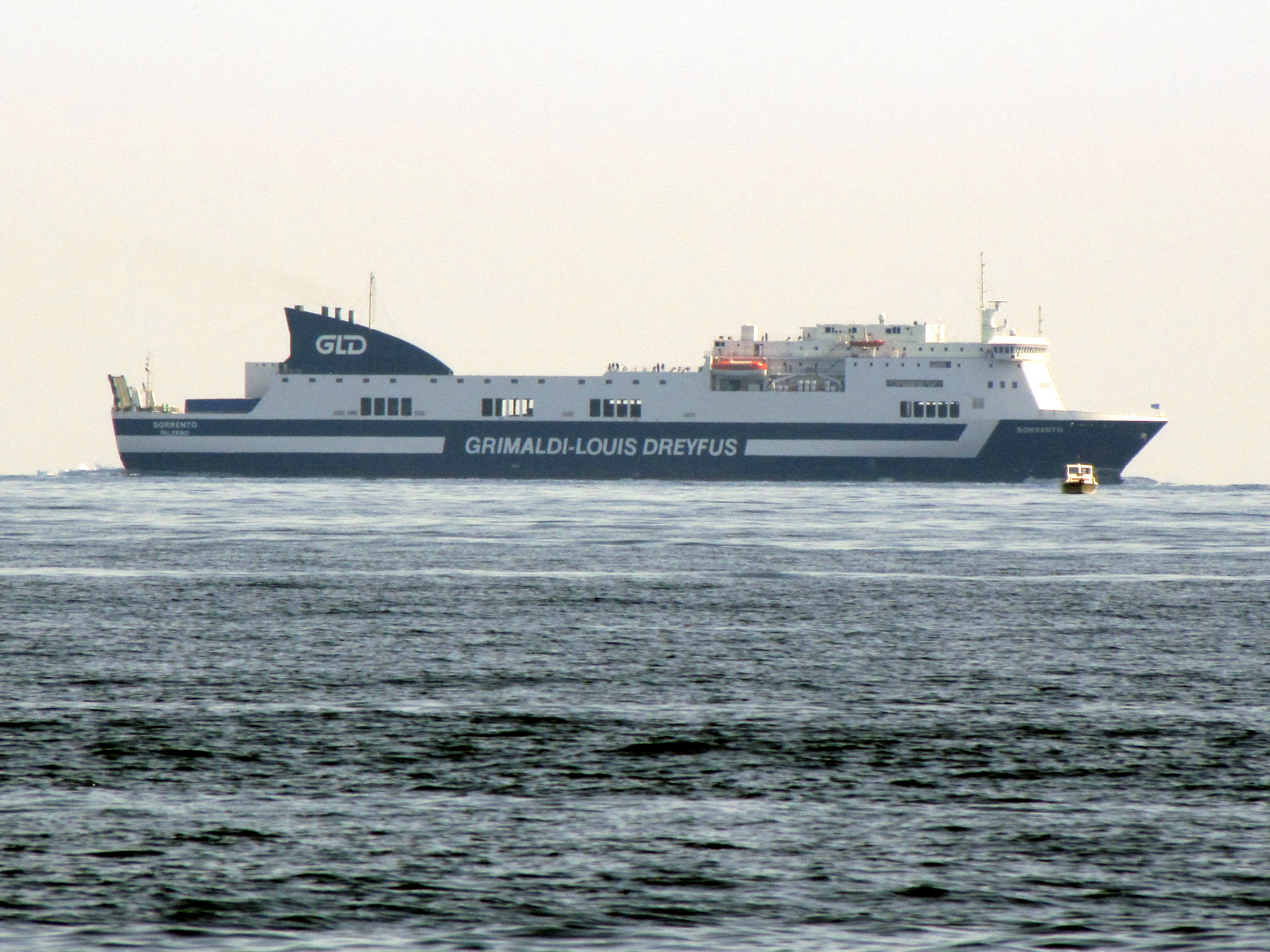

History

Italy
- Name: Eurostar Valencia (2003-2006); Sorrento (2006-2015)
- Namesake: Town of Sorrento
- Owner: Grimaldi Group
- Operator: Grimaldi Ferries (2003–07); Grimaldi Lines (2007–14); Acciona Trasmediterránea (since 2014)
- Port of registry: Palermo, Italy
- Builder: Cantiere Navale Visentini
- Yard number: 197
- Launched: 18 January 2003
- Maiden voyage: 5 July 2003
- Out of service: 28 April 2015
- Identification: IMO number: 9264312
- Fate: Scrapped following fire 2015

General characteristics
- Type: Ro-pax ferry
- Tonnage: 26,000 GT; 7,500 DWT
- Length: 186.50 metres (611 ft 11 in)
- Beam: 25.60 metres (84 ft 0 in)
- Draught: 6.62 metres (21 ft 9 in)
- Installed power: 2 x Wärtsilä 9L46C diesel engines 18,900 kilowatts (25,300 hp)
- Speed: 23 knots (43 km/h)
- Capacity: 1,000 passengers; 160 cars

Sorrento was a ro-pax ferry which was built in 2003 as Eurostar Valencia. She was renamed in 2006. On 28 April 2015, she caught fire off Mallorca, Spain.

== Description ==
Sorrento was 186.50 metres (611 ft 11 in) long, with a beam of 25.60 metres (84 ft 0 in). She had a draught of 6.62 metres (21 ft 9 in). The ship was powered by two Wärtsilä 9L46C diesel engines, rated at 18,900 kilowatts (25,300 hp). They could propel her at 23 knots (43 km/h). The ship had capacity for 1,000 passengers and 160 cars. She was assessed as 26,000 GT, 7,500 DWT.

== History ==
Eurostar Valencia was built as yard number 197 in 2003 by Cantiere Navale Visentini, Donada, Italy for the Grimaldi Group. She was launched on 18 January 2003 and was delivered on 16 June. Her port of registry is Palermo. Initially operated by Grimaldi Ferries, Eurostar Valencia started her maiden voyage on 5 July when she departed Salerno for Valencia, Spain. She then operated on various route in the Mediterranean Sea calling at Palermo, Salerno, Tunis, Valencia and Valletta. In January 2005, she was transferred to Civitavecchia, operating on routes to Bastia, Cagliari, Porto Vecchio and Toulon. She was renamed Sorrento on 13 November 2006.

From Sorrento was operating on the Salerno - Palermo - Tunis and Civitavecchia - Trapani - Tunis routes. In 2009, she was placed on the Civitavecchia - Trapani - Tunis - Palermo - Salerno - Tunis - Civitavecchia route. In July 2010, she was transferred to the Livorno - Valencia route, followed by a transfer in April 2012 to the Brindisi - Igoumenitsa - Patras route, On 3 March 2014, she was chartered to Atlantica di Navigazione. and was operated by Acciona Trasmediterránea on the Palma de Mallorca - Valencia route.

=== 2015 fire ===
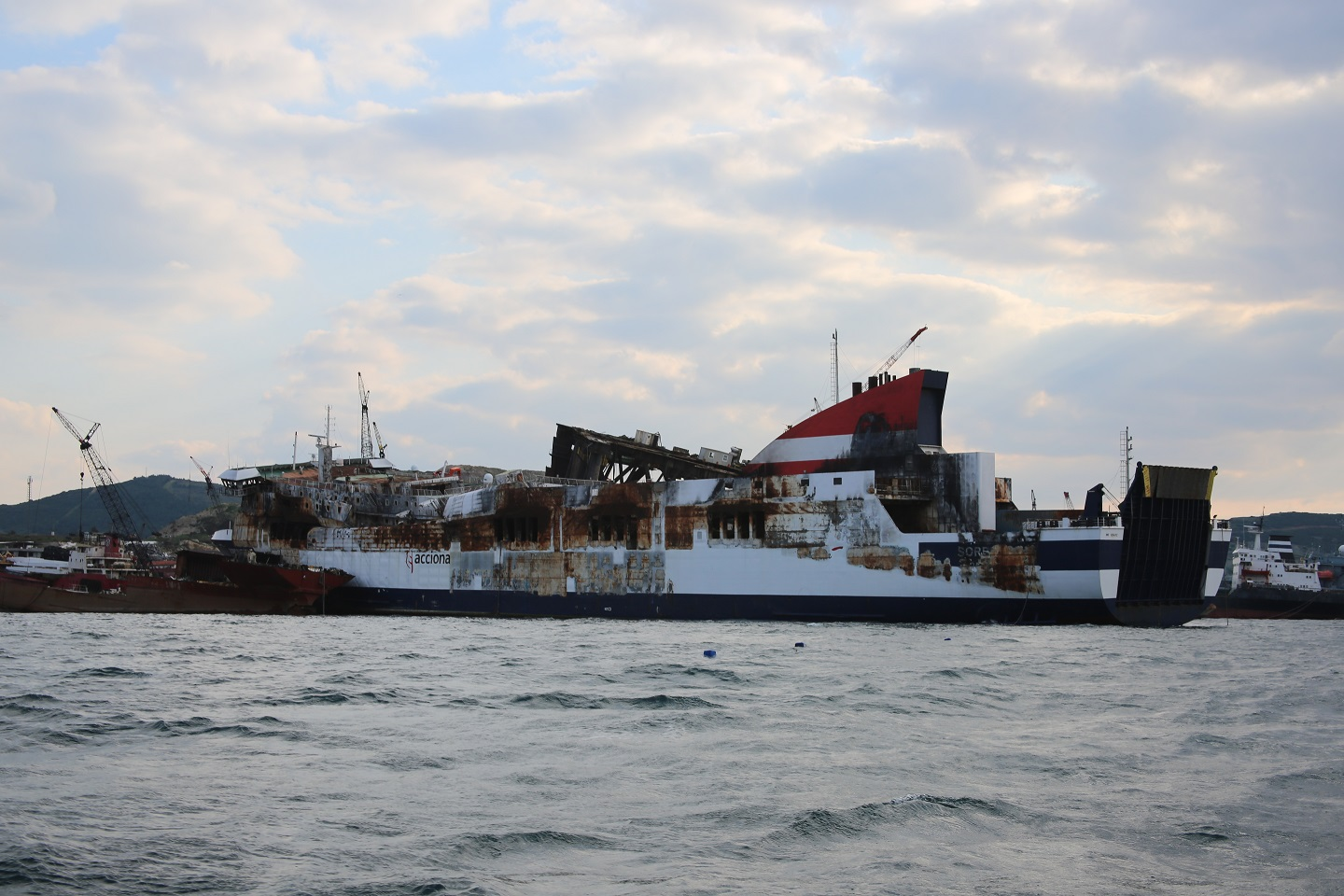
Sorrento during its scrapping at Aliağa on March 27, 2016.

On 28 April 2015, Sorrento caught fire whilst on a voyage from Palma de Mallorca to Valencia. The ship was 15 nautical miles (27 km) off Mallorca when a fire was discovered on one of the car decks. An emergency was declared and a number of vessels went to the assistance of Sorrento, including the ferries Publia and Visemar One. Publia rescued most of the 156 passengers and crew, who had left the ship by lifeboat. Four crew members were injured. They were taken off by helicopter and transferred to hospital in Palma de Mallorca. The Ports de Balears said in a Twitter post that they feared that Sorrento might sink.

On 29 April 2015, it was announced that efforts would be made to bring the stricken ferry to a harbour in the Balearic Islands. This was welcomed by environmentalists, who criticized a decision two weeks earlier to tow a burning fishing vessel out of port in the Canary Islands. The Oleg Naydenov subsequently foundered and created an oil spill. Sorrento had developed cracks in her hull, and was in danger of sinking some 25 nautical miles (46 km) off Majorca. If she were to sink, this would have an adverse effect on the Sa Dragonera natural park. The weather forecast for the days ahead was for increased winds and wave height. The burnt out ferry was subsequently towed to Sagunto, north of Valencia, where it arrived on 6 May.
