= MV Jindal Kamakshi =

Cargo Ship, Container Ship
Vessel Identification
- Name: Jindal Kamakshi
- Former name: Bona Faith (Until 2009 Aug)
- IMO Number: 9528419
- Flag: India
- MMSI Number: 419804000
- Callsign: AVBW

Technical Data
- Vessel type: General Cargo
- Gross tonnage: 7,460 tons
- Summer DWT: 9,107 tons

Additional Information
- Home port: Mumbai
- Builder: Damen Yichang Shipyard Yichang, China
- Owner: Jitf Waterways - Mumbai, India
- Manager: Jitf Waterways - Mumbai, India

MV Jindal Kamakshi is a container ship i.e. a feeder ship which mainly transfers shipping containers to another ship port.

== Incident ==
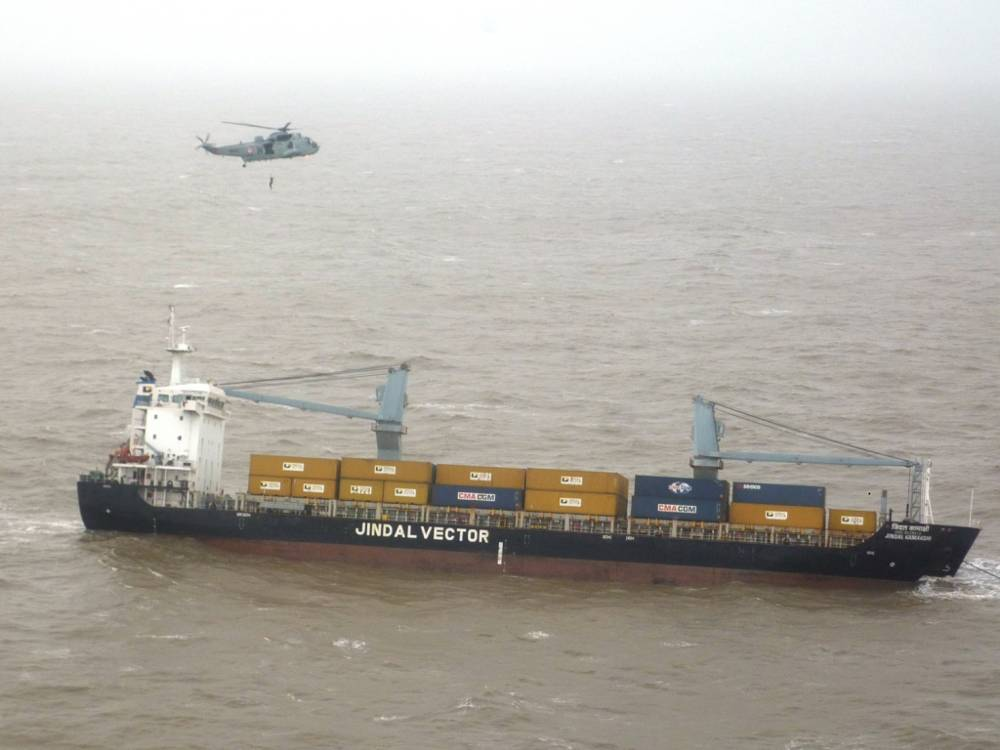
An Indian Navy helicopter flying above the ship during the search and rescue operation

The cargo ship developed a list in the Indian Ocean, 40 nautical miles (74 km) north west of Mumbai. Indian Navy received a distress call at 2310 IST on 21 June 2015. A Sea King 42C helicopter was sent for rescue and her twenty crew were airlifted. They were taken to INS Shikra for medical attention at 0905 on 22 June 2015. The vessel has been towed to safety.
