= MV Skorpios I =

Watercraft

History
- Name: Skorpios I
- Owner: Cruceros Skorpios
- Operator: Cruceros Skorpios
- Port of registry: 1978–2008: Puerto Montt, Chile
- Launched: 1978
- Christened: 1978
- Maiden voyage: 1978
- Out of service: 2008
- Fate: Scrapped in October 2018

General characteristics
- Type: Cruise ship
- Length: ~50 m (164 ft 1 in)
- Decks: 4 (4 passenger accessible)
- Installed power: 2 engines
- Propulsion: Twin screw
- Speed: 10 knots (19 km/h)
- Capacity: 68 passengers

MV Skorpios I was a Chile-registered cruise ship owned and operated by Cruceros Skorpios. She had simple decorated wood style interior and copper plates covering the hull to avoid ice shocks at the wood structure. The ship was scrapped on 25 October 2018. Because Owner was Greek, named ship and company according the Island Skorpios.

== Gallery ==
a stop in thermal pools in 1985
