= MV Skorpios III =

Chile-registered cruise ship

History
- Name: Skorpios III
- Owner: Cruceros Skorpios
- Operator: Cruceros Skorpios
- Port of registry: 1995: Puerto Montt, Chile
- Launched: 1995
- Christened: 1995
- Maiden voyage: 1995
- Identification: IMO number: 9143908; MMSI number: 725001100; Callsign: CBSK
- Status: Operating

General characteristics
- Type: Cruise ship
- Tonnage: 1,597 gt
- Length: 69 m (226 ft 5 in)
- Beam: 10 m (32 ft 10 in)
- Draught: 3.30 m (10 ft 10 in)
- Decks: 4 (4 passenger accessible)
- Installed power: 1800 hp
- Propulsion: Twin screw
- Speed: 14 knots (26 km/h)
- Capacity: 90 passengers
- Crew: 34
- Notes: Autonomy 2000 miles

MV Skorpios III is a Chile-registered cruise ship owned and operated by Cruceros Skorpios. The Ship was built in 1995 in the Skorpios, Chile shipyard under Chilean regulations and international navigation as SOLAS and IMO. It is classified by ABS (American Bureau of Shipping), Class Nr 951.93.18, A1 ice. It was remodeled in 2012, in his hotel equipment and booths. It has a length of 70 meters, a width of 10 meters and a draft of 3.30 meters, displacing 1,600 tons with International Load Line Certificate and certificate of registration number 2869 of the Directorate General of Maritime Territory of Chile. Its capacity is up to 90 passengers, based on 45 double cabins.
