= MV Maersk Rubicon =

Container ship grounded in Indonesia in 2015

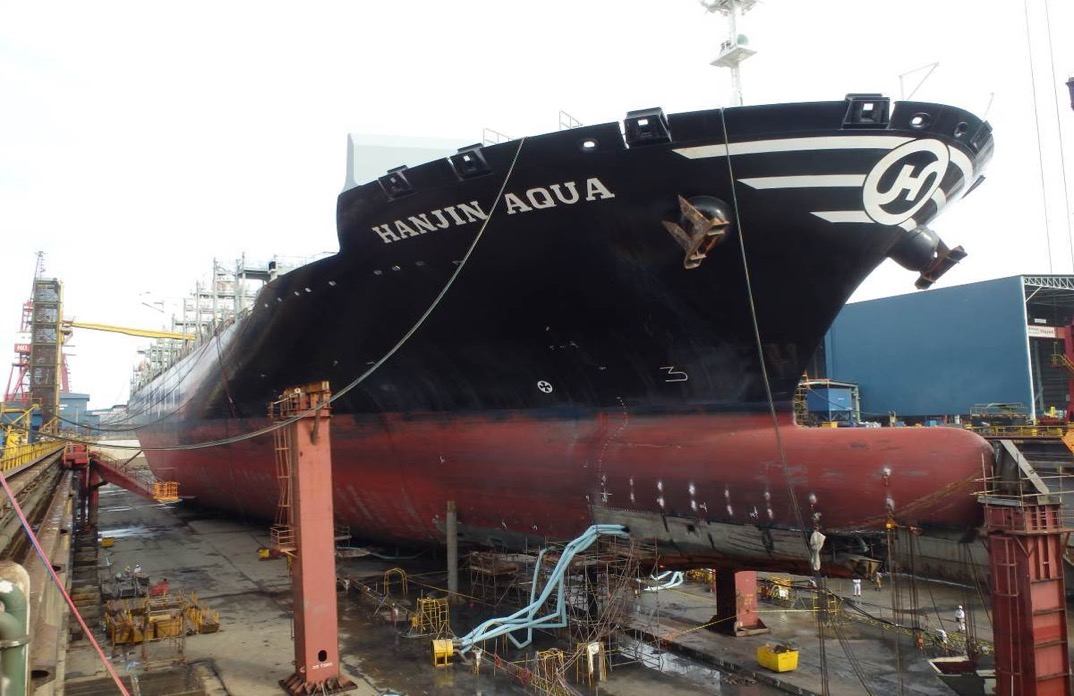
- The MV Maersk Rubicon, then known as the Hanjin Aqua drydocked in Singapore in February 2016.

History
- Name: Maersk Rubicon (2020-present); Kmarin Aqua (2016-2020); Hanjin Aqua (2012-2016)
- Owner: Maersk
- Port of registry: 2011-present: Singapore, Singapore; 2019–2020: Majuro, Marshall Islands; 2012–2020: Panama, Panama
- Builder: Hyundai Samho Heavy Industries Co. Ltd., South Korea
- Yard number: S581
- Laid down: 10 September 2012
- Launched: 02 January 2013
- Identification: IMO number: 9632480; MMSI number: 563101600; Call sign: 9V6677
- Status: In active service

General characteristics
- Class & type: Container ship
- Tonnage: 51,032 GT; 66,347 DWT
- Displacement: 84,395 tonnes
- Length: 249.97 m (820 ft)
- Beam: 37.4 m (123 ft)
- Draught: 13.519 m (44 ft)
- Depth: 18.29 m (60 ft)
- Installed power: 1 × Wärtsilä-Sulzer 6RT-flex 82T (1 × 23,900 kW); 4 × auxiliary engines(4 × 2,000 kW)
- Propulsion: Diesel; single shaft; 1 × fixed pitch propeller; 1 × bow thruster
- Speed: 15.5 knots (28.7 km/h; 17.8 mph) (service)
- Capacity: 4,500 TEU
- Crew: 28

MV Maersk Rubicon, previously known as the Hanjin Aqua and the Kmarin Aqua is a post-Panamax container ship owned and operated by Maersk that ran aground in Indonesia in 2015.

== Construction ==
The ship was constructed by Hyundai Samho Heavy Industries Co. Ltd., South Korea. The keel was laid in September 2012 and the ship was launched in January 2013 as the MV Hanjin Aqua under the flag of Panama and delivered to its owner, Hanjin. The ship is one of several sister ships built in the same period, including:

- MV Hanjin Mar (IMO: 9632507)
- MV Hanjin Marine (IMO: 9632492)
- MV Merkur Harbour (IMO: 9456991)
- MV Merkur Planet (IMO: 9457000)

== History ==
The ship has undergone name and Flag State changes throughout its service life, including:

- MV Hanjin Aqua flagged in Panama, owned and operated by South Korean shipping company Hanjin, before the company's bankruptcy in August 2016.
- MV Kmarin Aqua flagged in the Marshall Islands.
- MV Maersk Rubicon, flagged in Singapore and owned by Danish shipping company Maersk.

=== Grounding in Indonesia ===
Location in Indonesia where the ship grounded in 2015

On 4 December 2015, whilst sailing as the Hanjin Aqua, the ship ran into rocks in the Sunda Strait off the coast of Indonesia whilst en route from Adelaide to Jakarta. As a result, significant damage was caused to the forward end of the ship, flooding a number of ballast tanks and the forward cargo hold, as well as damaging the ship's bow thruster.

Initially, the ship's crew attempted to refloat the vessel without assistance before a salvage operation was undertaken to remove the ship from the rocks. The ship was successfully removed from the rocky shallows in January 2016 and taken to Singapore for repairs.
