= Massapequa (YTB-807) =

Tugboat of the United States Navy

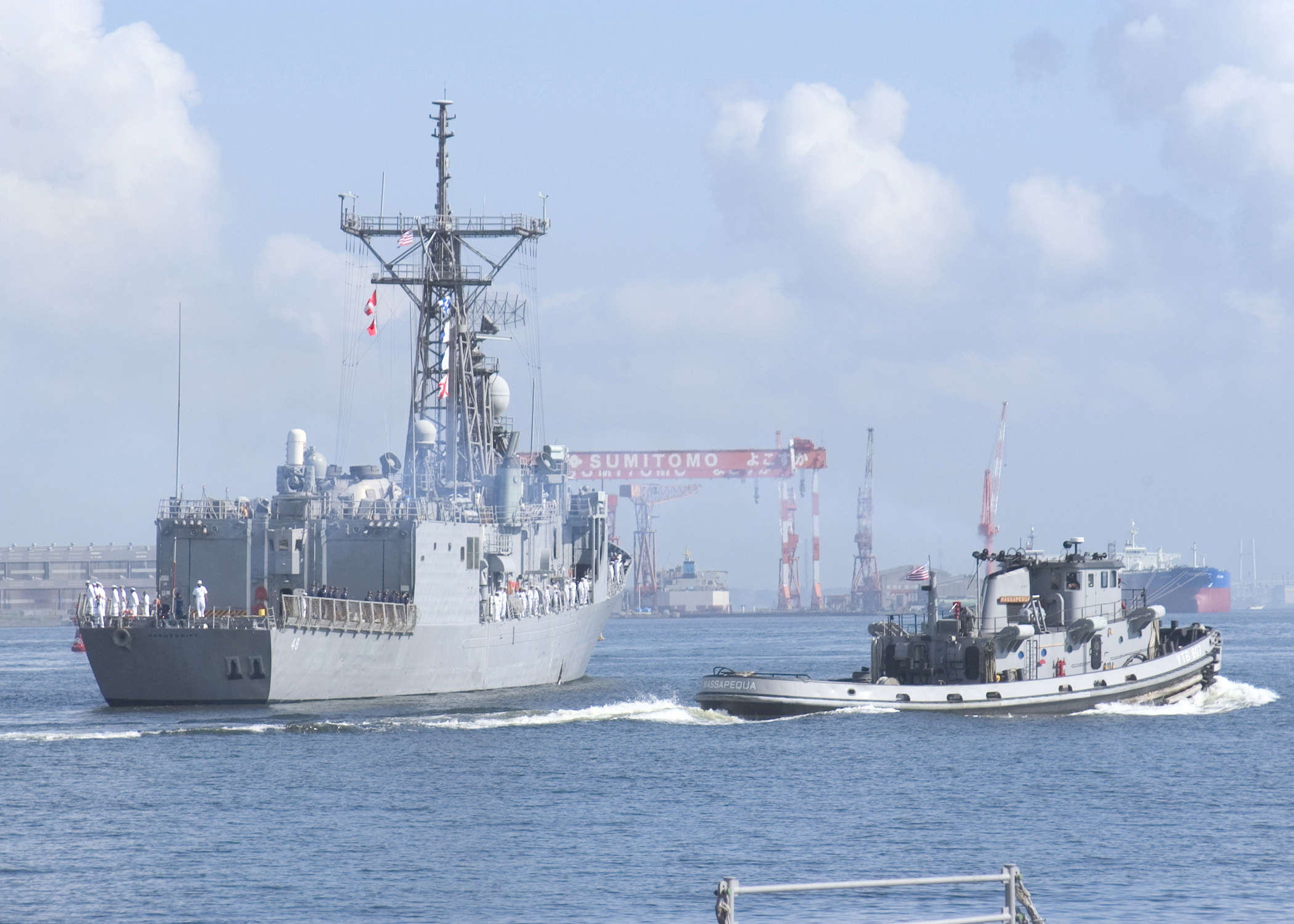
- Massapequa (YTB-807) breaks away from the guided-missile frigate USS Vandegrift (FFG-48) as the frigate departs Yokosuka Bay for the last time as a home-ported vessel of Commander, Fleet Activities Yokosuka (CFAY), Japan, 14 August 2006.

History

United States
- Awarded: 4 March 1969
- Builder: Peterson Builders, Sturgeon Bay, WI
- Laid down: 30 October 1969
- Launched: 27 May 1970
- Acquired: 30 November 1970
- In service: 27 November 1971
- Stricken: 27 September 2011
- Fate: 100% sank whilst under tow by YTB-763 off the east coast of Japan.

General characteristics
- Class & type: Natick-class large harbor tug
- Displacement: 282 long tons (287 t) (light); 341 long tons (346 t) (full)
- Length: 109 ft (33 m)
- Beam: 31 ft (9.4 m)
- Draft: 14 ft (4.3 m)
- Speed: 12 knots (14 mph; 22 km/h)
- Complement: 12
- Armament: None

Massapequa (YTB-807) was a United States Navy Natick-class large harbor tug named for Massapequa, New York.

== Construction ==
The contract for Massapequa was awarded 4 March 1969. She was laid down on 30 October 1969 at Sturgeon Bay, Wisconsin, by Peterson Builders and launched 27 May 1970.

== Operational history ==
Delivered 30 November 1970, Massapequa served at Naval Station Yokosuka, Japan.

Stricken from the Navy List 27 September 2011. Naval Vessel Register lists ex-Massapequa as 'Stricken, to be disposed of by Navy sale'. "The Following text is likely the buyers trying to hide the fact that this Tugboat sank whilst under tow by YTB-763 in-route to the Marshall Islands. Both boats were bought by the same buyer. YTB-807 100% sank off the east coast of Japan during bad weather after being forced out to sea by an inept naval officer". Another source suggests that she sank en route to the Marshall Islands.
