= MS Clio =

Ship built in 1998

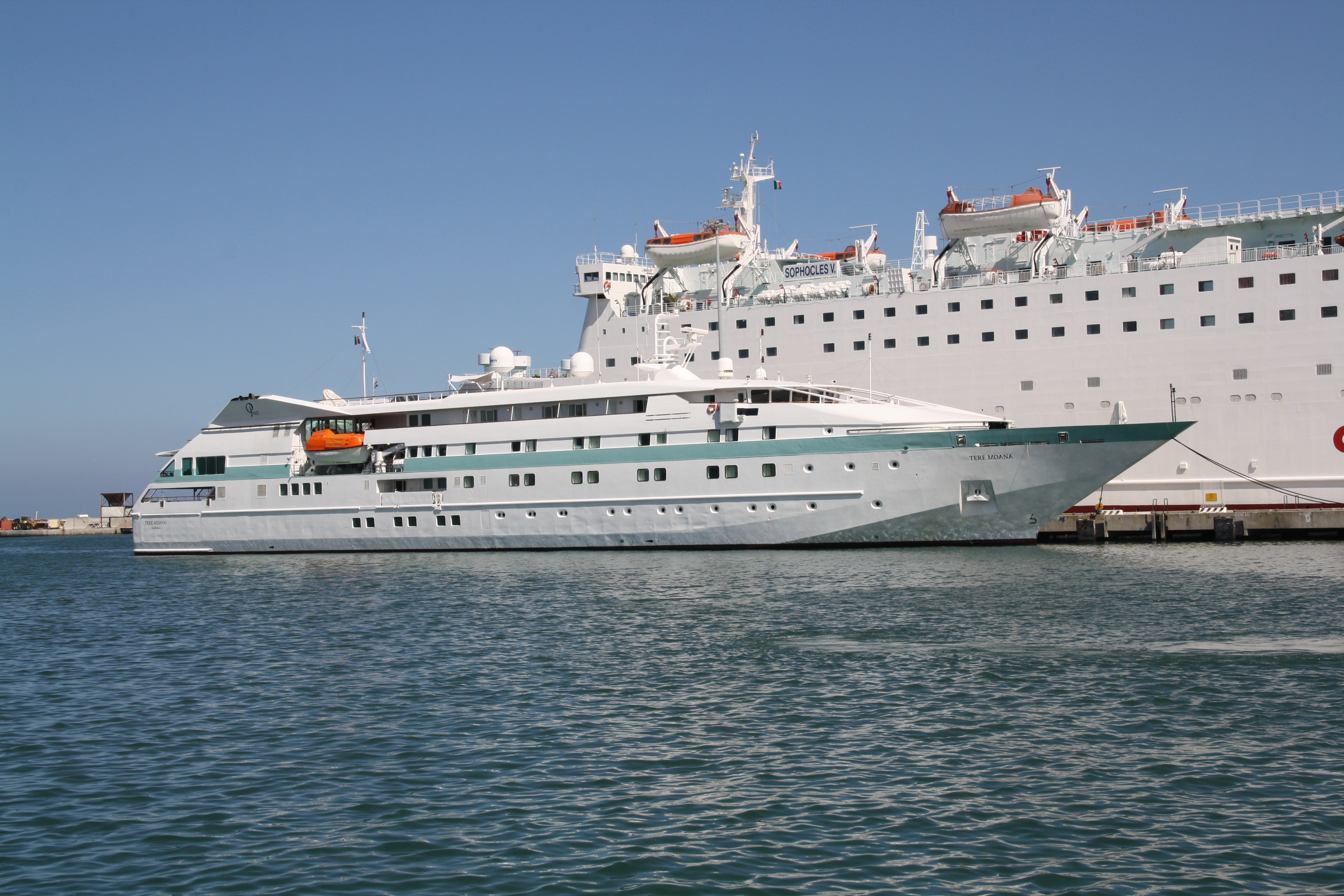
- Tere Moana.

History
- Name: 1998–2012: Le Levant; 2012–2016: Tere Moana; 2016 onwards: Clio
- Owner: 1998–2012: Compagnie du Ponant; 2012–2015: Paul Gauguin Cruises; 2015 onwards: GCCL Cayman Fleet 1
- Operator: 1998–2012 Compagnie du Ponant; 2012–2015: Paul Gauguin Cruises
- Port of registry: 1998–2012: Mata-Utu (Wallis & Futuna Islands), France; 2012–2016: Nassau, Bahamas; 2016 onwards: Valletta, Malta
- Builder: Chantiers Alstom Leroux Naval, St. Malo, France
- Yard number: 625
- Launched: May 1998
- In service: 1998
- Identification: Call sign: 9HA4306; IMO number: 9159830; MMSI number: 249596000
- Fate: In service

General characteristics
- Tonnage: 3,504 GT
- Length: 100 m (328 ft 1 in)
- Beam: 14 m (45 ft 11 in)
- Draft: 3.5 m (11 ft 6 in)
- Speed: 14 knots (26 km/h; 16 mph)
- Capacity: 90 passengers
- Crew: 60

MV Clio, (formerly Le Levant and Tere Moana), is a cruise ship owned and operated by Grand Circle Cruise line. The ship was built at the Alstom Leroux shipyard in St. Malo, France in 1998.

== History ==
The ship was originally built in 1998. Its initial operations were likely focused on luxury cruises, given Compagnie du Ponant's reputation for offering high-end cruise experiences primarily around the French territories and beyond. She operated with Compagnie du Ponant as Le Levant until December 2012 when she was refurbished and transferred to Paul Gauguin Cruises, operating under the name Tere Moana. She now specialises in European, Caribbean, and Latin American cruises.

The name Tere Moana translates into Ocean Traveller in Tahitian.

In August 2015, Paul Gauguin Cruises sold the Tere Moana to Grand Circle Cruises. The ship was renamed Clio and began sailing for Grand Circle Cruises, under the flag of Malta in July 2016.

== Facilities ==
Clio has two restaurants and two bars. She also features the Deep Nature Spa, a fitness center and a swimming pool.

== Gallery ==
These are images of Clio in her previous livery as Le Levant.

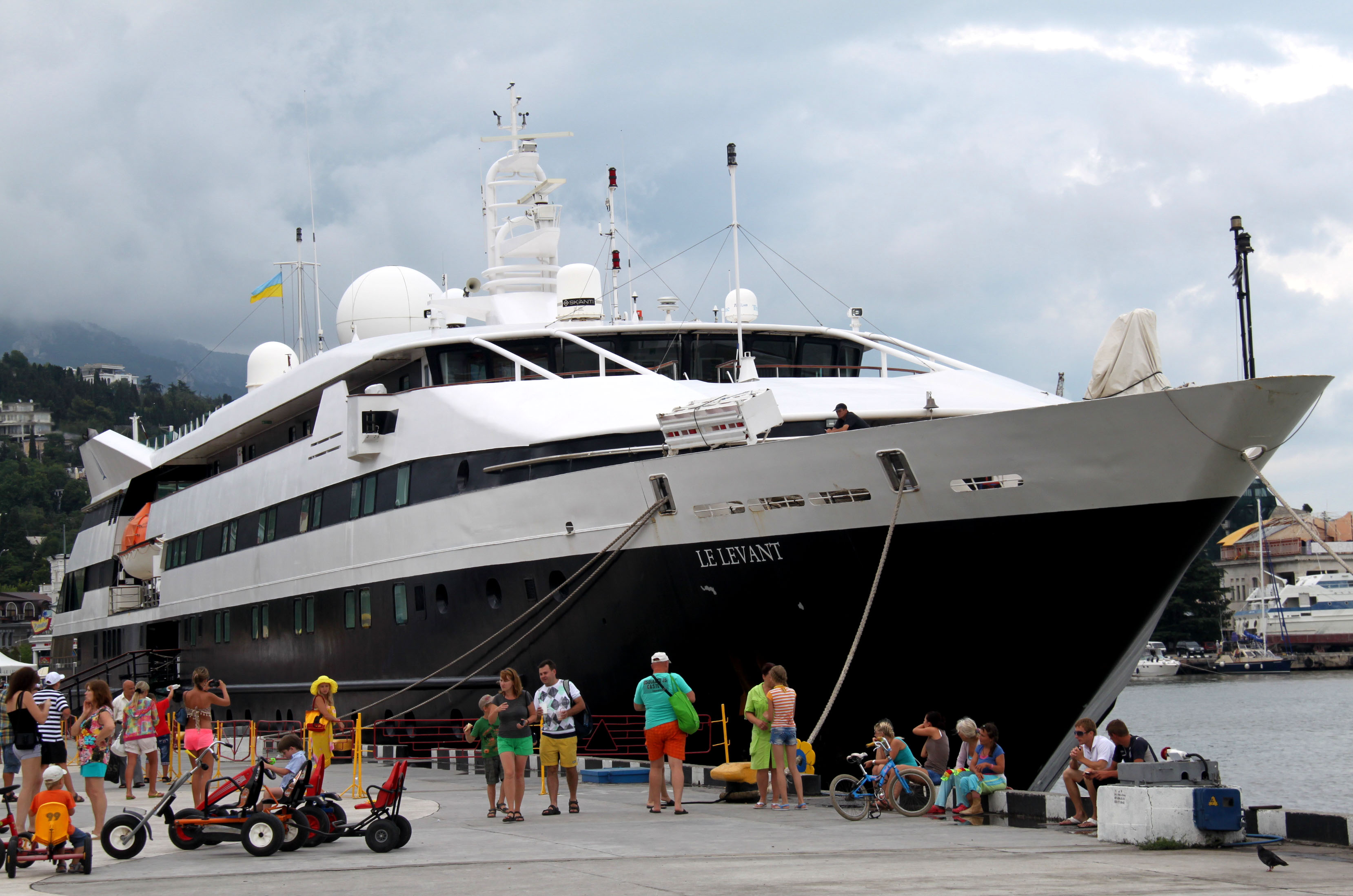

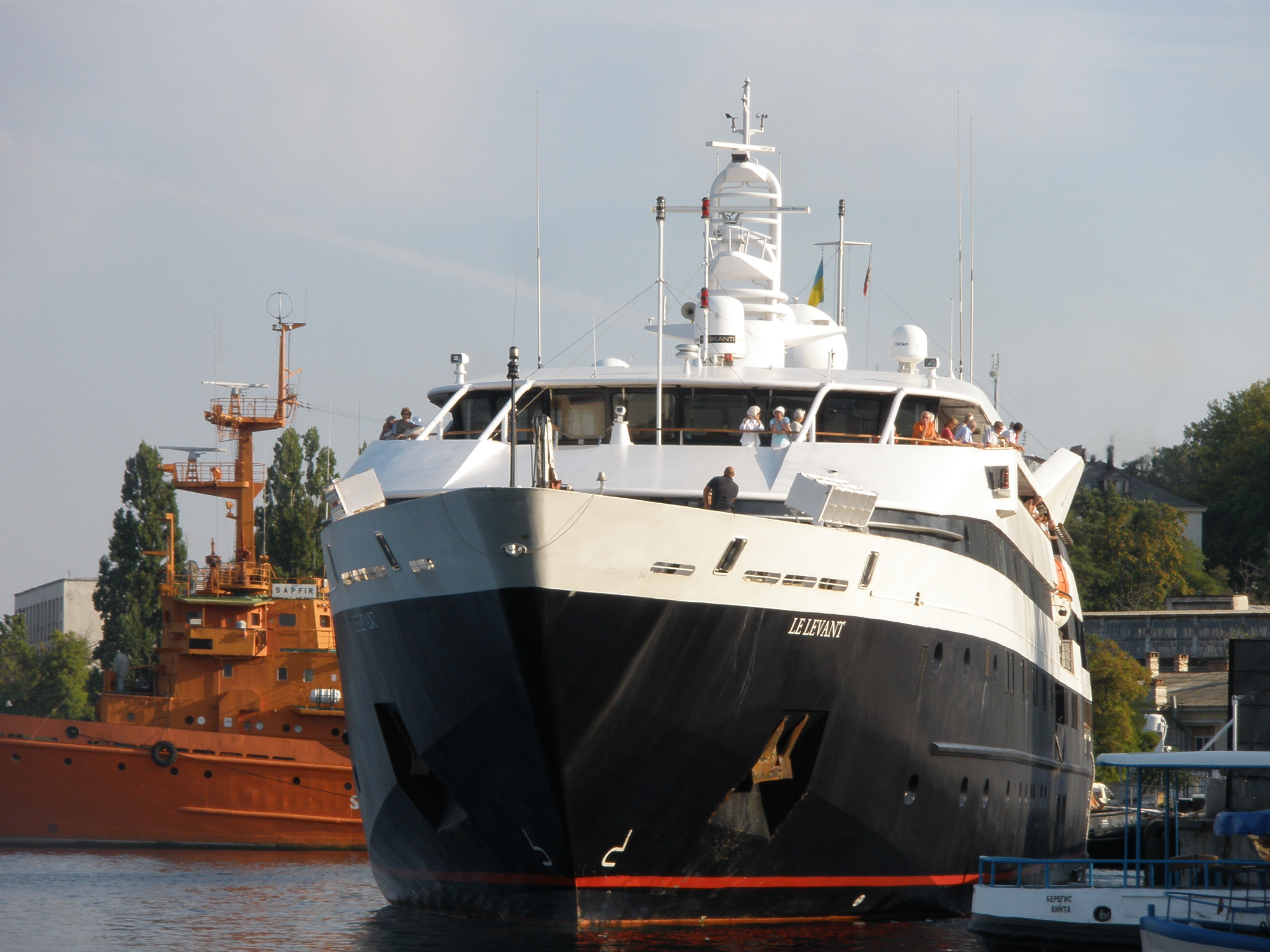

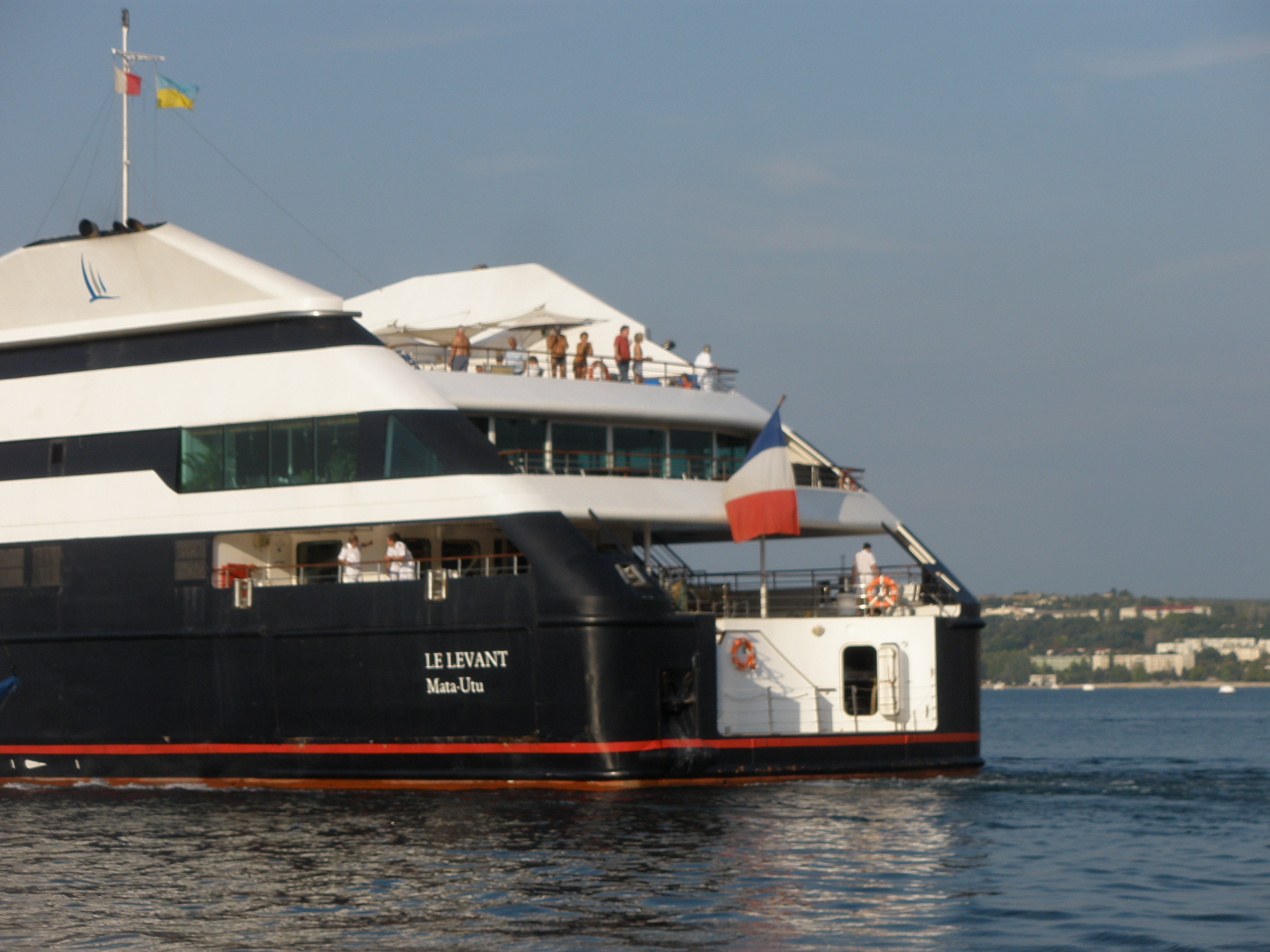

As Tere Moana in Panama, February 2015

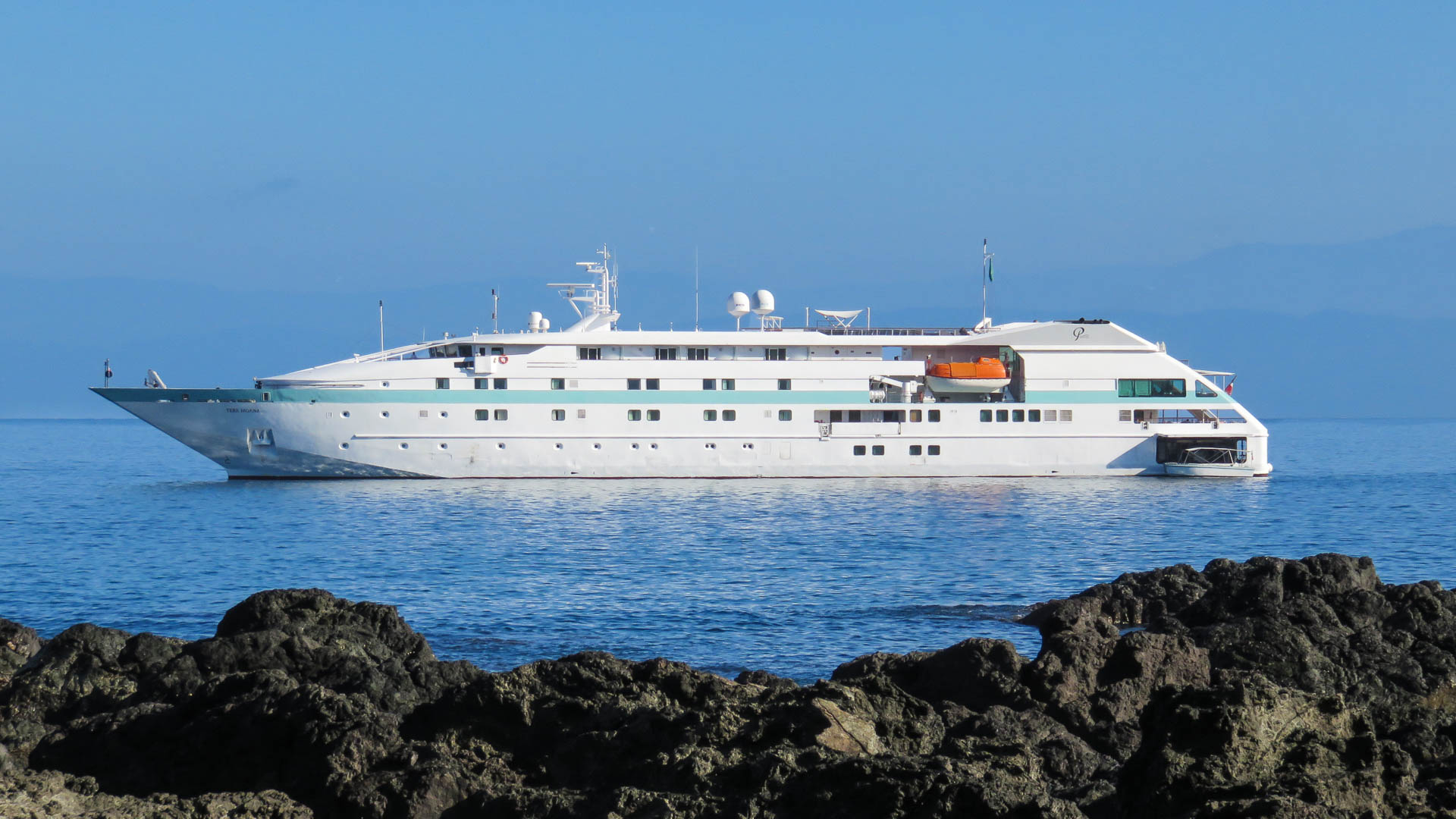
Tere Moana February 2015
