= MV Thorco Cloud =

General cargo ship sunk in a collision in the Strait of Singapore in 2015

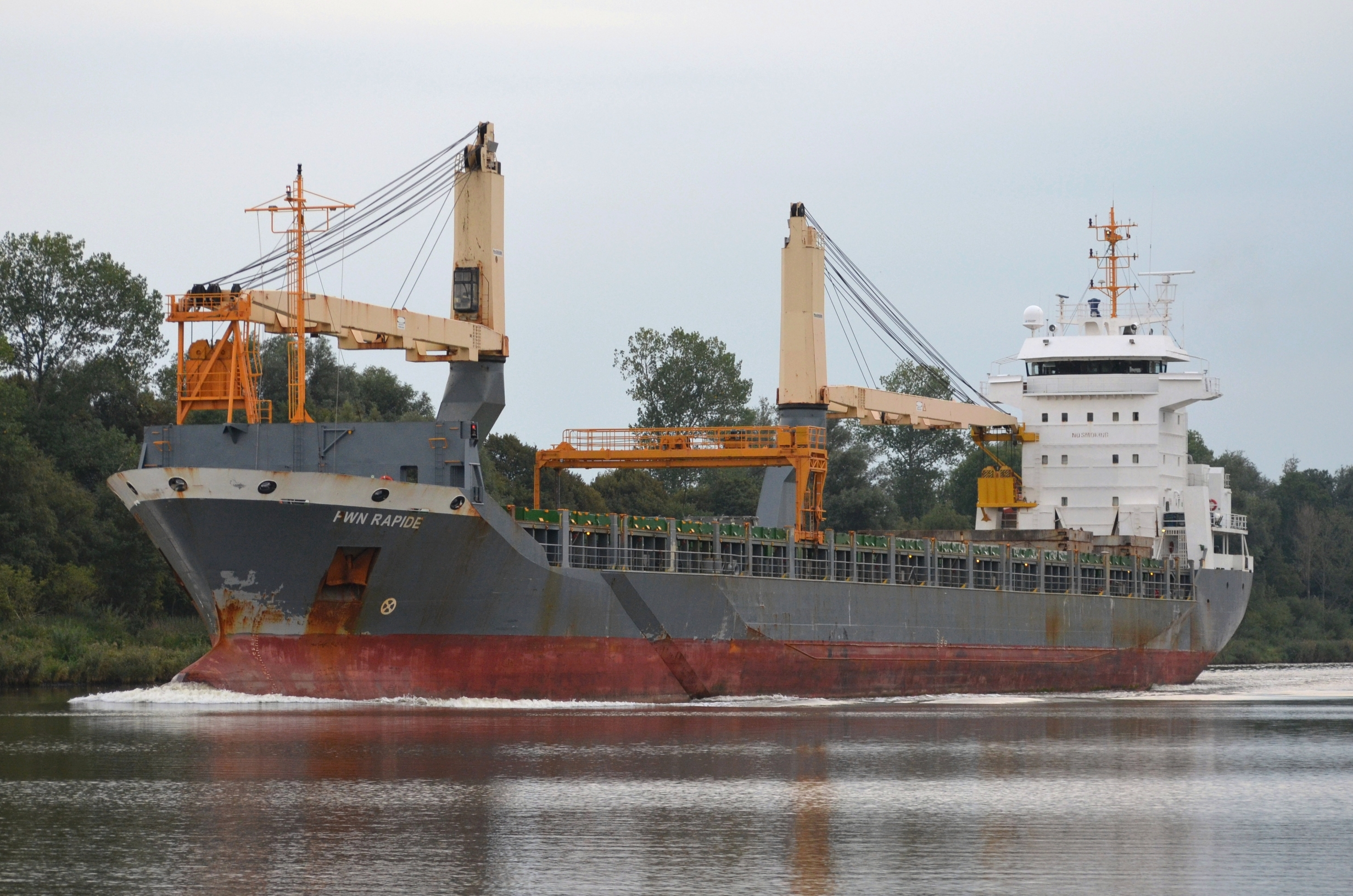
- The MV FWN Rapide, a sister ship of the MV Thorco Cloud transiting the Kiel Canal in 2018.

History
- Name: Thorco Cloud (2013–2015); BBC Brazil (2012–2013); Molene (2010–2012); S. Partner (2008–2010); UAL Gabon (2006–2008); S. Partner (2004–2006)
- Owner: Thorco Projects
- Port of registry: 2012–2015: St. John's, Antigua and Barbuda; 2004–2012: Majuro, Marshall Islands
- Builder: Damen Shipyard, Galați, Romania
- Yard number: 1. 828
- Launched: 1 July 2004
- Identification: IMO number: 9290050; MMSI number: 305800000; Call sign: V2FU6
- Fate: Sunk in a collision with the MV Stolt Commitment in the Strait of Singapore

General characteristics
- Class & type: General cargo ship
- Tonnage: 7,813 GT; 10,385 DWT
- Length: 145.63 m (478 ft)
- Beam: 18.36 m (60 ft)
- Draught: 7.8 m (26 ft)
- Depth: 10.3 m (34 ft)
- Installed power: 1 × MaK 9M32 (1 × 4,300 kW); 3 × Caterpillar 3412 auxiliary engines; 1 × shaft generator
- Propulsion: Diesel; single shaft; 1 × controllable pitch propeller; 1 × bow thruster
- Speed: 14.5 knots (26.9 km/h; 16.7 mph) (service)
- Capacity: 686 TEU
- Crew: 12 crew

MV Thorco Cloud was a general cargo ship owned by Thorco Projects that sank in the Singapore Strait in December 2015 after a collision with the chemical tanker MV Stolt Commitment. The collision resulted in six casualties from a total crew of 12. The collision caused the ship to split into two parts, which sank approximately 1.85 kilometres (1.15 mi) apart at a depth of 70 metres (230 ft) in the traffic separation scheme of the Singapore Strait, one of the world's busiest shipping lanes. The wreck was removed in 2019.

== Construction ==
The ship was constructed by Damen shipyards in Galați, Romania where it was started, and Foxhol, The Netherlands where it was completed. The ship was launched in July 2004, as the MV S. Partner and was one of a series of identical sister ships.

== History ==
The ship has undergone name and Flag State changes throughout its service life, including:

- MV S. Partner flagged in the Marshall Islands.
- MV UAL Gabon flagged in the Marshall Islands.
- MV Molene flagged in Antigua and Barbuda.
- MV BBC Brazil flagged in Antigua and Barbuda.
- MV Thorco Cloud flagged in Antigua and Barbuda.

=== Collision and sinking ===
Locations in the Singapore Strait where the two halves of the Thorco Cloud sank in 2015

On 16 December 2015 the ship departed the port of Batu Ampar, Indonesia with a crew of 12 bound for Durban, South Africa and loaded with a cargo of railway rails. During Thorco Cloud's transit into the Singapore Strait traffic separation scheme, chemical tanker MV Stolt Commitment collided with Thorco Cloud, breaking the ship into two parts and causing them both to sink within the strait. The bow section of the Thorco Cloud continued to float after the collision and drifted, while the aft section containing the bridge and engine room sank almost immediately. Six crew members were rescued from the incident, and six more crew members were declared missing, later found deceased.

The Standard P&I Club instructed Guangzhou Salvage to recover the wreck of the Thorco Cloud, which was performed in 2019.
