= MV Skorpios II =

History

Chile
- Name: Skorpios II
- Owner: Cruceros Skorpios
- Operator: Cruceros Skorpios
- Port of registry: 1988: Puerto Montt, Chile
- Launched: 1988
- Christened: 1988
- Maiden voyage: 1988
- Identification: IMO number: 8006397; MMSI number: 725002200; Callsign: CBKP
- Status: Operating

General characteristics
- Type: Cruise ship
- Tonnage: 1,523 GT
- Displacement: 1,210 tonnes
- Length: ~70 m (229 ft 8 in)
- Beam: 10 m (32 ft 10 in)
- Draught: 2.87 m (9 ft 5 in)
- Decks: 4 (4 passenger accessible)
- Ice class: A1
- Installed power: 1497 hp
- Propulsion: Twin screw
- Speed: 12 knots (22 km/h)
- Capacity: 106 passengers
- Crew: 34
- Notes: Autonomy 2000 miles

MV Skorpios II is a Chile-registered cruise ship owned and operated by Cruceros Skorpios. The ship was built in 1988 on Skorpios, Chile shipyards under SOLAS and IMO regulations and under the ABS (American Bureau of Shipping), Class Nr 890.56.66, A1 ice. Its remodeled in equipment cabins, bathrooms and dining 2010. It has certificate of registration number 2567 of the Directorate General of Maritime Territory of Chile and International Load Line Certificate. Its capacity is up to 106 passengers based on double occupancy, has 53 cabins distributed in 4 decks.
