= MV Stolt Commitment =

Chemical tanker involved in a 2015 collision

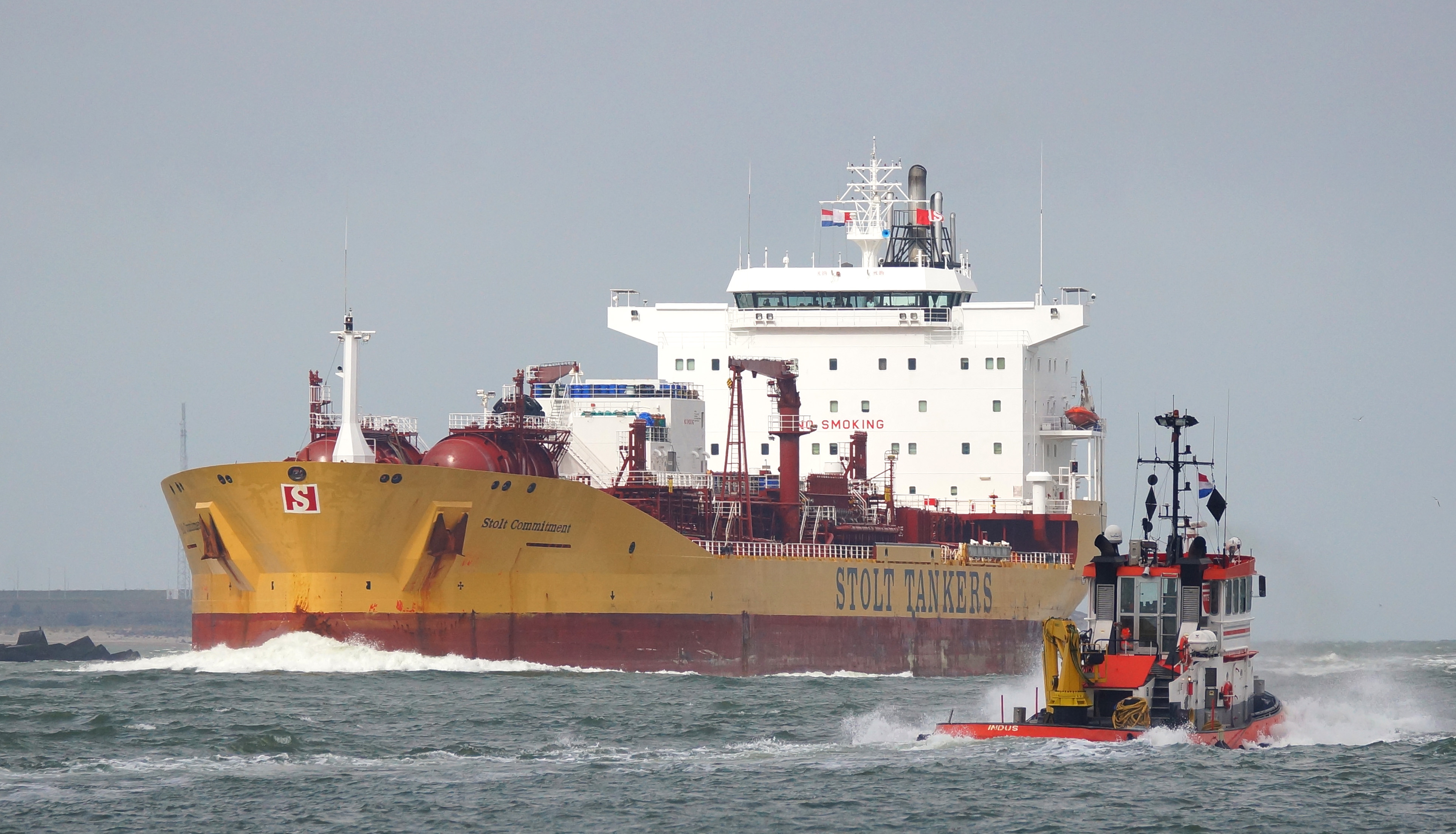
- The MV Stolt Commitment in 2014

History
- Name: Stolt Commitment (2011–present); Bow Century (2000–2011)
- Owner: Stolt Tankers
- Port of registry: 2011–present: George Town, Cayman Islands; 2000–2011: Oslo, Norway
- Builder: Kværner Florø AS, Norway
- Yard number: 1. 139
- Launched: 21 January 2000
- Identification: IMO number: 9168647; MMSI number: 319025300; Call sign: ZGBH8
- Status: In active service

General characteristics
- Class & type: Chemical/product tanker
- Tonnage: 23,206 GT; 3,743 DWT
- Length: 183.1 m (601 ft)
- Beam: 32.2 m (106 ft)
- Draught: 10.718 m (35 ft)
- Depth: 14 m (46 ft)
- Installed power: 1 × MAN SE 6L60MC (1 × 10,416 kW); 2 × MAN B&W 6L28/32H auxiliary engines; 1 × shaft generator
- Propulsion: Diesel; single shaft; 1 × controllable pitch propeller; 2 × bow thruster
- Speed: 15.5 knots (28.7 km/h; 17.8 mph) (service)

MV Stolt Commitment is a chemical tanker owned by Stolt Tankers that collided with, and subsequently sank, the general cargo ship Thorco Cloud in the Singapore Strait in December 2015. The collision resulted in six casualties from a total crew of 12 on the Thorco Cloud, and minor structural damage to the Stolt Commitment.

== Construction ==
The ship was constructed by Kværner Florø AS, Norway. The keel was laid in January 1999 and the ship was launched in January 2000 as the MV Bow Century.

== History ==
The ship has undergone name and flag state changes throughout its service life, including:

- MV Stolt Commitment flagged in the Cayman Islands
- MV Bow Century flagged in Norway.

=== Collision with the Thorco Cloud ===
Location in the Singapore Strait where the two ships collided in 2015

On 16 December 2015 the ship was transiting the Singapore Strait en route to Kaohsiung from Rotterdam. During Thorco Cloud's transit into the Singapore Strait traffic separation scheme after departing the Indonesian port of Batu Ampar, the two ships collided, causing the Thorco Cloud to be split into two parts and causing them both to sink within the strait. The Stolt Commitment only suffered minor structural damage.
