= INS Shikra =

Indian naval air station

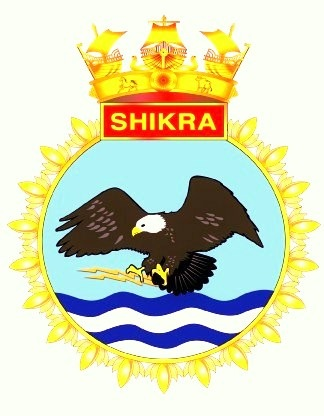

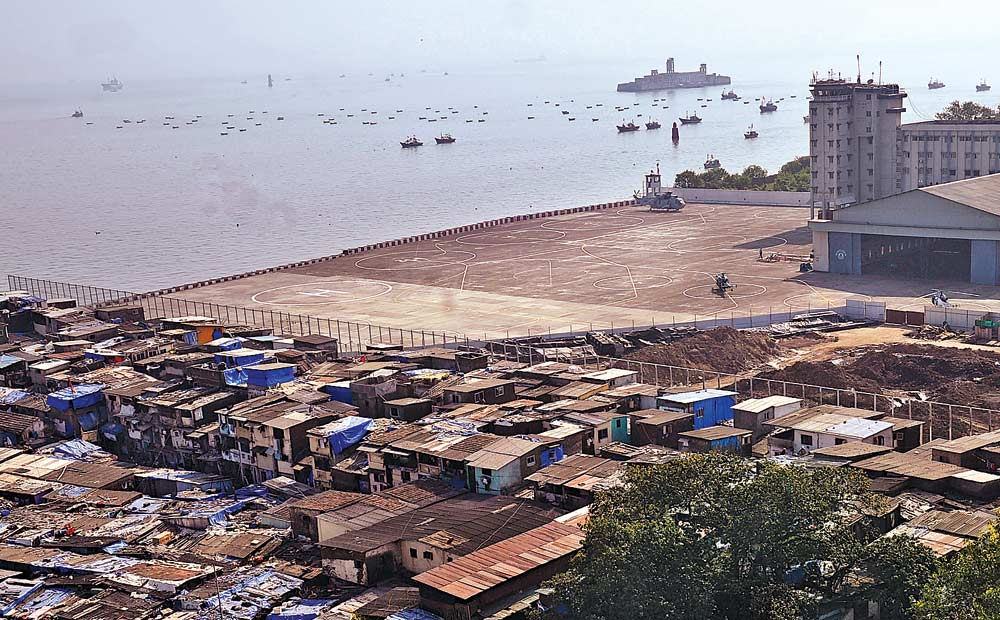
- IATA: none; ICAO: none

Summary
- Airport type: Naval Air Station
- Owner: Western Naval Command
- Operator: Indian Navy
- Location: Mumbai, India
- Built: 1964
- In use: 1964-present
- Coordinates: 18°54′49.63″N 72°49′45.65″E
- Interactive map of INS Shikra

Helipads
Number	Length		Surface
Number	ft	m	Surface
H1	300	91	Asphalt

INS Shikra, formerly known as INS Kunjali, is an Indian naval air station located at Colaba in Mumbai, Maharashtra. It is a heliport.

== History ==
INS Kunjali was commissioned as a new establishment in Mumbai, post-Independence. The locale chosen for the establishment was the old Gun Carriage Basin on the sea front in Colaba, in the heart of South Mumbai. The area was used during the Second World War as a depot for munitions of war and as a boat repair facility. With the acquisition of Alouette III helicopters (now HAL Chetak) in 1963, the establishment was considered suitable for a helipad. The first time a helicopter operated from the base was on a temporary grass helipad in 1964. Alouette flights thereafter continued to operate from the helipad, on a makeshift and as required basis.

Finally, on 3 April 1972 ‘Bombay flight’ of the Goa-based INAS 321 was established with one Alouette III helicopter, two pilots and 17 sailors. On 1 August 1980, one more Chetak was added to the flight and the role of the squadron was enhanced to include VIP flight commitment, Fleet Requirement task including tracking for weapon alignment, casualty evacuation and SAR duties. With the introduction of helicopters on board ships, the base housed and operated these helicopters, when disembarked and a helicopter maintenance facility was set up in 1983.

The Naval Air Station was renamed to INS Shikra in an impressive commissioning ceremony presided over by the Chief of the Naval Staff, Admiral Sureesh Mehta, PVSM, AVSM, ADC on 22 January 2009. The commissioning commanding officer was Captain Philipose George Pynumootil.

== Objective ==
INS Shikra has grown from a small helipad to a full-fledged Heliport providing support and maintenance facilities to the integral flights of the fleet and aviation requirements of the Western Naval Command. The facilities continue to expand to cater for increasing numbers of helicopters being inducted on board ships. Its primary role is to provide administrative, technical and logistic support for all squadrons and flights based in Mumbai. In addition, it undertakes coastal patrol, air surveillance in the area and meets the operational flying requirements of the Western Naval Command.

It also has a major helicopter maintenance depot providing accommodation and maintenance facilities for Westland Sea Kings, Kamov Ka 27s and HAL Chetaks, adding up to 17 helicopters and meeting a task of over 4000 flying hours annually.

== Units ==
Naval Air Squadrons based at INS Shikra include:

- INAS 321, a search and rescue and logistics squadron, operating HAL Chetak helicopters
- INAS 330, an anti-submarine warfare squadron, operating Westland Sea King Mk.42B helicopters

== See also ==
Indian navy

- List of Indian Navy bases
- List of active Indian Navy ships

Integrated commands and units

- Armed Forces Special Operations Division
- Defence Cyber Agency
- Integrated Defence Staff
- Integrated Space Cell
- Indian Nuclear Command Authority
- Indian Armed Forces
- Special Forces of India

Other lists

- Strategic Forces Command
- List of Indian Air Force stations
- List of Indian Navy bases
- India's overseas military bases
